= 1660s =

Decade

The 1660s decade ran from 1 January 1660, to 31 December 1669.

== Events ==
=== 1660 ===
==== January–March ====
- January 1
  - At daybreak, English Army Colonel George Monck, with two brigades of troops from his Scottish occupational force, fords the River Tweed at Coldstream in Scotland to cross the Anglo-Scottish border at Northumberland, with a mission of advancing toward London to end military rule of England by General John Lambert and to accomplish the English Restoration, the return of the monarchy to England. By the end of the day, he and his soldiers have gone 15 mi (24 km) through knee-deep snow to Wooler while the advance guard of cavalry had covered 50 mi (80 km) to reach Morpeth.
  - At the same time, rebels within the New Model Army under the command of Colonel Thomas Fairfax take control of York and await the arrival of Monck's troops.
  - Samuel Pepys, a 36-year-old member of the Parliament of England, begins keeping a diary that later provides a detailed insight into daily life and events in 17th century England. He continues until May 31, 1669, when worsening eyesight leads him to quit. . Pepys starts with a preliminary note, "Blessed be God, at the end of the last year I was in very good health, without any sense of my old pain but upon taking of cold. I lived in Axe-yard, having my wife and servant Jane, and no more in family than us three." For his first note on "January 1. 1659/60 Lords-day", he notes "This morning (we lying lately in the garret) I rose, put on my suit with great skirts, having not lately worn any other clothes but them," followed by recounting his attendance at the Exeter-house church in London.
- January 6 – The Rump Parliament passes a resolution requesting Colonel Monck to come to London "as speedily as he could", followed by a resolution of approval on January 12 and a vote of thanks and annual payment of 1,000 pounds sterling for his lifetime on January 16.
- January 11 – Colonel Monck and Colonel Fairfax rendezvous at York and then prepare to proceed southward toward London. gathering deserters from Lambert's army along the way.
- January 16 – With 4,000 infantry and 1,800 cavalry ("an army sufficient to overawe, without exciting suspicion"), Colonel Monck marches southward toward Nottingham, with a final destination of London. Colonel Thomas Morgan is dispatched back to Scotland with two regiments of cavalry to reinforce troops there.
- January 31 – The Rump Parliament confirms the promotion of Colonel George Monck to the rank of General and he receives the commission of rank while at St Albans.
- February 3 – General George Monck, at the head of his troops, enters London on horseback, accompanied by his principal officers and the commissioners of the Rump Parliament. Bells ring as they pass but the crowds in the streets are unenthusiastic and the troops are "astonished at meeting with so different a reception to that which they had received elsewhere during their march.".
- February 13 – Charles XI becomes king of Sweden at the age of five, upon the death of his father, Charles X Gustavus.
- February 26 – The Rump Parliament, under pressure from General Monck, votes to call back all of the surviving members of the group of 231 MPs who had been removed from the House of Commons in 1648 so that the Long Parliament can be reassembled long enough for a full Parliament to approve elections for a new legislative body.
- February 27 – John Thurloe is reinstated as England's Secretary of State, having been deprived of his offices late in the previous year.
- March 3 – General John Lambert, who had attempted to stop the Restoration, is arrested and imprisoned in the Tower of London. He escapes on April 9 but is recaptured on April 24. Though spared the death penalty for treason in 1662, he remains incarcerated on the island of Guernsey for the rest of his life until his death at age 64 on March 1, 1684.
- March 16 – The Long Parliament, after having been reassembled for the first time in more than 11 years, votes for its own dissolution and calls for new elections for what will become the Convention Parliament to make the return from republic to monarchy.
- March 31 – The war in the West Indies between the indigenous Carib people, and the French Jesuits and English people who have colonized the islands, is ended with a treaty signed at Basse-Terre at Guadeloupe at the residence of the French Governor, Charles Houël du Petit Pré.

==== April–June ====
- April 2 – The Merces baronets, a British nobility title is created.
- April 4 – The Declaration of Breda, signed by Charles Stuart, son of the late King Charles I of England, promises amnesty, freedom of conscience, and army back pay, in return for support for the English Restoration. The Declaration is read to the new parliament on May 1.
- April 25 – The Convention Parliament, a new House of Commons for England, freely elected with no requirement for candidates to swear loyalty to the Commonwealth of England, assembles in London to work out the restoration of the monarchy.
- May 1 – The Convention Parliament votes to welcome the Declaration of Breda and unanimously approves a resolution for England declaring that "according to the ancient and fundamental laws of this kingdom, the Government is, and ought to be, by Kings, Lords and Commons."
- May 3 – In the Treaty of Oliva, peace is made between the Swedish Empire, the Polish–Lithuanian Commonwealth, the Habsburgs and Brandenburg-Prussia.
- May 8 – In exile in the Netherlands, Prince Charles Stuart receives word that the Parliament of England has declared his elevation to the throne as King Charles II of England.
- May 14 – The Irish Parliament declares Charles to be King of Ireland.
- May 15 – John Thurloe is arrested for high treason, for his support of Oliver Cromwell's regime.
- May 21 – The Desormeaux caravan and 300 Iroquois die in explosion at Long Sault.
- May 23 – With the way cleared for his return to England, King Charles II ends his exile at the Hague in the Netherlands and departs from Scheveningen harbor on the English ship Naseby, renamed for the occasion HMS Royal Charles , as part of a fleet of English warships brought by Admiral Edward Montagu. On commemorative memorabilia in the Netherlands, the date of Charles's departure is listed as June 2, 1660, the date on the Gregorian calendar used in continental Europe but not in England.
- May 25 – King Charles II lands at Dover.
- May 27
  - The Treaty of Copenhagen is signed, marking the conclusion of the Second Northern War. Sweden returns Trøndelag to Norway, and Bornholm to Denmark.
  - William Morice takes office as the first Secretary of State for the Northern Department in Great Britain, with responsibility for conducting foreign relations with the Netherlands, Scandinavia, Poland, Russia, and the Holy Roman Empire. Relations with France, Spain, Portugal, Switzerland, the Italian states, and the Ottoman Empire are assigned to the Secretary of State for the Southern Department. The position will eventually evolve into the office of the Foreign Secretary.
- May 29 – King Charles II of England arrives in London and assumes the throne, marking the beginning of the English Restoration.
- June 1
  - The office of Secretary of State for the Southern Department begins operations in the Kingdom of Great Britain, with responsibility for the colonies of British America in what will later become Canada and the United States, as well as for Ireland and for the Channel Islands. Sir Edward Nicholas, a former British Secretary of State, takes office as the first Southern Department secretary.
  - Mary Dyer is hanged for defying a law banning Quakers from the Massachusetts Bay Colony.
- June 29 – John Thurloe is released from custody.

==== July–September ====
- July 13 – (Ashadh Vadya 1 of Shaka 1582) The Battle of Pavan Khind takes place in India when a 600-member contingent of the Maratha Empire army, commanded by Baji Prabhu Deshpande, works to rescue Maratha General Shivaji, who had escaped the night before from the fort of Panhala, which was under siege by the Adilshah Sultanate. The Bijapur Sultanate, commanded by Siddi Masud with a force of 10,000 men, loses 5,000 in a fight against a vastly outnumbered contingent of Adilshah.
- July 24 – The Great Fire of 1660 begins in Constantinople, capital of the Ottoman Empire (now Istanbul in Turkey, and destroys two-thirds of the city over two consecutive days, consuming 280,000 buildings and killing 40,000 people.
- July – Richard Cromwell, the last Lord Protector of England during its years as a republic, leaves the British Isles quietly and goes into exile in France, taking on an alias as "John Clarke".
- August 19 – Dr Edward Stanley preaches a sermon in the nave of Winchester Cathedral, to commemorate the return of the Chapter, following the English Restoration.
- August 29 – The Indemnity and Oblivion Act, officially "An Act of Free and General Pardon, Indemnity, and Oblivion" is given royal assent. as a general pardon for everyone who had committed crimes during the English Civil War and Interregnum (with the exception of certain crimes such as murder, piracy, buggery, rape and witchcraft, and people named in the act such as those involved in the regicide of Charles I). It also said that no action was to be taken against those involved at any later time, and that the Interregnum was to be legally forgotten.
- September 1 – Grigore I Ghica becomes the new Prince of Wallachia (now in Romania)
- September 14 – The 13-day long Battle of Lyubar begins at Liubar (now in Ukraine) during the Russo-Polish War between soldiers of the Polish–Lithuanian Commonwealth against Russia and ends with a victory by Poland.
- September 16 – Juan Francisco Leiva y de la Cerda arrives in Mexico City as the new Viceroy of New Spain.
- September 25 – Samuel Pepys has his first cup of tea (an event recorded in his diary).

==== October–December ====
- October 13 – The Rigsraad (High Council) of Denmark is abolished and Denmark-Norway becomes an absolute monarchy as King Frederik III is recognized by the nobility as being entitled to have his throne passed to his descendants by hereditary monarchy.
- October 13 to October 19 – Ten of the 57 "regicides" who signed the death warrant of Charles I of England in 1649 are executed over a period of one week, mostly at Charing Cross by being hanged, drawn and quartered, a process which includes being disemboweled (in some cases before they have died) and then and burned. The first to die is Thomas Harrison, a leader of the Fifth Monarchists. He is followed by John Carew (October 15); John Cook and Hugh Peter (October 16); (Adrian Scrope, John Moore, Gregory Clement and Thomas Scot) (October 17); and Daniel Axtell and Francis Hacker (October 19).
- November 28 – At Gresham College in London, twelve men, including Christopher Wren, Robert Boyle, John Wilkins, and Sir Robert Moray meet after a lecture by Wren, and decide to found "a College for the Promoting of Physico-Mathematicall Experimentall Learning" (later known as the Royal Society).
- December 8 – The first English actress appears on the professional stage in England in a non-singing role, as Desdemona in Othello at Vere Street Theatre in London, following the reopening of the theatres (various opinions have been advanced that the actress was Margaret Hughes, Anne Marshall or Katherine Corey). Historian Elizabeth Howe notes, however, that both William Davenant and Thomas Killigrew had women in their acting companies before 1660, and that Anne Marshall might be just one of the first rather than the actual first.
- December 15 – Andres Malong, a native chieftain of the town of Binalatongan (now San Carlos) in the Philippines, leads a successful revolt against the Spanish colonial administrators to liberate Pangasinan. He is proclaimed the King of Pangasinan, but the rebellion is suppressed on January 17, 1661, and Pangasinan is reconquered by February.
- December 18 – The Company of the Royal Adventurers into Africa, planned by Prince James, brother of King Charles II to capture persons along the coast of West Africa for resale as slaves, receives its charter. Prince James, later King James II, had started asking for investors (at 250 pounds sterling per share) starting on October 3, 1660.
- December 29 – The Convention Parliament is dissolved by King Charles II and elections are called for what will be called the Cavalier Parliament.

==== Date unknown ====
- Blaise Pascal's Lettres provinciales, a defense of the Jansenist Antoine Arnauld, is ordered to be shredded and burned by King Louis XIV of France.
- The Expulsion of the Carib indigenous people from Martinique is carried out by French occupying forces.
- Hopkins School is founded in New Haven, Connecticut.
- A permanent standing army is established in Prussia.

=== 1661 ===
==== January–March ====
- January 6 – The Fifth Monarchists, led by Thomas Venner, unsuccessfully attempt to seize control of London; George Monck's regiment defeats them.
- January 29 – The Rokeby baronets, a British nobility title is created.
- January 30 – The body of Oliver Cromwell is exhumed and subjected to a posthumous execution in London, along with those of John Bradshaw and Henry Ireton.
- February 5 – The Shunzhi Emperor of the Chinese Qing Dynasty dies, and is succeeded by his 7-year-old son the Kangxi Emperor.
- February 7 – Shah Shuja, who was deprived of his claim to the throne of the Mughal Empire by his younger brother Aurangzeb, then fled to Burma, is killed by Indian troops in an attack on his residence at Arakan.
- February 14 – George Monck’s regiment becomes The Lord General's Regiment of Foot Guards in England (which later becomes the Coldstream Guards).
- March 9 – Following the death of his mentor, Cardinal Jules Mazarin, who had been Minister of State since before the birth of King Louis XIV of France, King Louis, now 22, starts to rule independently without need for a regent.
- March 23 – General Zheng Chenggong of China, known as "Koxinga" leads an invasion of the island of Taiwan, at the time under the control of the Dutch East India Company (VOC), bringing 25,000 soldiers and sailors on hundreds of boats to claim the territory.

==== April–June ====
- April 7 – The siege of Fort Zeelandia, the Dutch East India Company (VOC) headquarters on the Chinese island of Taiwan (near modern Taoyuan City) is started by Koxinga and his invading force from China.
- April 23 (May 3 N.S.) – King Charles II of England, Scotland, and Ireland is crowned in Westminster Abbey.
- May 8 – The "Cavalier Parliament", the longest serving Parliament in British history, is opened following the first parliamentary elections since the restoration of the monarchy in 1660. The first session of the House of Commons and the House of Lords lasts until June 30 and then reopens on November 20. The Cavalier Parliament continues meeting, without new elections, until being dissolved on January 24, 1679.
- May 11 – The Indian city and territory of Bombay is ceded by Portugal to England in accordance with the dowry of King Joao IV of Portugal for the marriage of his daughter Catherine to King Charles II of England.
- May 17 – Leaders of the indigenous Taiwanese villages in the plains and mountains of the Dutch-ruled island begin surrendering to the Chinese forces led by Koxinga and agreeing to hunt down and execute Dutch people on the island.
- May 27 – The Marquess of Argyll, one of the first of the Scottish-born people sentenced to death as a regicide for his role in the conviction and execution of King Charles I of England and Scotland in 1649, is beheaded at the Tolbooth Prison in Edinburgh using the "Scottish Maiden," almost immediately after his conviction of collaboration with the government of Oliver Cromwell. His head is then placed on a spike outside the prison.
- June 1 – At Edinburgh, the public execution of Presbyterian minister James Guthrie, followed by Captain William Govan, takes place at the Mercat Cross at Parliament Square, days after both have been convicted of treason for their roles in the execution of King Charles I. The heads are severed from the corpses and displayed on spikes in the square.
- June 3 – Pye Min, younger brother of King Pindale Min of Burma, leads a bloody coup d'etat and ascends the throne. Pindale Min and his family (including his primary wife, a son and a grandson) are drowned in the Chindwin River. Pye Min reigns until 1672.
- June 14 – General Zheng Chenggong of China takes control of most of the island of Taiwan from the Dutch East India Company and proclaims the Kingdom of Tungning, with himself as the ruler.
- June 23 – The "Marriage Treaty" is signed between representatives of King Charles II of England and King João IV of Portugal, providing a military alliance between the two kingdoms and a marriage between Charles of the House of Stuart and João's daughter Catherine of the House of Braganza on May 21, 1662. The treaty also sets the transfer of Portuguese territory in India (at Bombay) and in North Africa (Tangier) to England as well as military aid from England to Portugal.
- June 28 – The innovative Lincoln's Inn Fields Theatre opens in London with the first system for interchangeable scenery on a stage in the British Isles, and a production of William Davenant's opera The Siege of Rhodes.

==== July–September ====
- July 1 – The war between the empires of Russia and Sweden is ended with the signing of the Treaty of Cardis in what is now the Estonian city of Kärde. Russia returns those portions of Livonia and Ingria that it had taken earlier from Sweden.
- August 6 – Portugal and the Dutch Republic sign the Treaty of The Hague, whereby the Dutch Republic's South American colony of Nieuw-Holland is sold to Portugal for the equivalent of roughly 63,000 kilograms (139,000 lb) of gold, and incorporated into Brazil. The territory includes much of what will later become the Brazilian states of Ceará, Maranhão, Paraíba, Pernambuco and Rio Grande do Norte. Among the major Dutch settlements lost are Mauritsstad (Recife), Fort Schoonenborch (Fortaleza), Nieuw-Amsterdam (Natal), and Frederikstadt (João Pessoa).
- September 5 – Nicolas Fouquet, the Superintendent of Finances for France, is arrested in Nantes and charged with embezzlement of the state treasury. Spared the death penalty by a jury, Fouquet spends the rest of his life in prison until his death in 1680.

==== October–December ====
- October 6 – Guru Har Krishan becomes eighth of the ten Sikh gurus, and at age 5 the youngest, following the death of his father Guru Har Rai.
- October 31 – Köprülüzade Fazıl Ahmed Pasha is appointed as the new Grand Vizier of the Ottoman Empire at the request of his late father, the Grand Vizier Köprülü Mehmed Pasha, serving under the Sultan Mehmed IV for 15 years and continuing the Köprülü family dynasty whose members will serve as Viziers until 1711.
- November 4 – Polish and Lithuanian forces, led by King Jan II Kazimierz (who is also the Grand Duke of Lithuania) defeat the Russian Army at the Battle of Kushliki.
- December 14 – Prince Murad Bakhsh, younger brother of the Mughal Emperor Aurangzeb, is executed at Gwailor Fort on order of his brother.
- December 16 – Abraham Cowley's comedy The Cutter of Coleman Street premieres at the Lincoln's Inn Fields Playhouse in London as a production of the Duke's Company.
- December 21 – General Wu Sangui of China arrives in Burma with 20,000 troops and demands that the Burmese surrender Yongli, the last of the Ming dynasty rulers of Southern China before the Qing dynasty consolidated its rule. Burma's King Pye Min hands Yongli over to General Wu on January 15, and Yongli is subsequently executed.
- December 24 – The Indian city of Quilon (now Kollam in the Kerala state), ruled by Portugal since 1498, is captured by the Dutch East India Company.

==== Date unknown ====
- The first modern bank notes are issued in Stockholm, Sweden.
- Great Clearance in China: evacuation of Guangdong is required.

=== 1662 ===
==== January–March ====
- January 4 – Dziaddin Mukarram Shah becomes the new Sultan of Kedah, an independent kingdom on the Malay Peninsula, upon the death of his father, Sultan Muhyiddin Mansur.
- January 10 – At the age of 19, Louis Grimaldi becomes the new Prince of Monaco upon the death of his grandfather, Honoré II.
- January 14 – A Portuguese garrison invades Morocco and kidnaps 35 women and girls, then steals 400 head of cattle. The Moroccans counterattack and kill the garrison's commander, 12 knights and 38 other Portuguese soldiers before the surviving Portuguese are given sanctuary inside the English fortress at Tangier. A brief war ensues between England and Morocco.
- January 22 – Former Chinese Emperor Yongli, who had surrendered to General Wu Sangui in December, is put on a boat along with his sons and grandsons at Sagaing in Burma (at the time, Burma), leaving under the promise that they will be given safe passage elsewhere in Burma. Instead, the former Emperor is taken back to China and executed on June 1.
- January 23 – János Kemény, Prince of Transylvania for slightly more than a year, is killed during Transylvania's defeat by the Ottoman Empire in a battle at Nagyszőllős, now the city of Vynohradiv in Ukraine. An Ottoman appointee, Michael Apafi, replaces Kemény in September and the status of the principality of Transylvania (now part of Romania) is never regained.
- February 1 – Chinese general Koxinga (Zheng Chenggong) captures the Dutch East India Company's settlement at Fort Zeelandia (now Tainan) on the island of Taiwan after a nine-month siege, ending the company's rule on the island, then establishes the Kingdom of Tungning. In response, the Kangxi Emperor of the mainland Qing dynasty relocates all residents along the southern coast, by 50 miles.
- February 11 – A violent storm in the Indian Ocean strikes a fleet of seven ships of the Dutch East India Company (VOC) as they are traveling back to the Dutch Republic from Batavia in the Dutch East Indies (now Jakarta, Indonesia). Three of the freighters— Wapen van Holland, Gekroonde Leeuw and Prins Willem — are lost with all hands. The ships Vogel Phoenix, Maarsseveen and Prinses Royal make their way back to the Netherlands. The other ship, the freighter Arnhem remains afloat and its roughly 80 survivors are able to evacuate in boats to search for land.
- February 20 – The survivors of the wreck of the Dutch freighter Arnhem strike reefs but are able to make their way to an uninhabited island, probably the Ile D'Ambre or Ilot Fourneau both islands within the territory of Mauritius. During more than two months while shipwrecked, the survivors kill and eat the local wildlife, including the last surviving dodo. They are rescued by the English ship Truroe in May.
- March 18 – Carrosses à cinq sols, a short-lived experiment of the first public bus system (horse-drawn wagons holding eight passengers) begins in Paris as the idea of mathematician Blaise Pascal and financed by the Duc de Rouanez, with transportation to and from the Royal Square for the cost of five sous.

==== April–June ====
- April 19 – Three of the former members of the English Parliament who had signed the death warrant for Charles I of England in 1649 and then fled into exile in the Netherlands after the Restoration of the Monarchy in 1660 — Miles Corbet, John Okey and John Barkstead — are hanged after having been extradited, returned to England, and convicted of regicide. Their bodies are then drawn and quartered.
- April 22 – The Golden Hill Paugussett tribe, granted reservations in the British colony of Connecticut in North America, sell a large amount of tribal land to Captain Joseph Hawley including several towns in Fairfield County: Shelton, Trumbull, Derby and Monroe.
- April 24 – Chinese warlord Zheng Chenggong sends a message to the Spanish government of the Philippines demanding payment of tribute and threatening to send a fleet of ships to conquer the area. The message reaches the Spanish Governor-General on May 5, and preparations are made to resist the invasion.
- May 3 – John Winthrop the Younger, the son of the first governor of Massachusetts, is honored by being made a fellow of the Royal Society, England's new scientific society. Winthrop uses his election to the Society to gain access to the king, who grants him a new charter, uniting the colonies of Connecticut and New Haven.
- May 9 – Samuel Pepys witnesses a Punch and Judy show in London (the first on record).
- May 16 – The hearth tax is introduced in England and Wales.
- May 19
  - The Act of Uniformity 1662, officially "An Act for the uniformity of common prayer and service in the Church, and administration of the sacraments", is given royal assent after being passed by the English Parliament to regulate the form of public prayers, sacraments, and other rites of the Church of England to conform with the newest edition of the Book of Common Prayer, the 1662 prayer book.
  - Royal assent is also given to England's new hearth tax law, with one shilling charged for each stove or fireplace in a building, to be collected on 29 September and on 25 March each year in order to provide the £1,200,000 annual household income for King Charles II. The unpopular tax is abolished in 1689.
- May 21 – (May 31 N.S.); Princess Catherine of Braganza, daughter of King João IV of Portugal, marries Charles II of England. As part of the dowry, Portugal cedes Bombay in India, and Tangier in Morocco, to England.
- May 24 – Rioting in the Chinese section of Manila breaks out in the wake of calls to kill non-Christian Chinese residents of the Philippines, and the Spanish Army fires cannons at the rioting crowd. An order follows for non-Christian Chinese Filipinos to leave Manila, and for Christian Filipinos to register with the government. Boats begin transporting the non-Christians back to China
- May – The last credible report of a sighting of the dodo bird, now extinct, is made by Volkert Evertsz, a survivor of the shipwreck of the Dutch ship Arnhem, which struck reefs on February 12. The survivors had made their way in a small boat to Ile d'Ambre, an island in the Indian Ocean 200 kilometres (120 mi) northeast of Mauritius. When rescued by the English ship Truroe in May, Evertsz reports that he and his group had survived by eating the local wildlife, including the dodo.
- June 4 – The "Sangley Massacre" is ordered by Sabiniano Manrique de Lara, the Spanish Governor-General of the Philippines, with the directive for the government to kill all Filipinos of Chinese ancestry — Sangleys — who disobey orders to assemble at Manila for deportation.
- June 15 – The Matthews baronets British nobility title is created.
- June 21 – The Pierce baronets British nobility title is created.
- June 23 – Koxinga, who had founded the Kingdom of Tungning on the island of Taiwan a year earlier, names his successor while on his deathbed. He appoints his son, Zheng Jing, whom he had earlier ordered unsuccessfully to be executed, as the new King.

==== July–September ====
- July 15 – The Royal Society, founded by King Charles II of England and Scotland receives an official charter in London.
- August 20 – Ignatius Andrew Akijan is installed as the new Patriarch of the Syriac Catholic Church for Christians within the Muslim-ruled Ottoman Empire after his appointment is confirmed by the Sultan Mehmed IV.
- August 24 – The Act of Uniformity goes into effect on St Bartholomew's Day, making mandatory in the Church of England the forms of worship prescribed in the new edition of the Book of Common Prayer the deadline having been set for "every clergyman and every schoolmaster... to express, by August 24, his unfeigned consent to everything contained in the Book of Common Prayer. This is followed by the resignation of over 2,000 clergy who resign "for conscience sake". Those who refuse to take the required oath of conformity to the established church are subject to the Great Ejection from their jobs.
- September 9 – The Parliament of Scotland passes the Act of Indemnity and Oblivion, an amnesty (with numerous specific exceptions) for most political crimes committed by Scottish citizens during the years between January 1, 1637 (prior to the 1639 beginning of the Wars of the Three Kingdoms and before the restoration of the monarchy on September 16, 1660.
- September 29 – The first payments under England's hearth tax law, enacted on May 19, become due.

==== October–December ====
- October 27 – Charles II of England sells Dunkirk to France, for £400,000 (2.5 million French livres).
- November 28 – The English Royal Society holds its first meeting.
- December 4 – The Purefoy baronets British nobility title is created.
- December 20 – Nicolas Fouquet is banished from France.
- December 26 – Molière's play, The School for Wives, is given its première in Paris.

==== Date unknown ====
- Robert Boyle publishes Nova experimenta physico-mechanica in Oxford (2nd edition), setting forth the law bearing his name.
- Joan Blaeu publishes Atlas Maior, sive cosmographia Blaviana in Amsterdam (first complete edition, 11 volumes in Latin).
- Milton, Massachusetts is incorporated as a town.
- John Graunt, in one of the earliest uses of statistics, publishes statistical information about births and deaths in London.
- The Akademie der Bildenden Künste Nürnberg is founded in Germany.

=== 1663 ===
==== January–March ====
- January 10 – The Royal African Company is granted a Royal Charter by Charles II of England.
- January 23 – The Treaty of Ghilajharighat is signed in India between representatives of the Mughal Empire and the independent Ahom Kingdom (in what is now the Assam state), with the Mughals ending their occupation of the Ahom capital of Garhgaon, in return for payment by Ahom in silver and gold for costs of the occupation, and King Sutamla of Ahom sending one of his daughters to be part of the harem of Mughal Emperor Aurangzeb.
- February 5 – An earthquake estimated at least 7.3 magnitude strikes Canada's Quebec Province.
- February 8 – English pirates led by Christopher Myngs and Edward Mansvelt carry out the sack of Campeche in Mexico, looting the town during a two week occupation that ends on February 23.
- February 10 – The army of the Kingdom of Siam (now Thailand) captures Chiang Mai from the Kingdom of Burma (now Myanmar), using it as a base for launching a larger attack on the Burmese coast in November.
- March 4 – The Prince Edward Islands in the sub-antarctic Indian Ocean are discovered by Barent Barentszoon Lam, of the Dutch ship Maerseveen, and named Dina (Prince Edward) and Maerseveen (Marion).
- March 5 – Emperor Go-Sai's reign ends, and Emperor Reigen ascends to the throne of Japan.
- March 24 – King Charles II of England issues the Charter of Carolina, establishing the Province of Carolina, and dividing it between eight Lords Proprietors.

==== April–June ====
- April 17 – The Ottoman Empire declares war against Leopold I, Holy Roman Emperor, beginning the Austro-Turkish War.
- May 7 – The King's Theatre, now called "Drury Lane", opens in London.
- June 7 – Under the pretext of working out a treaty with Dutch settlers in the colony of New Netherland, the Esopus tribe of the Delaware people enter the fortress at Wiltwijck (now the U.S. city of Kingston, New York) and stage a surprise attack. Unbeknownst to the Wiltwijck residents, another group of Esopus warriors had destroyed the village of Nieu Dorp (now Hurley, New York) earlier in the day. The episode begins the Second Esopus War.
- June 8 – The Portuguese and some English auxiliaries defeat the Spanish Army in the Battle of Ameixial.

==== July–September ====
- July 8 – King Charles II of England grants John Clarke a Royal Charter for the American colony of Rhode Island and Providence Plantations.
- July 19 – Acting as intermediaries between the Dutch and Esopus war parties, a group of three Mohawk Indians obtain the release of the first four hostages who had been taken hostage in the Esopus attack on Wildwyck, two women and two children.
- July 27 – The English Parliament passes the second Navigation Act, requiring that all goods bound for the American colonies have to be sent in English ships from English ports.
- August 15 – Oratam, leader of the Hackensack tribe of the Lenape nation, meets in New Amsterdam (now New York City) with Weswatewchy, Memshe and Wemessamy, three chiefs of the Monsiyok tribe, to ask for the Hackensacks to supply a cannon to defend their fort, and to confirm that the Monsiyok are not allied with the other major division of the Lenape, the Esopus tribe.
- August 21 – Concerned about the wintry weather, the Parliament of England holds an intercessory fast.
- August 28 – In an unseasonably cold summer, severe frost hits England.

1663 flag of Sweden

- September 5 – Dutch Captain Martin Kregier and Lieutenant Couwenhoven lead an attack against the Esopus Indians from the right and Lieutenant Stilwil and Ensign Niessen the left wing. In the battle, near what is now Mamakating, New York, Chief Papequanaehen and 14 other Esopus warriors are killed, along with seven civilians; three Dutch soldiers are killed, but 23 Dutch prisoners are rescued.
- September 8 – Diego de Salcedo becomes the new Spanish Governor-General of the Philippines, replacing Sabiniano Manrique de Lara, who had served for more than 10 years. Salcedo is overthrown in 1668.
- September 13
  - The Gloucester County Conspiracy, the first slave rebellion in British North America, is foiled after one of the plotters, John Birkenhead, reveals the plan of African slaves and English indentured servants to kill their masters. Birkenhead is freed by his master as a reward for betraying the rebels.
  - After a siege of more than a month, the Hungarian fortress at Érsekújvár (now Nové Zámky in Slovakia) surrenders to the Ottoman Empire. In accordance with the treaty of surrender negotiated by the Hungarian commander, Count Ádám Forgách, the European residents are allowed free passage to Austria, and the Ottoman Grand Vizier, Fazil Ahmed Pasha provides a document certifying that the fort's defenders fought bravely.

==== October–December ====
- October 12 – The Farnley Wood Plot, a conspiracy in the English county of West Yorkshire to overthrow the recently-restored monarchy and to return to the military rule that had been established by the late Oliver Cromwell, fails when only 26 men gather at Farnley. The group is arrested and 21 of the rebels are later executed for treason.
- October 16 – With 2,000 men under his command, Petar Zrinski, the Viceroy of Croatia within the Holy Roman Empire, defeats a much larger force of 8,000 Ottoman soldiers in the Battle at Jurjeve Stijene, near the modern town of Otočac. The Croatians lose 10 soldiers killed; the Ottoman invasion force suffers over 1,500 deaths.
- November 6 – The Kingdom of Sweden adopts a law creating the flag in use in the nation now, a yellow Nordic cross on a blue background. The original version, used as a state flag and on ships, had three pennants.
- November 19 – Alexandre de Prouville de Tracy is appointed by King Louis XIV of Frances as the new Governor General of the French West Indies as the colonies of Saint-Domingue, Saint Martin, Guadeloupe, Dominica, Saint Barthélemy, and Saint Croix are put under a unified rule for the colonies in the Caribbean Sea for the first time since 1651.
- November 24 – The General Court of Commissioners for Rhode Island and Providence Plantations convenes for the final time, meeting in Newport to formally receive the Rhode Island Royal Charter issued on July 8 by King Charles II.
- December 12 – The Dutch Republic prohibits practice of the common law custom of jus naufragii, the doctrine that permitted people to seize property that had washed ashore on their land after a shipwreck.
- December 17 – Queen Ana Nzinga of the Kingdom of Ndongo and the Kingdom of Matamba, both located in the northern part of what is now the Republic of Angola in Africa, dies after a 39-year reign in Ndongo and 32 years after conquering Matamba. She is succeeded by her sister, Barbara Mukambu Mbandi, who rules for less than three years.
- December 27 – Jacob Hustaert becomes the new Governor of Dutch Ceylon.

==== Date unknown ====
- The Prix de Rome scholarship is established in France for students of the arts.
- The first Maroon community arises in Suriname.
- Robert Hooke discovers that cork is made of "tiny little rooms", which he first calls "Cells".
- Publication at Cambridge in the Massachusetts Bay Colony of the "Eliot Indian Bible" (Mamusse Wunneetupanatamwe Up-Biblum God), which becomes the first complete Bible published in the Americas, a translation by English-born Puritan missionary John Eliot of the Geneva Bible, from English into the Massachusett language (Natic or Wômpanâak) variety of the Algonquian languages.

=== 1664 ===
==== January–March ====
- January 5 – Battle of Surat in India: The Maratha leader, Chhatrapati Shivaji, defeats the Mughal Army Captain Inayat Khan, and sacks Surat.
- January 7 – Indian entrepreneur Virji Vora, described in the 17th century by the English East India Company as the richest merchant in the world, suffers the loss of a large portion of his wealth when the Maratha troops of Shivaji plunder his residence at Surat and his business warehouses.
- February 2 – Jesuit missionary Johann Grueber arrives in Rome after a 214-day journey that had started in Beijing, proving that commerce can be had between Europe and Asia by land rather than ship.
- February 12 – The Treaty of Pisa is signed between France and the Papal States to bring an end to the Corsican Guard Affair that began on August 20, 1662, when the French ambassador was shot and killed by soldiers in the employ of Pope Alexander VII.
- February 14 – A peace treaty is signed in Turin in Italy to end the War of the Banished between the Duchy of Savoy and the Waldensians.
- February 26 – Alexandre de Prouville de Tracy, appointed by King Louis XIV of France as Lieutenant Général of the Americas, departs from the port of La Rochelle with 1,200 men and seven ships to expand France's property in the Caribbean Sea and in South America.
- March 12 – King Charles II of England makes royal charter for territory in North America that leases to his brother, James, Duke of York, a patent for a large amount of land in what is now the northeastern United States. According to the Charter, James receives "all that part of the mayne land of New England" between "New Scotland in America" and the river of Kenebeque", along with "Mattowacks or Long Island" and "Martins Vineyard and Nantukes", and the lands between the "Connecticutte and Hudsons rivers" and the lands "from the west side of "Connecticutte to the east side De la Warre Bay". The lease, which includes the territory claimed by the Dutch Republic as New Netherland is for most of the U.S. state of Maine and parts of Connecticut, New York, New Jersey and Pennsylvania.
- March 19 – Polish astronomer Jan Heweliusz becomes the first native of Poland to be inducted into England's Royal Society.

==== April–June ====
- April 14 – All grants to the Compagnie des Isles de l'Amerique for development of French-claimed islands in the Caribbean Sea are revoked by King Louis XIV, including the rights to the islands of Martinique and Saint Lucia that had been sold to Marie Bonnard du Parquet prior to her death in 1659.
- April 28 – Juan Alonso de Cuevas y Dávalos is appointed as the new Roman Catholic Archbishop of Mexico by Pope Alexander VII, to allow Archbishop Mateo de Sagade de Bugueyro to return to Spain. Archbishop Cuevas is installed on November 15 upon his arrival in Mexico City.
- May 9 – Robert Hooke discovers Jupiter's Great Red Spot.
- May 12 – The original version of Tartuffe, a comedy by French playwright and actor Molière, is given its first performance, staged at the Palace of Versailles
- May 15 – Guerin Spranger, commander of the Dutch fortress at Cayenne in South America, surrenders without a fight to French commander Alexandre de Prouville de Tracy and 1,200 employees of the Compagnie de la France équinoxiale, giving France control of the territory that becomes the colony of French Guiana.
- May 28 – King Louis XIV of France establishes the Compagnie des Indes Occidentales by royal decree to replace the recently cancelled Compagnie des Isles de l'Amerique.
- June 3 – In the city of Mantua in Italy, the world's oldest continuously published private newspaper, Gazzetta di Mantova, publishes its first-known issue. The newspaper would celebrate its 350th anniversary in 2014.
- June 5 – The siege of the Croatian fortress at Novi Zrin (located near the village of Donja Dubrava in Croatia near its border with Hungary). After a 32-day defense, the Croatian defenders surrender to troops of the Ottoman Empire.
- June 9 – Kronenbourg Brewery (Brasseries Kronenbourg) is founded in Strasbourg.
- June 24 – The Second Anglo-Dutch War carries over to North America as soldiers of the English Army invade the Dutch colony of New Netherland, promised by King Charles II of England to his brother, the Duke of York. By October, the Dutch Republic surrenders the colony to the English and New Netherland (and its largest city, New Amsterdam) are renamed in honor of York.

==== July–September ====
- August 1 – Battle of Saint Gotthard: The Ottoman Empire is defeated by a Habsburg army, led by Raimondo Montecuccoli, leading to the Peace of Vasvár.
- August 11 – Sir John Lisle, a former member of the English House of Commons who had been designated a regicide for his role in signing the death warrant in the execution in 1649 of Charles I of England, is assassinated in a church courtyard in Lausanne in Switzerland. Lisle had gone into exile after the restoration of the monarchy in 1660. The shooting of Lisle, done on order of King Charles II, is carried out by a team led by royal agent James Cotter.
- August 27 – The French East India Company (Compagnie des Indes Orientales) is founded.
- September 8 (August 29 O.S.) – Peter Stuyvesant, Director-General of the Dutch Republic colony of New Netherland, surrenders New Amsterdam to an English naval squadron, commanded by Colonel Richard Nicolls, without bloodshed. The English promptly rename the fledgling city New York, after the Duke of York (later King James II).
- September 23 – The French Navy ship Tigre sinks off of the coast of the island of Sardinia, with the loss of 64 men. Another 58 of the crew are rescued.

==== October–December ====
- October 4 – New Netherland is captured by England.
- October 28 – The "Duke of York and Albany's maritime regiment of foot" is formed in London and serves as a precursor to the Royal Marines of the United Kingdom.
- October 31 – Surrounded by a Berber army, the French Navy evacuates the presidio of Jijel, a Mediterranean Sea port in what is now the Republic of Algeria, after having captured it from the Algiers Regency on June 12.
- November 6 – The oldest hospital in India, the Government General Hospital, is opened at Madras by the English East India Company for the treatment of ill soldiers.
- November 17 – Lithuanian colonist Jacob Kettler, Duke of Courland, gives up all of his rights to his African colony at St Andrew's Island in the Gambia River to representatives of King Charles II, in return for keeping possession of the Caribbean island of Tobago.
- December 3 – The English warships HMS Nonsuch and HMS Phoenix are wrecked in a storm at Gibraltar.
- December 20 – All but 3 members of the over 200-person crew of the Dutch ship Kennemerland are killed when the trade ship sinks in a storm near the Out Skerries islands off of the coast of Scotland.

==== Date unknown ====
- Austere reforms introduced in the Cistercian La Trappe Abbey in Normandy by Armand de Rancé, origin of the Trappists.
- John Evelyn's Sylva, or A Discourse of Forest-Trees and the Propagation of Timber is published in London, in book form.

=== 1665 ===
==== January–March ====
- January 5 – The Journal des sçavans begins publication of the first scientific journal in France.
- February 15 – Molière's comedy Dom Juan ou le Festin de pierre, based on the Spanish legend of the womanizer Don Juan Tenorio and Tirso de Molina's Spanish play El burlador de Sevilla y convidado de piedra, premieres in Paris at the Théâtre du Palais-Royal.
- February 21 – In India, Shivaji Bhonsale of the Maratha Empire captures the English East India Company's trading post at Sadashivgad (now located in the Indian state of Karnataka).
- February – In England, Dr. Richard Lower performs the first blood transfusion between animals. According to his account to the Royal Society journal Philosophical Transactions in December, Dr. Lower "towards the end of February... selected one dog of medium size, opened its jugular vein, and drew off blood, until its strength was nearly gone. Then, to make up for the great loss of this dog by the blood of a second, I introduced blood from the cervical artery of a fairly large mastiff, which had been fastened alongside the first, until this latter animal showed it was overfilled by the inflowing blood."
- March 4 – The Second Anglo-Dutch War begins.
- March 6 – The Philosophical Transactions of the Royal Society of London begins publication in England, the first scientific journal in English and the oldest to be continuously published.
- March 11 – A new legal code is approved for the Dutch and English towns of New York, guaranteeing all Protestants the right to continue their religious observances unhindered.
- March 16 – Bucharest allows Jews to settle in the city, in exchange for an annual tax of 16 guilders.

==== April–June ====
- April 12 – The burial of Margaret Porteous is recorded; hers is the first known death during the Great Plague of London. This last major outbreak of Bubonic plague in the British Isles has possibly been introduced by Dutch prisoners of war. Two-thirds of Londoners leave the city, but over 68,000 die. The plague spreads to Derbyshire.
- May 19 – Great fire of Newport, Shropshire, England.
- June 11 – Shivaji, leader of the Bhonsale clan of the Marathas in India, signs the Treaty of Purandar with the Mughal Empire, giving up 23 of the 35 forts under his control, agreeing to pay reparations to the Mughal Emperor Aurangzeb, and sending his son to stay as a hostage at Agra.
- June 12 – England installs a municipal government in New York City (the former Dutch settlement of New Amsterdam).
- June 13 (June 3 O.S.) – Second Anglo-Dutch War – Battle of Lowestoft: The English Navy, under James Stuart, Duke of York, is victorious against the Dutch.
- June 17 – Battle of Montes Claros between Spanish and a combined Anglo-Portuguese force ends with a decisive Portuguese victory.
- June 30 – King Charles II of England issues a second charter for the Province of Carolina, which clarifies and expands the borders of the Lords Proprietors' tracts.

==== July–September ====
- July 3 – The first documented case of cyclopia is diagnosed in a horse.
- July 7 – King Charles II of England leaves London with his entourage, fleeing the Great Plague. He moves his court to Salisbury, then Exeter.
- July 9 – The colonization of the south Indian Ocean island Réunion begins, with the Compagnie des Indes Orientales sending 20 permanent settlers, under the command of Etienne Regnault, from the French ship Taureau.
- July 11 – Pierre de Beausse, an envoy of France's King Louis XIV, formally claims possession of the African island of Madagascar on behalf of the French East India Company after landing on the coast in the 32-gun frigate Saint-Paul.
- August 2 – The Dutch fleet defeats the English in the Battle of Vågen off Norway in the Second Anglo-Dutch War.
- August 8 – The Great Plague forces the closure of the University of Cambridge, where Isaac Newton is a student. Newton retires to his home in Lincolnshire for safety, and stays there for two years. During this time alone, Newton will make groundbreaking discoveries in mathematics, calculus, mechanics and optics, and lay the foundations for his books Philosophiæ Naturalis Principia Mathematica and Optiks.
- August 27 – Ye Bare & Ye Cubbe, the first play in English in the American colonies, is given its first performance. The presentation takes place at Cowles Tavern in Pungoteague, Virginia. The event is documented in 1958 in a historical marker with the heading "The Bear and the Cub" which says "This first play recorded in the United States was presented August 27, 1665. The Accomack County Court at Pungoteague heard charges against three men 'for acting a play,' ordered inspection of costumes and script, but found the men 'not guilty.'"
- September 17 – Charles II of Spain becomes king while not yet four years old.
- September 22 – Molière's L'Amour médecin is first presented, before Louis XIV of France, at the Palace of Versailles, with music by Jean-Baptiste Lully.
- September – Robert Hooke's Micrographia is published in London, first applying the term 'cell' to plant tissue, which he discovered first in cork, then in living organisms, using a microscope.

==== October–December ====
- October 5 – Kiel University is founded in the Duchy of Holstein.
- October 21 – Louis XIV of France and Jean-Baptiste Colbert found the Manufacture royale des glaces of Saint Gobain, which is the oldest French company of the CAC 40, with 350 years in 2015.
- October 29 – Battle of Mbwila: Portuguese forces defeat and kill King António I of Kongo.
- November 7 – The London Gazette is first published as The Oxford Gazette.
- December 10 – The Royal Netherlands Marine Corps is founded by Michiel de Ruyter.

==== Date unknown ====
- Joan Blaeu completes publication of his Atlas Maior (Theatrum Orbis Terrarum) in Amsterdam.

=== 1666 ===
==== January–March ====
- January 17 – The Chair of Saint Peter (Cathedra Petri, designed by Bernini) is set above the altar in St. Peter's Basilica in Rome.
- January 27 – Mughal conquest of Chittagong: Mughal forces of Emperor Aurangzeb, in alliance with the Portuguese, under Shaista Khan and his son Buzurg Umed Khan, expel the Arakans from the Bengal port city of Chittagong, renaming the city as Islamabad.
- February 1 – The joint English and Scottish royal court returns to London as the Great Plague of London subsides.
- March 11 – The tower of St. Peter's Church, Riga, collapses, burying eight people in the rubble.
- March – The Tavernier Blue, precursor to the Hope Diamond, is first recorded, when French gem merchant Jean-Baptiste Tavernier purchases it from the Kollur Mine in the Mughal Empire in uncut form.

==== April–June ====
- April 20 – In colonial British North America, "Articles of Peace and Amity" are signed between the governments of the Province of Maryland and 12 Eastern Algonquian tribes — the Piscataways, Anacostancks, Doegs, Mattawomans, Portobackes, Chopticos, Mikikiwomans, Manasquesends, Chingwawateicks, Hangemaicks, Sacayos, and Panyayos.
- April 23 – On Saint Christopher Island more commonly called St Kitts, a Caribbean Sea island divided between colonies of England and France, a battle near Sandy Point Town over control of the territory ends with a victory by the French over a numerically-superior English force two days after English Deputy Governor William Watts of Anguilla had sent an expedition to capture the neighbouring island of Saint Martin. Governor Watts and the French Governor of Saint-Christophe, Charles de Sales, are both killed in the battle.
- May 12 – In India, General Shivaji Bhonsale of the Maratha Empire arrives at the Agra Fort for a meeting with Emperor Aurangzeb of the Mughal Empire, as part of the terms of peace under the 1665 Treaty of Purandar. After taking offence at the disrespect shown to him, he gets angry and attempts to leave; he and his son Sambhaji are immediately placed under arrest and imprisoned at the fort.
- May 13 – French theologian Louis-Isaac Lemaistre de Sacy is imprisoned in the Bastille after his conviction for heresy in connection with the Jansenist movement. Sacy uses his two and one-half years of incarceration (which lasts until November 14, 1668), to create the Bible du Port-Royal, a first French language rendition of the Bible, finishing a translation of the Old Testament from the Vulgate, written in Latin, that had been started by his brother Antoine, and then beginning work on the New Testament.
- May 21
  - The Holy Roman Empire, ruled by Leopold I, repurchases the territory of the Duchy of Opole and Racibórz (Oppeln und Ratibor), which it had ceded to Poland in 1645, for the sum of 120,000 guldens and consolidates it with Upper Silesia. The territory will be ceded from Germany to Poland in 1945 at the end of World War II.
  - Iliaș Alexandru becomes the ruler of Moldavia, part of modern-day Romania.
- June 4 – Molière's comedy of manners The Misanthrope is premièred at the Théâtre du Palais-Royal in Paris by the King's Players with himself in the title role.
- June 6 – Moulai al-Rashid is let into Fes by the city's Jews, establishing the power of Morocco's Alawi dynasty, which will continue into the 21st century.
- June 14 (June 4 Julian calendar) – The Four Days' Battle between the Dutch Republic fleet (84 ships under the command of Admiral Michiel de Ruyter) and the English Royal Navy (79 ships led by the Duke of Albemarle) in the North Sea, one of the longest naval engagements in history, ends with a retreat by the English after having started on June 11. A part of the Second Anglo-Dutch War, the battle ends with a Dutch victory, but heavy losses are sustained on both sides: the English lose 1,000 men and 10 ships are sunk, while the Dutch lose four ships and 1,550 men. Damaged, but not destroyed, the English fleet sets about repairs and refitting, and meets the Dutch fleet again on July 25 in the St. James's Day Battle.

==== July–September ====
- July 1 – During the Portuguese Restoration War between Portugal and Spain, the Battle of the Berlengas ends after four days as a fleet of 15 Spanish warships obtains the surrender of Fort of São João Baptista.
- July 6 – On 3 Muharram 1077 AH on the Muslim calendar, Sa'd ibn Zayd, a descendant of Hasan ibn Ali and of Muhammad (founder of Islam) becomes the new Sharif of Mecca, in modern-day Saudi Arabia. His ascension to the post follows the death of his father, Zayd ibn Muhsin, who had been the Sharif since 1631.
- July 13 – The Battle of Matwy, the bloodiest engagement of Lubomirski's rebellion, takes place in Poland at the village of Matwy. Jerzy Sebastian Lubomirski, who has led the revolt against Poland's King Jan II Kazimierz, defeats a larger number of troops led by John III Sobieski of the Polish-Lithuanian Commonwealth. Poland and Lithuania sustain 4,000 deaths compared to 200 rebel casualties.
- July 31 – The Agreement of Legonice is signed, with Poland restoring the titles of Jerzy Sebastian Lubomirski and Lubomirski's officers, granting amnesty to all the rebels, and King Jan II Kazimierz abandoning further reform plans.
- August 2 (July 23 Julian calendar) – A hurricane sweeps through the Caribbean Sea near Guadeloupe five days after Barbados colonial Governor Francis Willoughby led a force of two Royal Navy frigates, 12 commandeered vessels and over 1,000 men in a battle against French colonies during the Second Anglo-Dutch War. Willoughby and most of his crew die in the sinking of his flagship, HMS Hope
- August 4 (July 25 Julian calendar) – In the St. James's Day Battle of the Second Anglo-Dutch War, the English Royal Navy, under the command of Prince Rupert of the Rhine and George Monck, 1st Duke of Albemarle, defeats the Dutch Republic navy off the North Foreland of England. The victory comes 6 weeks after the British fleet had sustained a heavy loss in the Four Days' Battle. The Dutch ships Sneek and Tholen are sunk, with the loss of 800 men, while 300 Englishmen die in the sinking of HMS Resolution.
- August 17 – In India, General Shivaji Bhonsale, future ruler of the Maratha Empire, and his son Sambhaji escape from house arrest at the Agra Fort, where they have been held prisoner since May 12.
- August 19 (August 9 Julian calendar) – Rear Admiral Robert Holmes leads an English Royal Navy raid on the Dutch island of Terschelling, destroying 150 merchant ships in the Vlie estuary over a period of two days, and pillaging the town of West-Terschelling. The action becomes known as "Holmes's Bonfire".
- September 2 – The Great Fire of London begins as a blaze in a bakery owned by Thomas Farriner on Pudding Lane, near London Bridge. Over a period of four days, the fire destroys more than 13,000 buildings (including Old St Paul's Cathedral), but only six people are known to have died, while at least 80,000 are left destitute and homeless. The events are recorded by Samuel Pepys in his diary. The resurveying of property is credited with advancing both cartography and the practices of surveying, as well as resulting in the modern definition by John Ogilby of the statute mile, as 1,760 yards.
- September 4 – Mughal Emperor Aurangzeb grants the French East India Company a royal mandate to trade at the port of Surat.
- September 6 – The Cestui Que Vie Act 1666 is passed by the Parliament of England, to provide for the disposal of the property of missing persons.
- September 16 – The Apostasy of Sabbatai Zevi begins in Istanbul.

==== October–December ====
- October 10 – A "day of humiliation and fasting" is held in London churches a month after the Great Fire of London.
- October 11 – The Sieur de Buat, Captain Henri de Fleury de Coulan of the Army of the Dutch Republic, is beheaded in public at The Hague after being convicted of attempting to overthrow Dutch leader Johan de Witt.
- October 17 – In North America, a French Army regiment led by Alexandre de Prouville de Tracy erects crosses in the Mohawk lands of the eastern Iroquois Confederacy territory along the Mohawk River as part of an invasion that started on September 29. During the expedition, Prouville's forces find four abandoned Mohawk villages in the area, located in the modern U.S. state of New York near the village of Schenectady but never confront any Mohawk defenders, and the French never attempt to enforce their claim.
- October 23 – The most intense tornado on record in English history, an F4 storm on the Fujita scale or T8 on the TORRO scale, strikes the county of Lincolnshire with a path of destruction through the villages of Welbourn, Wellingore, Navenby and Boothby Graffoe, with winds of more than 213 miles per hour (343 km/h).
- October 26 – Abbas II, the Shah of Iran, dies at the age of 34 after a reign of 24 years, without designating a successor. His 18-year old son Sam Mirza is crowned as the new Safavid dynasty emperor six days later.
- October 27 – Robert Hubert, a Frenchman who has made a false confession to having started the Great Fire of London (despite not arriving in England until two days after the blaze started), is executed based on his statements.
- November 28 – The Battle of Rullion Green takes place in the Pentland Hills near Midlothian in Scotland as the culmination of the brief 'Pentland Rising' which began on November 15 as a rebellion by the Covenanters who oppose changes in the Church of Scotland. At least 2,000 men of the Scottish Royal Army, led by General Thomas Dalyell, defeat more than 750 Covenanter rebels who have been under the command of James Wallace of Auchens.
- December 12 – A sobor (church council) of the Russian Orthodox Church deposes Patriarch Nikon of Moscow, but accepts his liturgical reforms. Dissenters from these, known as Old Believers, continue into the 21st century.
- December 19 – Lund University is founded in Lund, Sweden.
- December 22 – The French Academy of Sciences, founded by Louis XIV, first meets.

==== Date unknown ====
- Isaac Newton uses a prism to split sunlight, as referenced in his alchemical works as Lux Dei, into the component colours of the optical spectrum, assisting the understanding of the scientific nature of light. He also develops differential calculus simultaneously with Leibniz. His discoveries this year lead to it being referred to as his Annus mirabilis or Newton's "Year of the Morning Star".
- Jean Talon completes a census of New France, the first census in North America.
- Dutch artist Johannes Vermeer paints The Art of Painting, his largest and most complex work.
- The first completed printed Bible translation into Armenian, Astuacašunč hnoc' ew noroc' ktakaranac (Oskanean Bible), is published in Amsterdam, edited by Bishop Oskan Yerevantsi.

=== 1667 ===
==== January–March ====
- January 11 – Aurangzeb, monarch of the Mughal Empire, orders the removal of Rao Karan Singh as Maharaja of the Bikaner State (part of the modern-day Rajasthan state of India) because of Karan's dereliction of duty in battle.
- January 19 – The town of Anzonico in Switzerland is destroyed by an avalanche.
- January 27 – The 2,000 seat Opernhaus am Taschenberg, a theater in Dresden (capital of the Electorate of Saxony) opens with its first production, Pietro Ziani's opera Il teseo.
- February 5 – In the Second Anglo-Dutch War, the English Royal Navy warship HMS Saint Patrick is captured less than nine months after being launched, when it fights a battle off the coast of England and North Foreland, Kent. Captain Robert Saunders and 8 of his crew are killed while fighting the Dutch ships Delft and Shakerlo. The Dutch Navy renames the ship the Zwanenburg.
- February 6 (January 27 O.S.) – The Treaty of Andrusovo is signed during the Russo-Polish War. Poland cedes eastern Ukraine, including Kyiv and Smolensk, to Russia, ending Poland's status as a major Central European power.
- February 8 – The first part of the Rebuilding of London Act 1666, following the destruction by the Great Fire of London of 1666, goes into effect as royal assent is given to the Fire of London Disputes Act 1666, which establishes the Fire Court. The Court, sitting at Clifford's Inn near Fleet Street, hears cases starting on February 27 and continuing until the end of 1668.
- February 22 – The Lejonkulan ("lion's den") opens at Stockholm in Sweden as the first permanent theater in Scandinavia, with the performance of Jean Magnon's Orontes en Satira.
- February 25 – During the Second Anglo-Dutch War, a Dutch Navy force commanded by Admiral Abraham Crijnssen arrives at the English colony of Surinam in South America and sails up the Suriname River to Fort Willoughby (later Fort Zeelandia at Paramaribo). Bombardment of the fort begins the next day, and its commander, William Byam surrenders, effectively giving control of Surinam to the Dutch Republic. The cession is confirmed with the signing of the Peace of Breda on July 31.
- February 27 (February 17 O.S.) – Joasaphus II is elected by the Council of Bishops as the new Patriarch of Moscow, leader of the Russian Orthodox Church, after conservative clerics depose Patriarch Nikon for his reformation of the Church.
- March 27 – In North America (Canada), explorer René-Robert Cavelier, Sieur de La Salle is released from the Society of Jesus (Jesuits).
- March – Louis XIV of France abolishes the livre parisis (Paris pound), in favor of the much more widely used livre tournois (Tours pound). He also designates Gabriel Nicolas de la Reynie as the first chief of "police" of Paris.

==== April–June ====
- April 6 – The 1667 Dubrovnik earthquake in the Republic of Ragusa (part of modern-day Croatia) kills as many as 5,000 people, roughly one sixth of the population, and levels most of the buildings in Dubrovnik.
- April 27 – The blind, impoverished, 58-year-old John Milton seals a contract for publication of Paradise Lost with London printer Samuel Simmons, for an initial payment of £5. The first edition is published in October and sells out in eighteen months.
- May 1 – A Dutch flotilla under Admiral van Ghent enters the Firth of Forth.
- May 8 – Prince Prithviraj Singh, eldest son of the Maharaja Jaswant Singh of the Kingdom of Marwar (within India's Mughal Empire, part of the modern-day Rajasthan state) dies painfully at the age of 14, supposedly after putting on a khalat (a ceremonial robe) given to him by the Mughal Emperor Aurangzeb. According to the folklore of Marwar, the khalat was actually a garment infused with poison that penetrated the skin.
- May 22 – Fabio Chigi, Pope Alexander VII, dies at the age of 68 after a reign of 12 years. The election to find a successor opens on June 2.
- May 24 – After King Philip IV of Spain reneges on payment of a large dowry to King Louis XIV of France, promised to Louis as a gift for Louis' marriage to Philip's daughter Princess Maria Theresa, the War of Devolution begins between France and Spain. The French Army invades the Spanish Netherlands (modern-day Belgium), entering Flanders and Franche-Comté. By the time the war ends on May 2, 1668, parts of the Spanish Netherlands are ceded to France.
- June 15 – The first human blood transfusion is administered by Dr. Jean-Baptiste Denys. He transfuses the blood of a sheep to a 15-year-old boy. (Though this operation is a success, a later patient dies from the procedure and Denys is accused of murder).
- June 19–24 – The raid on the Medway in England is carried out when a fleet from the Dutch Republic under Admiral Michiel de Ruyter takes Sheerness fort, sails up the River Medway, raids Chatham Dockyard, and tows away the royal flagship The Royal Charles.
- June 20 – Giulio Rospigliosi is elected by the College of Cardinals to succeed the late Pope Alexander VII, after receiving 61 of the 64 votes of the cardinals present. He takes the regnal name Pope Clement IX, becoming the 238th head of the Roman Catholic Church.
- June 26 – Louis XIV of France conquers Tournai.
- June 27 – George Villiers, Duke of Buckingham, one of the five members of the Cabal ministry in England (Lords Chudleigh, Arlington, Buckingham, Ashley and Lauderdale), turns himself in after a warrant for his arrest is issued on February 25 on charges of treason (including the casting of the horoscope of King Charles II). He is held in the Tower of London for four years before being released on July 17, 1671.

==== July–September ====
- July 31 – Second Anglo-Dutch War – The Treaty of Breda ends the war by England against the Dutch Republic, France and Denmark and Norway. In the Americas, the Dutch retain control of Surinam, the English retain New Netherland and the French Acadia.
- August 5 – The province of Holland in the Dutch Republic passes the "Perpetual Edict" declaring that it will no longer acknowledge the authority of the republic's Stadtholder, and other provinces soon follow suit.
- August 10 – The Siege of Lille, at this time part of the Spanish Netherlands (modern-day Belgium) begins and becomes the only major engagement of the "War of Devolution" between France and Spain. The Spanish Army surrenders after 16 days.
- August 15
  - The League of the Rhine is dissolved by agreement of its members, nine years and one day after its formation as a military alliance between German kingdoms in the western part of the Holy Roman Empire.
  - John Dryden's comedy Sir Martin Mar-all, or The Feign'd Innocence is given its first performance, presented by the players of the King's Theatre in London.
- August 18 – In an effort to prevent narrow streets from being blocked from all light by tall buildings, the city of Paris enacts its first building code limiting the height of new construction. Buildings may be no taller than eight toise – 15.6 metres (51 ft) – tall. In 1783, rules are implemented to consider the width of the street.
- August 24 – The Treaty of Breda goes into effect after having been signed on July 31, bringing an end to hostilities between England and its three opponents.
- August 25 – In China, 14-year-old Xuanye, the Kangxi Emperor, participates in an ascension ceremony to take full power to rule China, bringing an end to the domination of the "Four Regents" who had been ruling in his name when he had first inherited the throne at the age of 6. The move comes shortly after the August 12 death of one of the regents, Sonin, when it becomes clear that the regents were planning to expand their power in advance of Kangxi's coming of age.
- September 6 – The "Dreadful Hurricane of 1667" ravages southeast Virginia, bringing 12 days of rain, blowing down plantation homes and stripping fields of crops.

==== October–December ====
- October 18 – Yohannes I becomes king of Ethiopia, following the death of his father Negus Fasilides.
- November 2 – In India, Assam troops led by General Lachit Borphukan, dispatched by King Supangmung, captures the Mughal Empire city of Guwahati after a victory in battle at Itakhuli.
- November 25 – A devastating earthquake rocks Caucasia and kills 80,000 people.
- December 19 – Emperor Aurangzeb, ruler of the Mughal Empire in India, orders a massive counterattack on Assam's Ahom kingdom after learning that Mughal troops had captured Guwahati. Aurangzeb appoints Raja Ram Singh to command a force of 36,000 infantry, 18,000 cavalry, 2,000 archers and 40 ships to conquer Ahom. The war lasts until the defeat of the Mughals by the smaller Ahom force in March 1671.

==== Date unknown ====
- After Shivaji's escape, hostilities between the Marathas and the Mughals ebb, with Mughal sardar Jaswant Singh acting as intermediary between Shivaji and Aurangzeb for new peace proposals.
- The first military campaign of Stenka Razin is conducted in Russia.
- The French army uses grenadiers.
- Robert Hooke demonstrates that the alteration of the blood in the lungs is essential for respiration.
- Isaac Newton has investigated and written on optics, acoustics, the infinitesimal calculus, mechanism and thermodynamics. The works will be published only years later.

=== 1668 ===
==== January–March ====
- January 23 – The Triple Alliance of 1668 is formed between England, Sweden and the United Provinces of the Netherlands.
- February 13 – In Lisbon, a peace treaty is established between Afonso VI of Portugal and Carlos II of Spain, by mediation of Charles II of England, in which the legitimacy of the Portuguese monarch is recognized. Portugal yields Ceuta to Spain.
- c. February – The English Parliament and bishops seek to suppress Thomas Hobbes' treatise Leviathan.
- March 8 – In the Cretan War, the navy of the Republic of Venice defeats an Ottoman Empire naval force of 12 ships and 2,000 galleys that had attempted to seize a small Venetian galley near the port of Agia Pelagia.
- March 22 – Notable Privateer Henry Morgan lands in Cuba to raid and plunder the inland town of Puerto del Príncipe during the latter stages of the Anglo-Spanish War (1654–1660).
- March 23 – The Bawdy House Riots of 1668 take place in London when a group of English Dissenters begins attacking brothels, initially as a protest against the harsh enforcement of laws against private worshippers and the lack of enforcement of laws against prostitution. Over a period of three days, rioters who join in the violence destroy brothels in the London districts of Poplar, Moorfields, East Smithfield, St Leonard's, Shoreditch, St Andrew's and Holborn.
- March 27 – King Charles II of England signs an agreement with representatives of the English East India Company to lease the Indian city of Bombay (modern-day Mumbai) to the company for a rent of 10 pounds sterling per year, with transfer taking effect on September 21.

==== April–June ====
- April 21 – Henry Brouncker is expelled from the English House of Commons for treason during the 1665 Battle of Lowestoft during the Second Anglo-Dutch War.
- April 22 – Tenzin Dalai Khan is proclaimed as the new Protector King of Tibet by the 5th Dalai Lama, following the death of Tenzin's father, Dayan Khan.
- April 24 – The Treaty of Breda, signed in 1667 and ending the Second Anglo-Dutch War, goes into effect worldwide.
- April 25 – The Swedish Empire signs a treaty with England and the Dutch Republic to join the Triple Alliance.
- May 2 – The first Treaty of Aix-la-Chapelle ends the War of Devolution.
- May 18 – Charles Sedley's comedy The Mulberry-Garden premieres at the Theatre Royal in London.
- June 4 – Tangier, a city in Morocco that had come under control of the English colonial empire in 1661, is elevated by the English crown to the status of "free city".
- June 12 – John Dryden's play An Evening's Love, or The Mock Astrologer premieres at the Theatre Royal in London in a performance by the King's Company players for King Charles and Queen Catherine.
- June 16 – A group of Spanish Jesuit missionaries become the first European settlers to arrive at the island of Guam, founding a mission to convert the Chamorro people of the Mariana Islands to Christianity.
- June 18 – Petro Doroshenko is proclaimed by the Russian Empire as the hetman of all of Ukraine, after having previously been granted leadership of the western half. Ivan Briukhovetsky, who had ruled the eastern half and then led an uprising, is executed on the same day.

==== July–September ====
- July 7 – Bishop Isaac Barrow founds the Bishop Barrow Trust with the intention of establishing a university on the Isle of Man; this becomes King William's College.
- July 10 – Henry Morgan's raid on Porto Bello: Welsh privateer Henry Morgan and 450 men under his command plunder the city of Portobello on the Isthmus of Panama and spend 14-days in the attack before withdrawing.
- July 25 – The magnitude 8.5 Shandong earthquake kills at least 43,000 people in China's Shandong province.
- August 17 – The magnitude 8.0 North Anatolia earthquake causes 8,000 deaths in northern Anatolia, Ottoman Empire, and is the most powerful earthquake recorded in Turkey.
- September 9 – Molière's comedy The Miser (L'Avare) is first performed, in Paris.
- September 16 – Jan II Kazimierz Waza abdicates his titles of King of Poland and Grand Duke of Lithuania after a 20-year reign.
- September 21 – The British East India Company takes over Bombay under a Royal Charter of March 27.
- September 28 – Diego de Salcedo is overthrown from his position as the Spanish Governor-General of the Philippines in a coup d'etat led by Juan Manuel de la Peña Bonifaz. Salcedo and other members of his administration are jailed and then sent into exile from Luzon to the island of Panay, and his fortune is confiscated.

==== October –December ====
- October 5 (September 25 O.S.) – The English blockade of the Moroccan port of Salé begins as HMS Garland and HMS Francis retaliate for raids from the port by the Barbary pirates. The blockade lasts for 10 days.
- October 7 – French Jesuit missionary Jean Pierron arrives at the Mohawk Nation city of Tionondogen (near modern-day Palatine, New York, U.S.) to replace Jacques Frémin in attempting to convert members of the Iroquois tribe to Christianity.
- October 31 – The English ship HMS Providence is wrecked at Tangier on the North African coast.
- November 8 – Iliaș Alexandru steps down as the voivode or elected ruler of Moldavia (now part of Romania and the Republic of Moldova) and is replaced by his predecessor, Gheorghe Duca.
- December 6 – The Order of the Jesuati, founded in 1360 by Giovanni Colombini, is abolished by Pope Clement IX.
- December 16 – In China, the 1661 edict of the "Great Clearance", the forcible evacuation of the coastal areas of Guangdong, Fujian, Zhejiang, Jiangnan, and Shandong in order to fight a rebellion, is rescinded by the Kangxi Emperor after lobbying by Zhou Youde, the Viceroy of Liangguang.
- December 28 – Fritz Cronman arrives in Moscow as the Swedish Empire's ambassador to the Russian Empire, accompanied by a staff of 35 people.

==== Date unknown ====
- One of the world's earliest central banks, the Sveriges Riksbank, is founded in Stockholm, Sweden.
- Emperor Yohannes I of Ethiopia convenes a church council in Gondar, which decides to expel all Roman Catholics from the country.
- English scientist Isaac Newton builds the first reflecting telescope (Newton's reflector).

=== 1669 ===
==== January–March ====
- January 2 – Pirate Henry Morgan of Wales holds a meeting of his captains on board his ship, the former Royal Navy frigate Oxford, and an explosion in the ship's gunpowder supply kills 200 of his crew and four of the pirate captains who had attended the summit.
- January 4 – A 5.7 magnitude earthquake strikes the city of Shamakhi in Iran (now in Azerbaijan) and kills 7,000 people. Fourteen months earlier, an earthquake in Shamakhi killed 80,000 people.
- February 13 – The first performance of the Ballet de Flore, a joint collaboration of Jean-Baptiste Lully and Isaac de Benserade is given, premiering at the Palais du Louvre in Paris. King Louis XIV finances the performance and even appears in a minor role in the production as a dancer.
- February 23 – Isaac Newton writes his first description of his new invention, the reflecting telescope.
- March 11 – Mount Etna erupts, destroying the Sicilian town of Nicolosi.
- March 28 – Radu Leon is deposed by the Ottoman Sultan as Prince of Wallachia (now part of Romania and is replaced by Antonie Vodă din Popești.

==== April–June ====
- April 9 – Aurangzeb, the Muslim Emperor of the Mughal Empire in India, issues a firman decree for the protection of all Hindu temples and schools in his kingdom.
- May 1 – the Spanish Armada de Barlovento is defeated by an English Privateer fleet led by Captain Henry Morgan during his raid on Lake Maracaibo.
- May 19 – The first people executed in Sweden's Mora witch trial are put to death, with seven women and one man beheaded after being convicted of "abduction of children to Satan."
- May 31 – Samuel Pepys stops writing his diary.
- June 22 – Roux de Marsilly, accused of plotting the assassination of King Louis XIV of France, is publicly tortured in Paris, France.
- June 25 – François de Vendôme, Duke of Beaufort, disappears in battle, during the siege of Candia in Crete.

==== July–September ====
- July 13 – Trịnh Tạc, the warlord who administers the Kingdom of Vietnam, issues an order banning all foreign vessels from entering the harbor at Hanoi, requiring to anchor no closer than the river port at Pho Hien, 35 miles (56 km) down the Red River from Hanoi.
- July 16 – A rockfall from the Mönchsberg mountain above Salzburg in Austria kills 230 people as tons of the mountainside fall onto a neighborhood on a street, the Gstättengasse.
- July 24 – During an attempt by a fleet of French Navy ships to stop the siege of Candia by bombardment of Ottoman positions on the island of Crete, the arsenal of gunpowder on the French flagship, the 56-gun warship Thérèse, catches fire and explodes. Out of 350 crew on the Thérèse, only seven survive. Demoralized, the remaining French commanders halt the bombardment and the fleet withdraws.
- July 25 – Pieter Bickel, a Lutheran pastor and a mountaineer in Austria, becomes the first person to climb to the peak of the tallest of the Southeastern Walsertal Mountains, the 8,310 foot (2,530 m) Großer Widderstein.
- July – The Hanseatic League, after 400 years of operation, holds its last official meeting, taking place at the city of Lübeck. At its height, the economic alliance of German cities had 180 members; only nine (Lübeck, Hamburg, Bremen, Danzig, Braunschweig, Cologne, Hildesheim, Osnabrück and Rostock) are represented for the final gathering. The final series of meetings had started on May 29.
- August 17 – A group of English settlers, led by Joseph West, departs from The Downs on the ship Carolina with instructions to make the first European settlement in the modern-day U.S. state of South Carolina. After a long voyage with stops in Ireland and Barbados, the Carolina settlers arrive at Port Royal on March 17 next.
- August 24 – "The Man in the Iron Mask", a prisoner identified as "Eustache Dauger", arrives at the French fortress of Pignerol, with Bénigne Dauvergne de Saint-Mars in charge of his incarceration. The identity of the prisoner is kept secret with a mask – actually of velvet – over his face, so legends as to his true identity grow.
- August 25 – The day after the verdicts at the Mora witch trial in Sweden, 14 women and one man are publicly beheaded after having confessed to various crimes involving the use of "enchanted tools" on behalf of the Devil. Another 47 are convicted and taken away for a later execution.
- September 6 – Francesco Morosini, capitano generale of the Venetian forces in the siege of Candia, surrenders to the Ottomans.
- September 23 – Leopold I, Holy Roman Emperor grants the status and privileges of a university to the Jesuit Academy in Zagreb, the precursor to the modern University of Zagreb.
- September 29 – The formal coronation of Michał Korybut Wiśniowiecki as King of Poland (and Grand Duke of Lithuania) takes place in Kraków.

==== October–December ====
- October 4 – Dutch painter Rembrandt van Rijn dies at the age of 63, after completing his final known work Self-Portrait at the Age of 63. Despite his wealth, is buried in an unmarked grave in Amsterdam's Westerkerk. After 20 years, his remains are removed and destroyed in accordance with church custom.
- October 6 – Molière's comedy ballet Monsieur de Pourceaugnac (with music by Jean-Baptiste Lully and choreography by Pierre Beauchamp is performed for the first time, premiering at the Château of Chambord.
- October 9 – The English ship Nonsuch returns to London with the first products acquired from trade around Canada's Hudson Bay, a cargo of fine furs. The bounty from the Nonsuch expedition attracts investors for the soon-to-be-chartered Hudson's Bay Company.
- October 15 – The University of Innsbruck is chartered in Austria by Leopold I, Holy Roman Emperor. After being reduced to a lesser function on November 29, 1781, it is rechartered in 1826.
- October 19 – The Parliament of Scotland holds its first new session in six years (although two Conventions of Estates had been held briefly in 1665 and 1667). The session is opened in Edinburgh by Charles II of England in his capacity as King of Scotland.
- October 29 – Ukrainian Cossack General Mykhailo Khanenko is defeated by Petro Doroshenko at the Battle of Stebliv after attempting to wrest control of Ukraine's territory on the west side of the Dnieper River from Doroshenko.
- November 28 – In India, the Mughal Emperor Aurangzeb learns of a rebellion of Hindu residents of in various parts of the Mathurá where he had given the order for the destruction of non-Muslim temples, with rioting in Mauza' Rewarah, Chandarkah, and Surkhrú. The Emperor's historian, Saqi Mustaid Khan, records Aurangzeb's dispatch of General Hasan 'Ali Khán to attack the rebels, and 300 of them are "sent to perdition" while the Mughals lose "many imperial soldiers". Another 250 surviving rebels are arrested. Kokilá Ját, leader of the rebels, is among the prisoners put to death a month later.
- December 8 – The Sultanate of Bima, located on the now-Indonesian island of Sumbawa and ruled by Abu'l-Khair Sirajuddin, surrenders its authority to the Dutch East Indies Company, the VOC.
- December 9 – Pope Clement IX dies at the age of 69 after a reign of two and a half years.
- December 13 – Jean Racine's five-act tragic play Britannicus is performed for the first time, premiering at the Hôtel de Bourgogne in Paris. The play continues to be performed more than 350 years later, including a 2011 version translated by Dr. Howard Rubenstein.
- December 18 – The Battle of Cádiz begins off of the coast of the Spanish city as the English warship HMS Mary Rose encounters seven pirate ships from Algeria. Although none of the ships on either side are sunk, the Algerians are forced to retreat with an unknown number of casualties, and the Mary Rose loses 12 dead and 18 wounded.
- December 21 – A papal conclave that will last for four months begins in Rome to select a successor to Pope Clement IX, who had died 12 days earlier. At the opening, 54 of the 70 members of the College of Cardinals are present. At least 21 Cardinals are considered for the papacy before Emilio Altieri is selected on April 29 to become Pope Clement X.

==== Date unknown ====
- Shakushain's revolt breaks out in Hokkaido, Japan.
- Ottoman units burn the eastern part of Kolárovo.
- The Chinese Kangxi Emperor allows coastal residents deported in the Great Clearance of 1662 to return home.
- Famine in Bengal kills 3 million people.
- Phosphorus is discovered by German alchemist Hennig Brand, the first chemical element to be discovered that was not known since ancient times.
- Antonio Stradivari makes his first violin in Cremona.
- Okaya & Co. is founded as Sasaya, a trading company in Nagoya, Japan.
- The Chinese herbal medicine company Tong Ren Tang (同仁堂) is established in Beijing.
- Blaise Pascal's Pensées is posthumously published in Paris.
- Jan Swammerdam publishes his Algemeene Verhandeling van de bloedeloose dierkens, a groundbreaking work in microscopy, as well as entomology.
- The Orange College of Breda is wound up.
- Jean Picard begins measurement of 1 degree of Earth's meridian arc in France.

== Births ==
1660

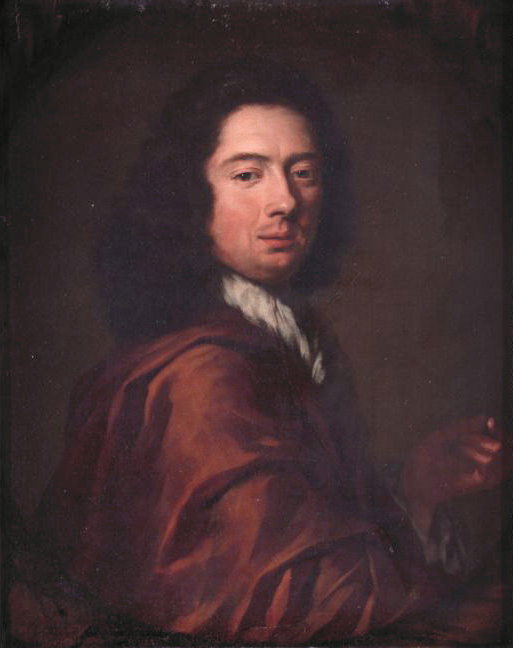
Arnold Houbraken

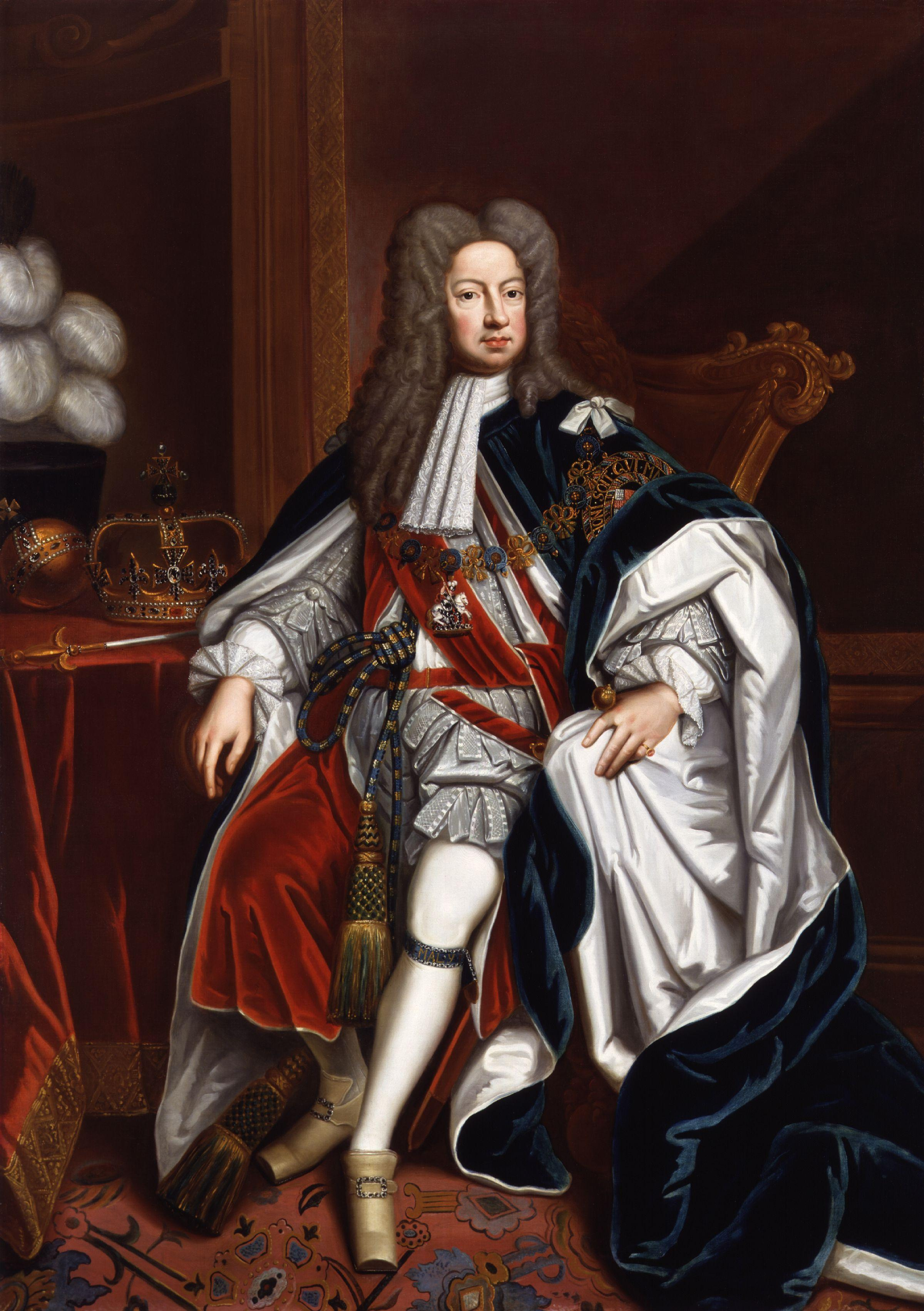
George I of Great Britain

- January 2 – Francis Hutchinson, Irish bishop (d. 1739)
- January 14 – Joseph Boyse, Presbyterian minister (d. 1728)
- January 27 – Felice Cignani, Italian painter (d. 1724)
- January – Hippolyte Hélyot, French historian (d. 1716)
- February 13 – Johann Sigismund Kusser, German composer (d. 1727)
- February 19 – Friedrich Hoffmann, German physician and chemist (d. 1742)
- February 20 – Leonhard Dientzenhofer, German architect (d. 1707)
- February 24 – John Murray, 1st Duke of Atholl (d. 1724)
- March 5 – George Stanhope, Dean of Canterbury (d. 1728)
- March 9 – Franz Joseph Feuchtmayer, German sculptor (d. 1718)
- March 12 – Zofia Czarnkowska Opalińska, mother-in-law of King Stanislaus I of Poland (d. 1701)
- March 15 – Olof Rudbeck the Younger, Swedish scientist and explorer (d. 1740)
- March 24 – Filippo Antonio Gualterio, Italian Catholic cardinal (d. 1728)
- March 25 – Samuel Crellius, Arian philosopher and theologian (d. 1747)
- March 28 – Arnold Houbraken, Dutch painter (d. 1719)
- April 6 – Johann Kuhnau, German composer, organist and harpsichordist (d. 1722)
- April 16 – Hans Sloane, British physician (d. 1753)
- April 19 – Sebastián Durón, Spanish composer (d. 1716)
- April 24 – Cornelis Dusart, Dutch painter (d. 1704)
- By May – Anne Killigrew, English poet and painter (d. 1685)
- May 2 – Alessandro Scarlatti, Italian composer (d. 1725)
- May 5 – David Leslie, 3rd Earl of Leven, British politician (d. 1728)
- May 20 – Andreas Schlüter, German sculptor (d. 1714)
- June 3 – Johannes Schenck, Dutch musician and composer (d. 1712)
- June 5 – Sarah Churchill, Duchess of Marlborough, British aristocrat (d. 1744)
- June 7 – King George I of Great Britain (d. 1727)
- June 17 – Jan van Mieris, Dutch painter (d. 1690)
- July 24 – Charles Talbot, 1st Duke of Shrewsbury, English politician (d. 1718)
- July 27 – Johann Patkul, Livonian nobleman, politician (d. 1707)
- August 2 – Luis Francisco de la Cerda, Spanish noble, politician (d. 1711)
- August 11 – Henrietta Wentworth, 6th Baroness Wentworth of England (d. 1686)
- August 17 – Sir Richard Bulkeley, 2nd Baronet of England (d. 1710)
- August 21 – Hubert Gautier, French engineer (d. 1737)
- August 27
  - Robert Wroth, British politician (d. 1720)
  - Claude-François Fraguier, French churchman, writer (d. 1728)
- September 2 – Louis Chéron, French painter (d. 1725)
- September 25 – Willem Verschuring, Dutch painter (d. 1726)
- September 26 – George William, Duke of Liegnitz (d. 1675)
- September – Daniel Defoe, English writer (d. 1731)
- October 20 – Robert Bertie, 1st Duke of Ancaster and Kesteven, English statesman (d.1723)
- October 21 – Georg Ernst Stahl, German physician and chemist (d. 1734)
- October 22 – Charles Stuart, Duke of Cambridge (d. 1661)
- October 30
  - Albrecht Konrad Finck von Finckenstein, German general (d. 1735)
  - Ernest August, Duke of Schleswig-Holstein-Sonderburg-Augustenburg (d. 1731)
- November 4
  - Albert Angell, Norwegian civil servant (d. 1705)
  - Samuel Russell, Minister of Branford, Yale co-founder (d. 1731)
- November 7 – Ferdinand Johann Adam von Pernau, Austrian ornithologist (d. 1731)
- November 11 – Francesco Maria de' Medici, Duke of Rovere and Montefeltro, Italian Catholic cardinal (d. 1711)
- November 15 – Hermann von der Hardt, German historian (d. 1746)
- November 20 – Daniel Ernst Jablonski, Czech bishop (d. 1741)
- November 22 – Franz Karl of Auersperg, Prince of Auersperg, Duke of Münsterberg (1705–1713) (d. 1713)
- November 28 – Duchess Maria Anna Victoria of Bavaria (d. 1690)
- November 30 – Victor-Marie d'Estrées, Marshal of France (d. 1737)
- December – Massimo Santoro Tubito, Italian priest and writer (d. unknown)
- December 4 – André Campra, French composer (d. 1744)
- December 18 – Countess Johanna Magdalene of Hanau-Lichtenberg, German countess (d. 1715)
- December 25 – Charles Somerset, Marquess of Worcester, English politician (d. 1698)
- December 26 – Peter Schenk the Elder, German engraver and cartographer (d. 1711)
- December 27 – Veronica Giuliani, Italian Capuchin mystic (d. 1727)
- date unknown
  - Chen Shu, Chinese painter (d. 1736)
  - Johann Joseph Fux, Austrian composer (d. 1741)
  - Jeanne Dumée, French astronomer (d. 1706)
  - Thomas Southerne, Irish playwright (d. 1746)

1661

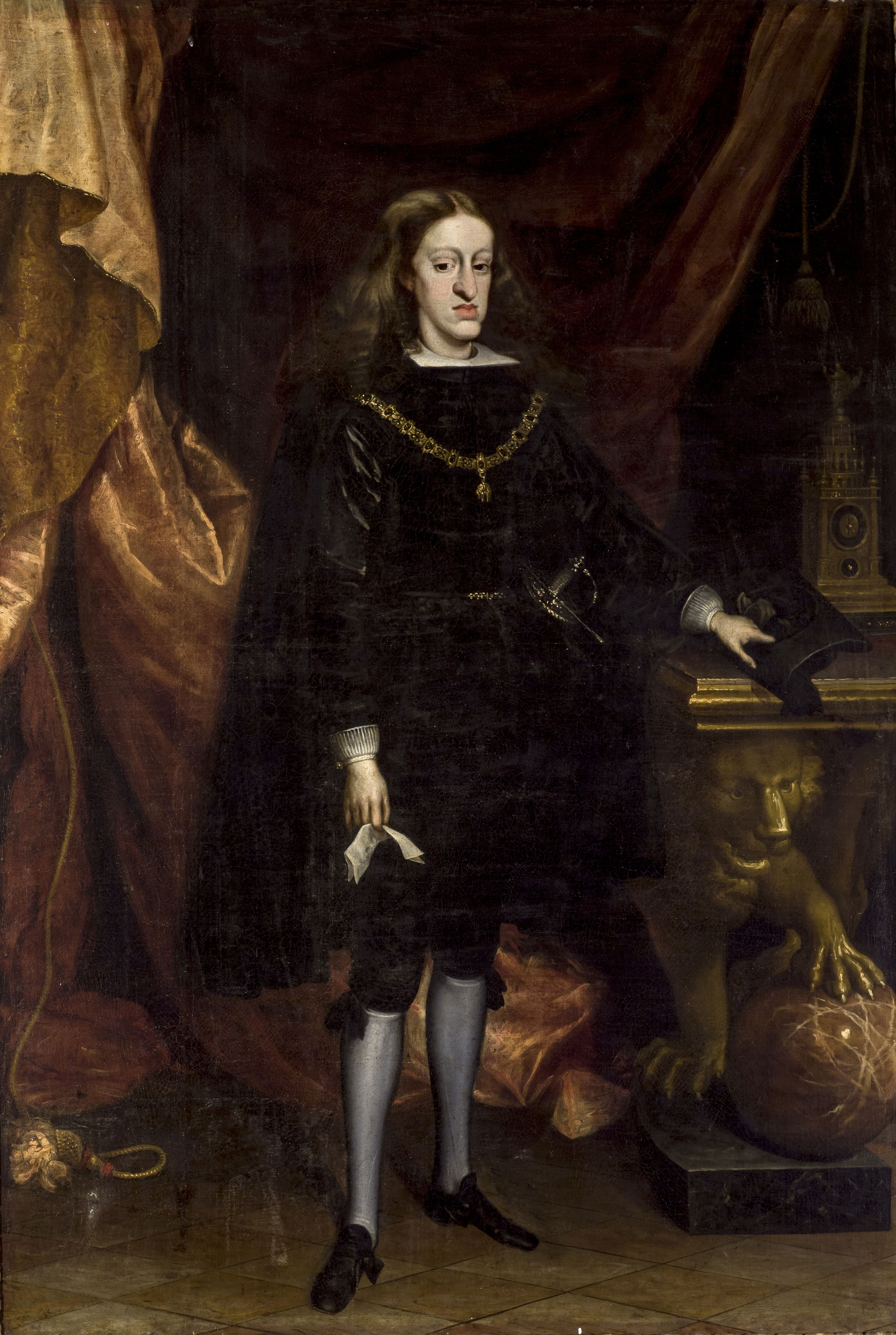
Charles II of Spain

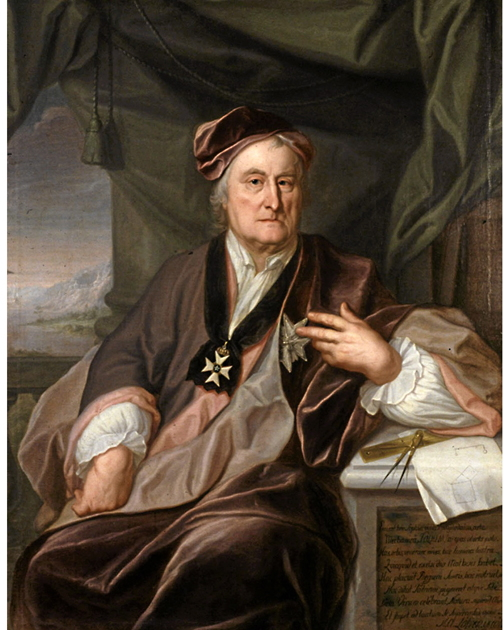
Christopher Polhem

- January 15 – James Barry, Irish politician (d. 1725)
- January 21 – Peter Le Neve, English herald and antiquary (d. 1729)
- January 22 – Joseph Fleuriau d'Armenonville, French politician (d. 1728)
- January 25 – Alexander zu Dohna-Schlobitten, German general (d. 1728)
- January 25 – Antonio I, Prince of Monaco, Monegasque prince (d. 1731)
- January 30 – Charles Rollin, French historian (d. 1741)
- February 12 – Daniel d'Auger de Subercase, French naval officer, governor of Newfoundland (d. 1732)
- February 20 – William Digby, 5th Baron Digby, English politician, baron (d. 1752)
- February 24 – Alexandre-François Desportes, French painter (d. 1743)
- February 25 – Anne Lennard, Countess of Sussex, English Countess (d. 1721)
- February 28 – Tripo Kokolja, Venetian painter (d. 1713)
- March 19 – Francesco Gasparini, Italian composer and teacher (d. 1727)
- March 25 – Paul de Rapin, French historian (d. 1725)
- April 11 – Antoine Coypel, French painter (d. 1722)
- April 13 – Jacques L'enfant, French Protestant pastor (d. 1728)
- April 14 – Sir Thomas Molyneux, 1st Baronet, Irish politician (d. 1733)
- April 16 – Charles Montagu, 1st Earl of Halifax, English poet and statesman (d. 1715)
- April 21 – Georg Joseph Kamel, Jesuit missionary and botanist (d. 1706)
- April 23 – Issachar Berend Lehmann, German-Jewish banker, Court Jew in Hanover (d. 1730)
- April 30 – Louis Armand I, Prince of Conti (d. 1685)
- May 3 – Antonio Vallisneri, Italian scientist (d. 1730)
- May 7 – Sophie Marie of Hesse-Darmstadt, only Duchess by marriage of Saxe-Eisenberg (d. 1712)
- May 7 – George Clarke, English politician, architect (d. 1736)
- May 25 – Claude Buffier, French philosopher and historian (d. 1737)
- June 1 – Louis Bartholomew Załuski, Polish cardinal, Auxiliary Bishop of Przemysl (d. 1721)
- June 1 – Gaspard Rigaud, French painter (d. 1705)
- June 6 – Giacomo Antonio Perti, Italian composer (d. 1756)
- June 9 – Tsar Feodor III of Russia (d. 1682)
- June 24 – Hachisuka Tsunanori, Japanese daimyō who ruled the Tokushima Domain (d. 1730)
- July 7 – Henri, Duke of Elbeuf, member of the House of Lorraine (d. 1748)
- July 11 – Charles, Prince of Commercy, French field marshal (d. 1702)
- July 15 – Pierre Le Moyne d'Iberville, French founder of the colony of Louisiana (d. 1706)
- July 29 – Christian Heinrich, Margrave of Brandenburg-Bayreuth-Kulmbach, German prince (d. 1708)
- July 31 – Ignaz Agricola, German historian (d. 1729)
- August 8 – Johann Matthias von der Schulenburg, German aristocrat and general (d. 1747)
- August 11 – William Churchill, English politician (d. 1737)
- August 15 – King Sukjong of Joseon (d. 1720)
- August 22 – Joseph Sheffield, Colonial Rhode Island Attorney General (d. 1706)
- August 31
  - Philippe Emanuel, Prince of Hornes (d. 1718)
  - Charles Granville, 2nd Earl of Bath, English diplomat (d. 1701)
- September 2 – Georg Böhm, German composer and organist (d. 1733)
- September 2 – Heinrich, Duke of Saxe-Merseburg (d. 1738)
- September 7 – Gunno Dahlstierna, Swedish poet (d. 1709)
- September 23 – Christiana Oxenstierna, Swedish noble (d. 1701)
- September 28 – Mehr-un-Nissa, daughter of Mughal emperor Aurangzeb and his concubine Aurangabadi Mahal (d. 1706)
- October 1 – Sir Matthew Dudley, 2nd Baronet, English Member of Parliament (d. 1721)
- October 4 – Jean-Paul Le Gardeur, French explorer, New France soldier (d. 1738)
- October 6 – William Dunbar, Scottish bishop (d. 1746)
- October 11 – Melchior de Polignac, French diplomat and cardinal (d. 1742)
- October 22 – Margaret Holles, Duchess of Newcastle-upon-Tyne, English noblewoman, fourth of six children of Henry Cavendish (d. 1717)
- October 27 – Fyodor Apraksin, Russian admiral (d. 1728)
- November 1
  - Florent Carton Dancourt, French dramatist and actor (d. 1725)
  - Louis, Grand Dauphin, eldest son and heir of Louis XIV of France (d. 1711)
- November 4 – Karl III Philip, Elector Palatine (d. 1742)
- November 6 – King Charles II of Spain (d. 1700)
- November 13 – Erdmuthe Dorothea of Saxe-Zeitz, consort of Duke Christian II of Saxe-Merseburg (d. 1720)
- November 15 – Christoph von Graffenried, Swiss settler in America (d. 1743)
- November 15 – Henri, Count of Brionne, French noble (d. 1713)
- November 18 – Elisabeth Henriette of Hesse-Kassel, daughter of William VI (d. 1683)
- November 28 – Margravine Dorothea Charlotte of Brandenburg-Ansbach, German noblewomen (d. 1705)
- November 28 – Edward Hyde, 3rd Earl of Clarendon, British Governor of New York and New Jersey (d. 1723)
- December 3 – Nathaniel Gould, English politician (d. 1728)
- December 5 – Robert Harley, 1st Earl of Oxford and Earl Mortimer, English statesman (d. 1724)
- December 8 – Kenneth Mackenzie, 4th Earl of Seaforth, Scottish Jacobite nobleman (d. 1701)
- December 18 – Christopher Polhem, Swedish scientist and inventor (d. 1751)
- date unknown – Rijkuo-Maja, Sámi noaidi (d. 1757)

1662

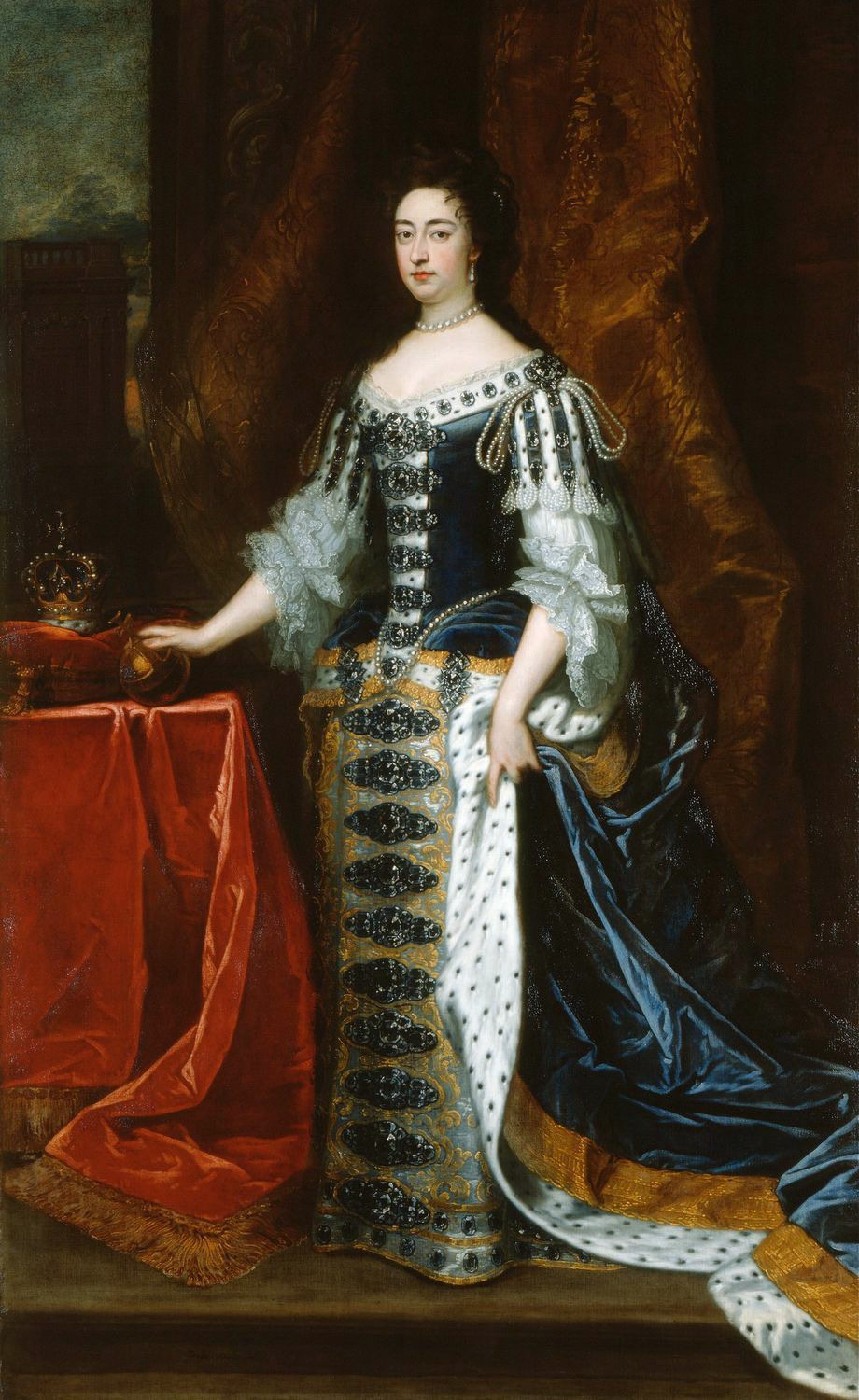
Mary II of England

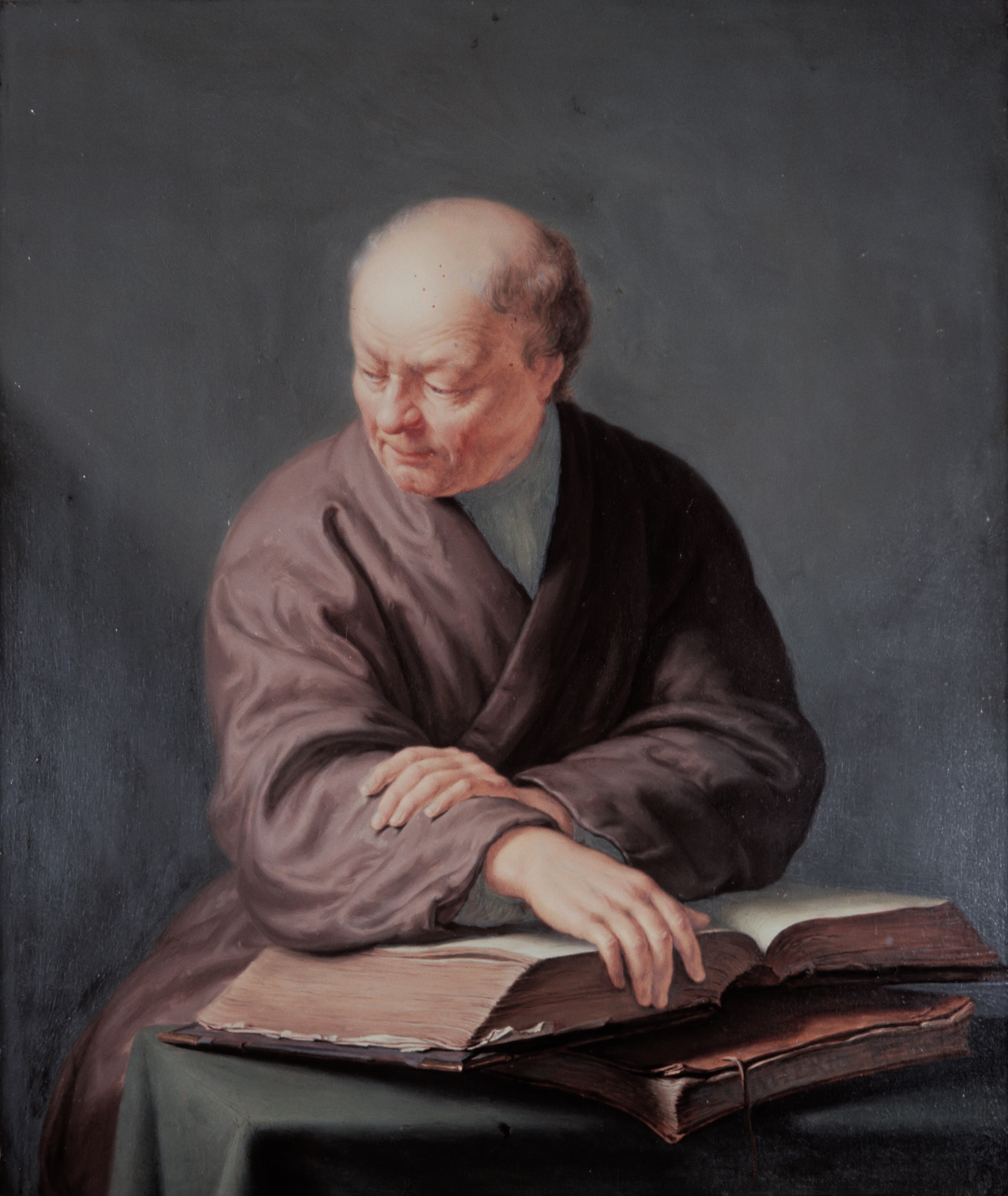
Willem van Mieris

- January 1 – Balaji Vishwanath, Peshwa of the Maratha Empire (d. 1720)
- January 4 – Jeanne Le Ber, religious recluse in New France (d. 1714)
- January 6 – Robert Sutton, 2nd Baron Lexinton, English diplomat (d. 1723)
- January 9 – John Holles, 1st Duke of Newcastle, England (d. 1711)
- January 12 – Samuel Shute, Governor of Massachusetts Bay and New Hampshire (d. 1742)
- January 17 – Françoise Pitel, French actor (d. 1721)
- January 25 – Luís da Cunha, Ambassador of Portugal (d. 1749)
- January 27 – Richard Bentley, English classical scholar (d. 1742)
- February 9 – Paolo de Matteis, Italian painter (d. 1728)
- February 15 – James Renwick, Scottish minister and Covenanter martyr (d. 1688)
- March 1 – Giovanni Carlo Aliberti, Italian painter (d. 1740)
- March 8 – Augustus William, Duke of Brunswick-Lüneburg (d. 1731)
- March 9 – Franz Anton von Sporck, German noble (d. 1738)
- March 10 – Francis Pierrepont, English politician (d. 1693)
- March 15 – Gabriel Álvarez de Toledo, Royal Librarian of King Felipe V of Spain (d. 1714)
- March 19 – Johann, Count of Leiningen-Dagsburg-Falkenburg (d. 1698)
- March 20 – Giuseppe Averani, Italian jurist and naturalist (d. 1738)
- March 29 – Tsarevna Feodosia Alekseyevna of Russia, daughter of Tsar Alexis of Russia (d. 1713)
- April 9
  - William Conolly, Irish politician (d. 1729)
  - Edward Hawarden, English Catholic theologian (d. 1735)
- April 11 – Countess Louise Sophie of Hanau-Lichtenberg (d. 1751)
- April 13 – Princess Eleonore Erdmuthe of Saxe-Eisenach, Electress of Saxony (d. 1696)
- April 26
  - Francisco Bances Candamo, Spanish playwright (d. 1704)
  - Marie Louise d'Orléans, queen consort of Spain (d. 1689)
- April 30 – Mary II of England, Scotland and Ireland, queen regnant (d. 1694)
- May 3 – Matthäus Daniel Pöppelmann, German architect (d. 1737)
- May 18 – George Smalridge, English Bishop of Bristol (d. 1719)
- June 3 – Willem van Mieris, Dutch painter (d. 1747)
- June 6 – Mannus Riedesel, German architect (d. 1726)
- June 7 – Celia Fiennes, English travel writer (d. 1741)
- June 11 – Tokugawa Ienobu, Japanese Edo shōgun (d. 1712)
- June 18 – Charles FitzRoy, 2nd Duke of Cleveland, illegitimate son of Charles II of England, courtier (d. 1730)
- July 1
  - Béatrice Hiéronyme de Lorraine, Abbess of Remiremont (d. 1738)
  - John Dolben, English politician (d. 1710)
- July 11 – Maximilian II Emanuel, Elector of Bavaria (d. 1726)
- July 20 – Andrea Brustolon, Italian artist (d. 1732)
- August 3 – Countess Sophie Henriette of Waldeck, Duchess of Saxe-Hildburghausen (d. 1702)
- August 5 – James Anderson, Scottish historian (d. 1728)
- August 10 – Charles Boit, Swedish enameller, miniature painter (d. 1727)
- August 13 – Charles Seymour, 6th Duke of Somerset, English politician (d. 1748)
- August 25 – John Leverett the Younger, Massachusetts colonial judge; president of Harvard (d. 1724)
- August 28 – Maria Aurora von Königsmarck, Swedish noblewoman of Brandenburg extraction (d. 1728)
- August 29 – Sebastiano Mocenigo, Doge of Venice (d. 1732)
- September 1 – Louis de Carrières, French priest and Bible commentator (d. 1717)
- September 19 – Jean-Paul Bignon, French priest and man of letters (d. 1743)
- October 3 – Alessandro, Marquis de Maffei, Italian Lieutenant General of Infantry in Bavarian service (d. 1730)
- October 6 – William Walsh, English poet, correspondent and British Member of Parliament (d. 1708)
- October 14 – William Fairfield, Massachusetts Speaker of the House of Deputies (d. 1742)
- October 17 – Arthur Rawdon, English Member of Parliament (d. 1695)
- October 18 – Matthew Henry, English Bible commentator, Presbyterian minister (d. 1714)
- October 19 – William Ernest, Duke of Saxe-Weimar (d. 1728)
- November 2 – Johan Cronman, Swedish general (d. 1737)
- November 7 – Pierre Fatio, Swiss politician (d. 1707)
- November 11
  - John Chesshyre, English lawyer (d. 1738)
  - Alexander Pendarves, English politician (d. 1726)
- November 12 – Francesco Barberini, Italian Catholic cardinal (d. 1738)
- November 19 – John Campbell, 2nd Earl of Breadalbane and Holland, Scottish politician (d. 1752)
- November 29 – Heinrich X, Count of Reuss-Ebersdorf (d. 1711)
- November 30 – Luis Antonio Belluga y Moncada, Spanish Catholic cardinal (d. 1743)
- December 13 – Francesco Bianchini, Italian philosopher and scientist (d. 1729)
- December 17 – Samuel Wesley, English poet, father of the Wesley brothers (d. 1735)
- December 18 – James Douglas, 2nd Duke of Queensberry, Scottish politician (d. 1711)
- December 24 – Adam Zrinski, Croatian count and military officer (d. 1691)

1663

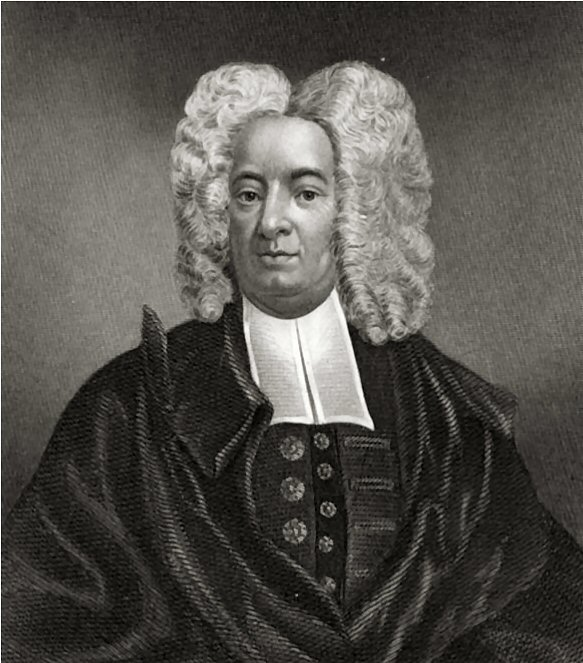
Cotton Mather

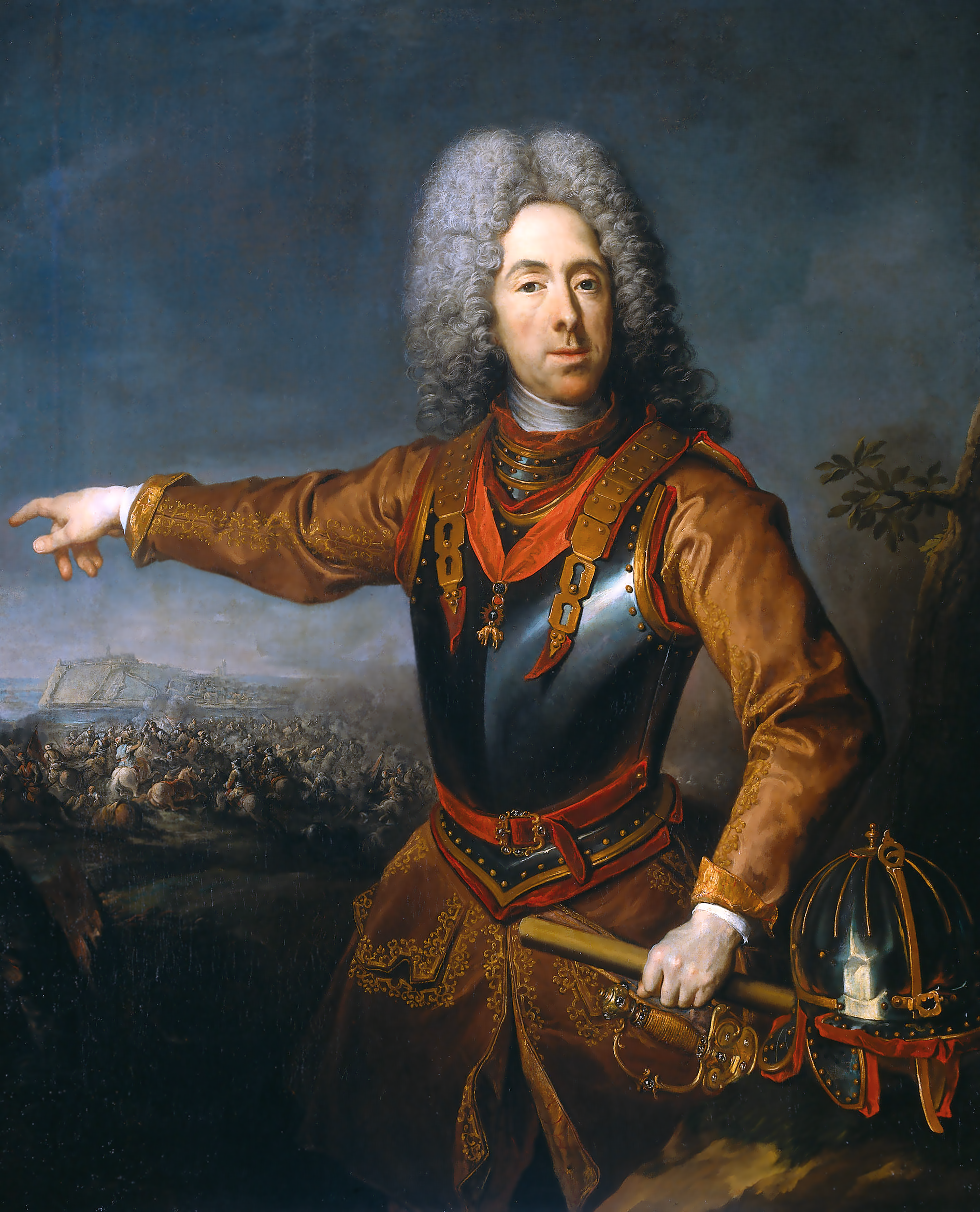
Prince Eugene of Savoy

- January 13 – Henry Paget, 1st Earl of Uxbridge, British politician (d. 1743)
- January 19 – Nicholas Trott, colonial magistrate, South Carolina Chief Justice (d. 1740)
- January 20 – Luca Carlevarijs, Italian painter (d. 1730)
- January 26 – Francis Barrell, English politician (d. 1724)
- January 27 – George Byng, 1st Viscount Torrington, English Royal Navy admiral (d. 1733)
- February 1 – Ignacia del Espíritu Santo, Filipino religious sister (d. 1748)
- February 4 – Edward Lee, 1st Earl of Lichfield, English peer (d. 1716)
- February 12 – Cotton Mather, American theologian (d. 1728)
- February 22 – Louis Bossuet, French parlementaire (d. 1742)
- February 25 – Pierre Antoine Motteux, French-born English dramatist (d. 1718)
- March 3 – Nicolas Siret, French composer, organist and harpsichordist (d. 1754)
- March 6 – Francis Atterbury, British bishop (d. 1732)
- March 7 – Tomaso Antonio Vitali, Italian composer and violinist (d. 1745)
- March 16 – Jean-Baptiste Matho, French composer (d. 1743)
- March 18 – Johann Martin Steindorff, German composer (d. 1744)
- March 22 – August Hermann Francke, German Lutheran clergyman, philanthropist, Biblical scholar (d. 1727)
- March 25 – Félix Le Pelletier de La Houssaye (d. 1723)
- March 27 – Johann Andreas Eisenbarth, German surgeon (d. 1727)
- March 28 – Louis Crato, Count of Nassau-Saarbrücken (d. 1713)
- March 29 – Harry Mordaunt, British politician (d. 1720)
- April 7 – Filippo II Colonna, Italian noble (d. 1714)
- April 10 – Francisco de Berganza, Italian Benedictine monk (d. 1738)
- April 14 – August David zu Sayn-Wittgenstein-Hohenstein, Prussian politician (d. 1735)
- April 16 – Alexander Sigismund von der Pfalz-Neuburg, German Catholic bishop (d. 1737)
- May 1 – Giacomo Parolini, Italian painter (d. 1733)
- May 2 – Joseph de Gallifet, French Jesuit priest (d. 1749)
- May 8 – Lord James Murray, Scottish Member of Parliament (d. 1719)
- May 17
  - Rosine Elisabeth Menthe, morganatic wife of Duke Rudolf August of Brunswick-Wolfenbüttel (d. 1701)
  - Sir William Glynne, 2nd Baronet, English politician (d. 1721)
- May 20 – William Bradford, English-born printer in North America (d. 1752)
- May 25 – Johann Dientzenhofer, German architect (d. 1726)
- May 28 – António Manoel de Vilhena, Portuguese Grand Master of the Order of Saint John (d. 1736)
- June 2 – Anne-Marguerite Petit du Noyer, French journalist (d. 1719)
- June 8 – Sir William Lowther, 1st Baronet, of Swillington, British politician (d. 1729)
- June 24 – Jean Baptiste Massillon, French Catholic bishop, famous preacher (d. 1742)
- July 1 – Franz Xaver Murschhauser, German composer and theorist (d. 1738)
- July 11 – James Stuart, Duke of Cambridge, British prince (d. 1667)
- July 15 – Sir John Cropley, 2nd Baronet, English politician (d. 1713)
- July 26 – Peter Hohmann, Edler of Hohenthal, Leipzig merchant and town councillor, raised to nobility (d. 1732)
- August 9 – Ferdinando de' Medici, Grand Prince of Tuscany (d. 1713)
- August 18 – Catherine Repond, alleged Swiss witch (d. 1731)
- August 24 – Kiliaen Van Rensselaer, fifth patroon in New Netherland (d. 1719)
- August 31 – Guillaume Amontons, French scientific instrument inventor and physicist (d. 1705)
- September 1 – Jean Boivin the Younger, French writer (d. 1726)
- September 16 – Johann Josua Mosengel, German organ builder (d. 1731)
- September 20
  - Pirro Albergati, Italian composer (d. 1735)
  - Frederick William, Prince of Hohenzollern-Hechingen (d. 1735)
  - Louis-François Duplessis de Mornay, Catholic bishop of Quebec (d. 1741)
- September 25 – Johann Nikolaus Hanff, German composer and organist (d. 1711)
- September 28 – Henry FitzRoy, 1st Duke of Grafton (d. 1690)
- October 3 – Johann Christoph Wichmannshausen, German philosopher (d. 1727)
- October 9
  - Francis Xavier Schmalzgrueber, German canon law jurist (d. 1735)
  - Giovanni Mario Crescimbeni, Italian critic and poet (d. 1728)
- October 15 – Fitton Gerard, 3rd Earl of Macclesfield, English politician, earl (d. 1702)
- October 17 – Diego de Astorga y Céspedes, Spanish Catholic cardinal (d. 1734)
- October 18 – Prince Eugene of Savoy, Austrian field marshal (d. 1736)
- October 23 – Margravine Eleonore Juliane of Brandenburg-Ansbach, duchess by marriage of Württemberg-Winnental (d. 1724)
- October 24 – Stephen Delancey, major colonial New York figure (d. 1741)
- November 13 – Árni Magnússon, Icelandic scholar and manuscript collector (d. 1730)
- November 14 – Friedrich Wilhelm Zachow, German composer (d. 1712)
- November 17 – Marie Christine de Pardaillan de Gondrin, eldest legitimate child of Françoise-Athénaïs (d. 1675)
- November 25 – Jean-Frédéric Osterwald, Swiss Protestant pastor (d. 1747)
- November 29 – Sir Thomas Crosse, 1st Baronet, British aristocrat, politician (d. 1738)
- November 30 – Andrea Adami da Bolsena, Italian castrato (d. 1742)
- December 8 – Nathan Gold, deputy colonial governor of Connecticut (d. 1723)
- December 20 – Thomas Wilson, Bishop of Sodor and Man (d. 1755)
- December 24 – Ippolita Ludovisi, Princess of Piombino (1701 until her death) (d. 1733)
- December 27 – Johann Melchior Roos, German painter (d. 1731)
- December 31 – Carl Wilhelm Welser von Neunhof, German merchant, politician (d. 1711)
- Date unknown –
  - William King, English poet (d. 1712)
  - Delarivier Manley, English author (d. 1724)
  - Antonio Zucchelli, Italian Franciscan capuchin friar, explorer and missionary (d. 1716)

1664

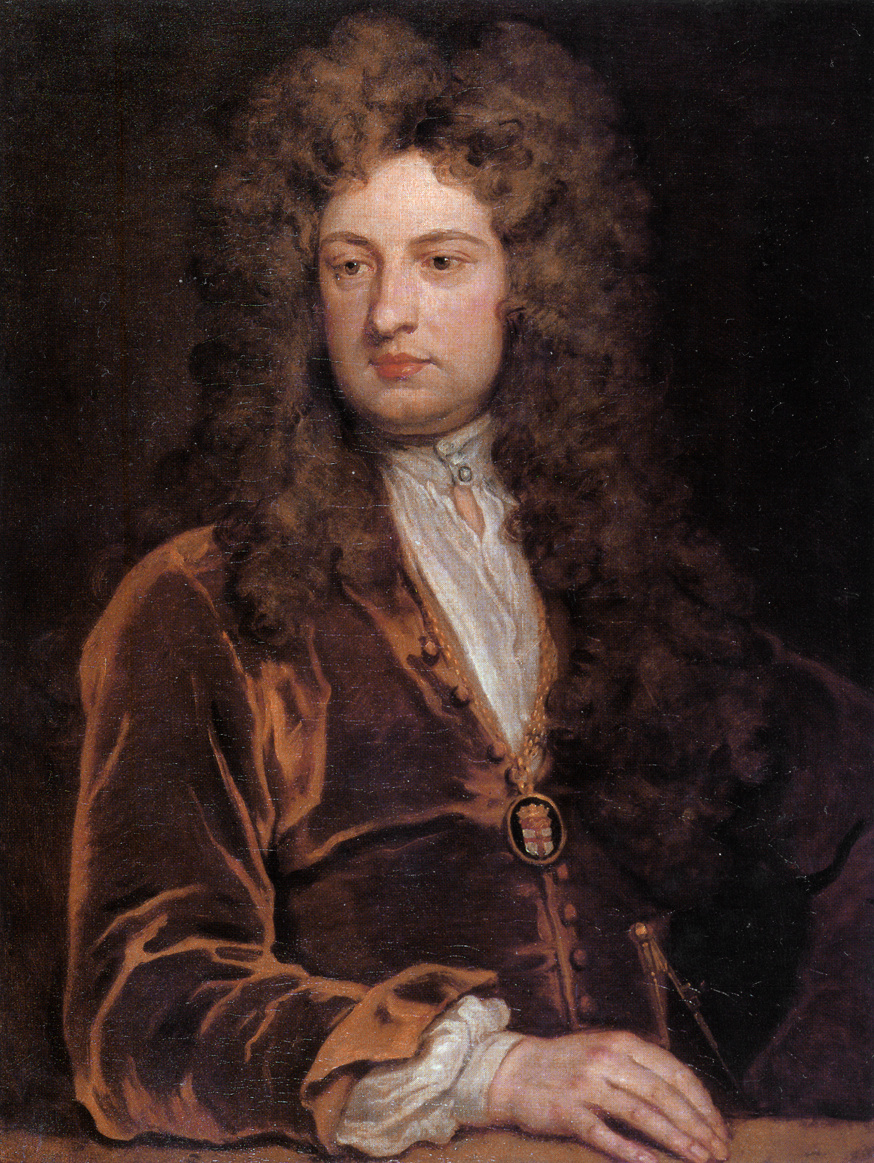
John Vanbrugh

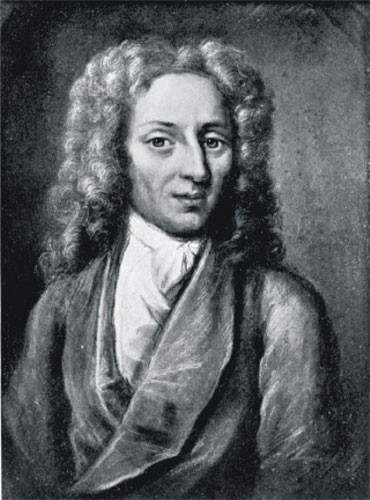
Nicolas Fatio de Duillier

- January 1 – Alvise Pisani, 114th Doge of Venice (d. 1741)
- January 4 – Lars Roberg, Swedish physician (d. 1742)
- January 14
  - Johann Jakob Schudt, German theologian (d. 1722)
  - Simon van Slingelandt, Grand Pensionary of Holland (d. 1736)
- January 15 – Jean Meslier, French Catholic priest, later discovered to have promoted atheism (d. 1729)
- January 17 – Antonio Salvi, Italian poet (d. 1724)
- January 20 – Giovanni Vincenzo Gravina, Italian writer and jurist (d. 1718)
- January 24 – John Vanbrugh, English architect and dramatist (d. 1726)
- February 6 – Mustafa II, Ottoman Sultan (d. 1703)
- February 8 – William Seymour, British politician (d. 1728)
- February 13 – Teodor Andrzej Potocki, Polish noble (d. 1738)
- February 23 – Georg Dietrich Leyding, German composer and organist (d. 1710)
- February 24 (baptized) – Thomas Newcomen, English inventor (d. 1729)
- February 26 – Nicolas Fatio de Duillier, Swiss mathematician (d. 1753)
- March 4 – Juan de Esteyneffer, Moravian German lay Jesuit missionary sent to the New World (d. 1716)
- March 11 – Jørgen Otto Brockenhuus, Dano-Norwegian officer (d. 1728)
- March 12 – Moritz Wilhelm, Duke of Saxe-Zeitz (d. 1718)
- March 14 – Silvio Stampiglia, Italian poet and opera librettist (d. 1725)
- March 17 – Georg Österreich, German composer and music collector (d. 1735)
- March 20 – Johann Homann, German cartographer (d. 1724)
- April 5 – Élisabeth Thérèse de Lorraine, French noblewoman, Princess of Epinoy by marriage (d. 1748)
- April 6
  - Arvid Horn, Swedish politician (d. 1742)
  - Gustaf Cronhielm, Swedish politician (d. 1737)
- April 11 – Pierce Lewis, Welsh cleric who helped to "correct" the 1690 edition of the Welsh Bible (d. 1699)
- April 14 – Ulrik Adolf Holstein, Danish nobleman and statesman (d. 1737)
- April 30 – François Louis, Prince of Conti, French general (d. 1709)
- May 6 – Bhai Bachittar Singh, Indian Sikh martyr (d. 1705)
- May 10 – Tørres Christensen, Norwegian merchant (d. 1721)
- May 20 – Andreas Schlüter, German architect and sculptor (d. 1714)
- May 30 – Giulio Alberoni, Italian cardinal and statesman (d. 1754)
- June 3 – Rachel Ruysch, painter from the Northern Netherlands (d. 1750)
- June 7
  - Edward Harley, English politician (d. 1735)
  - Henry Dawnay, 2nd Viscount Downe, Irish peer (d. 1741)
- June 22 – Johann Ernst III, Duke of Saxe-Weimar (d. 1707)
- June 24 – François Pourfour du Petit, French anatomist, ophthalmologist and surgeon (d. 1741)
- June 28 – Nicolas Bernier, French composer (d. 1734)
- July 3 – James Stanley, 10th Earl of Derby, English politician (d. 1736)
- July 11 – James Ogilvy, 4th Earl of Findlater (d. 1730)
- July 16 – Philippe Charles, Duke of Valois (d. 1666)
- July 18 – Count Palatine Francis Louis of Neuburg, Hochmeister of the Teutonic Order (d. 1732)
- July 21 – Matthew Prior, English poet and diplomat (d. 1721)
- August 2 – Philip Reinhard, Count of Hanau-Münzenberg (d. 1712)
- August 4 – Louis Lully, French composer (d. 1734)
- August 12 – Magnus Stenbock, Swedish noble (d. 1717)
- August 20 – János Pálffy, Hungarian field marshal, Palatine (d. 1751)
- August 24
  - Christen Thomesen Sehested, Danish admiral (d. 1736)
  - Willem Adriaan van der Stel, Dutch colonial administrator (d. 1733)
- September 5
  - Charlotte Lee, Countess of Lichfield, illegitimate daughter of King Charles II of England (d. 1718)
  - Vincenzo Ludovico Gotti, Italian Catholic cardinal (d. 1742)
  - Louis Antoine de Pardaillan de Gondrin, French duke (d. 1736)
- September 7
  - Johann Georg von Eckhart, German historian (d. 1730)
  - Thomas Morgan, English politician (d. 1700)
- September 9 – Johann Christoph Pez, German composer (d. 1716)
- September 14 – John Blackadder, Scottish soldier (d. 1729)
- September 18 – Anton Maria Maragliano, Italian artist (d. 1739)
- October 3 – Giuseppe Alberti, Italian painter (d. 1716)
- October 12 – Praskovia Saltykova, Russian tsarina (d. 1723)
- October 16 – Abraham Alewijn, Dutch playwright (d. 1721)
- October 18 – George Compton, 4th Earl of Northampton (d. 1727)
- October 27 – Thomas Johnson, English politician (d. 1728)
- October 31 – Sir Wilfrid Lawson, 2nd Baronet, of Isell, English politician (d. 1704)
- November 9
  - Johann Speth, German composer (d. 1719)
  - Henry Wharton, English writer (d. 1695)
- November 12 – Marie-Jeanne L'Héritier, French writer (d. 1734)
- November 16 – Louise Marie Thérèse, French Benedictine nun (d. 1732)
- November 18 – Charles of Mecklenburg-Güstrow, Duke of Mecklenburg (d. 1688)
- November 24 – Margherita Maria Farnese, Italian noblewoman (d. 1718)
- December 10 – John Williams, American clergy (d. 1729)
- December 13 – Countess Charlotte Johanna of Waldeck-Wildungen, German noblewoman (d. 1699)
- December 15 – Azim-ush-Shan, Mughal prince (d. 1712)
- December 17 – Henry Bayntun, English politician (d. 1691)
- December 26 – Johann Melchior Dinglinger, German goldsmith (d. 1731)
- date unknown – Johanna Dorothea Lindenaer, Dutch writer and agent (d. 1737)
  - Catherine Jérémie, French-Canadian botanist (d. 1744)
  - Maria Guyomar de Pinha, Siamese cook (d. 1728)

1665

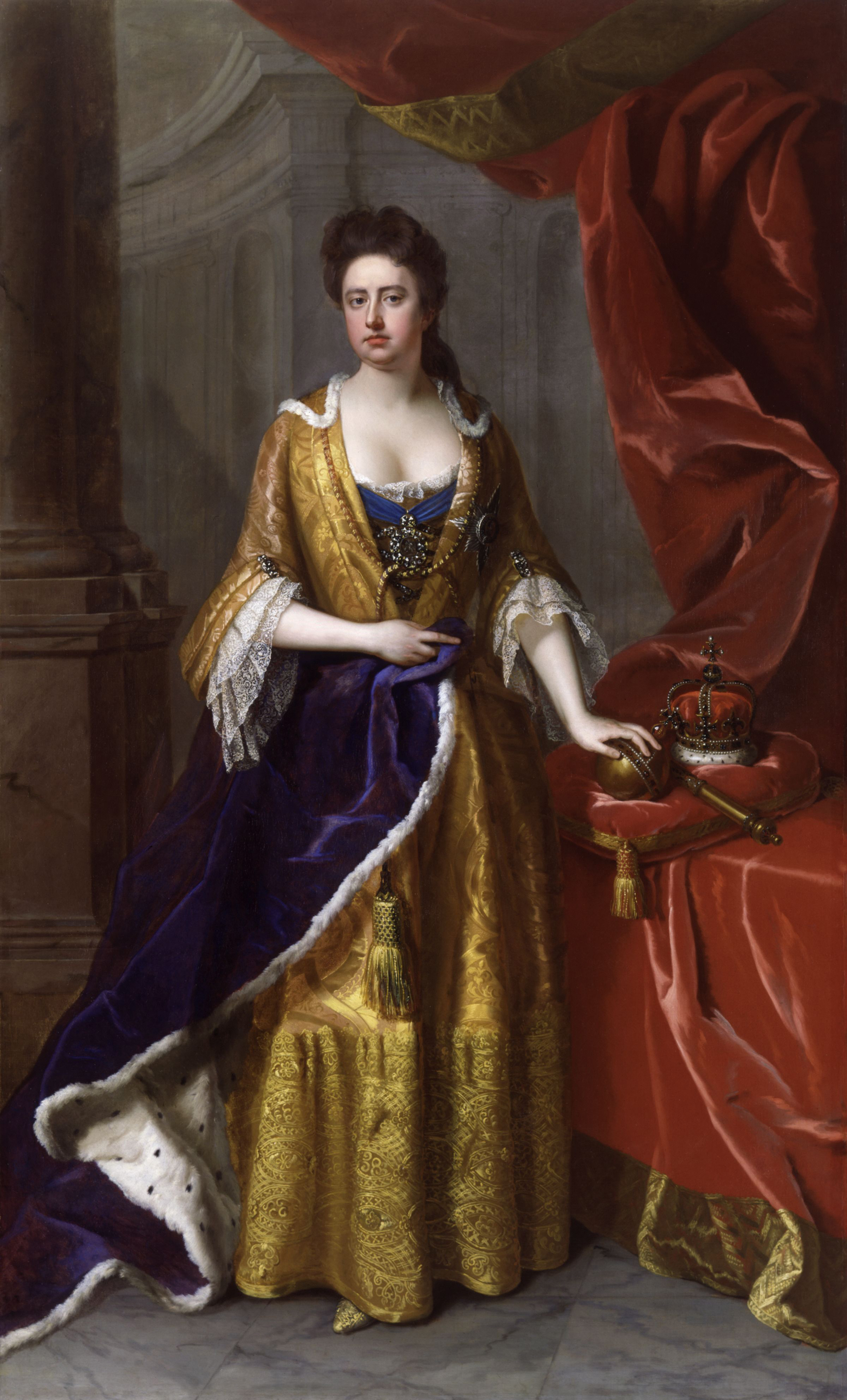
Anne, Queen of Great Britain

- February 6 – Anne, Queen of Great Britain (d. 1714)
- February 12 – Rudolf Jakob Camerarius, German botanist and physician (d. 1721)
- March 4 – Philip Christoph von Königsmarck, Swedish soldier (d. 1694)
- March 17 – Élisabeth Jacquet de La Guerre, French harpsichordist and composer (d. 1729)
- April 19 – Jacques Lelong, French bibliographer (d. 1721)
- April 29 – James Butler, 2nd Duke of Ormonde, Irish statesman and soldier (d. 1745)
- June 4 – Zacharie Robutel de La Noue, Canadian soldier (d. 1733)
- July 2 – Samuel Penhallow, English-born American colonist, historian (d. 1726)
- August 21 – Giacomo F. Maraldi, French-Italian astronomer (d. 1729)
- August 27 – John Hervey, 1st Earl of Bristol, English politician (d. 1751)
- December 25 – Lady Grizel Baillie, Scottish songwriter (d. 1746)
- December 28 – George FitzRoy, 1st Duke of Northumberland, English general (d. 1716)
- date unknown – Ingeborg i Mjärhult, Swedish soothsayer (d. 1749)

1666

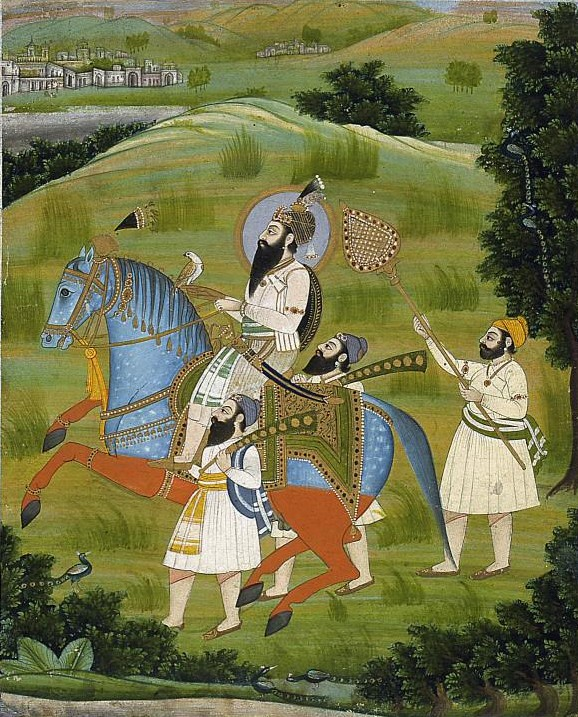
Guru Gobind Singh

- February 1 – Marie Thérèse de Bourbon, Princess of Conti and titular queen of Poland (d. 1732)
- February 9 – George Hamilton, 1st Earl of Orkney, British soldier (d. 1737)
- March 15 – George Bähr, German architect (d. 1738)
- May 14 – Victor Amadeus II of Sardinia (d. 1732)
- July 10 – John Ernest Grabe, German-born Anglican theologian (d. 1711)
- July 23 – Thomas Parker, 1st Earl of Macclesfield (d. 1732)
- August 4 – Maria Sophia of Neuburg, Queen consort of Portugal (d. 1699)
- August 13 – William Wotton, English scholar (d. 1727)
- September 5 – Gottfried Arnold, German church historian (d. 1714)
- September 6 – Tsar Ivan V of Russia (d. 1696)
- November 12 – Mary Astell, English writer (d. 1731)
- December 22 – Guru Gobind Singh, 10th Guru of Sikhism, social reformist, poet, and revolutionary (d. 1708)
- date unknown –
  - Arthur Chichester, 3rd Earl of Donegall (d. 1706)
  - Mary Pix, English author (d. 1709)

1667

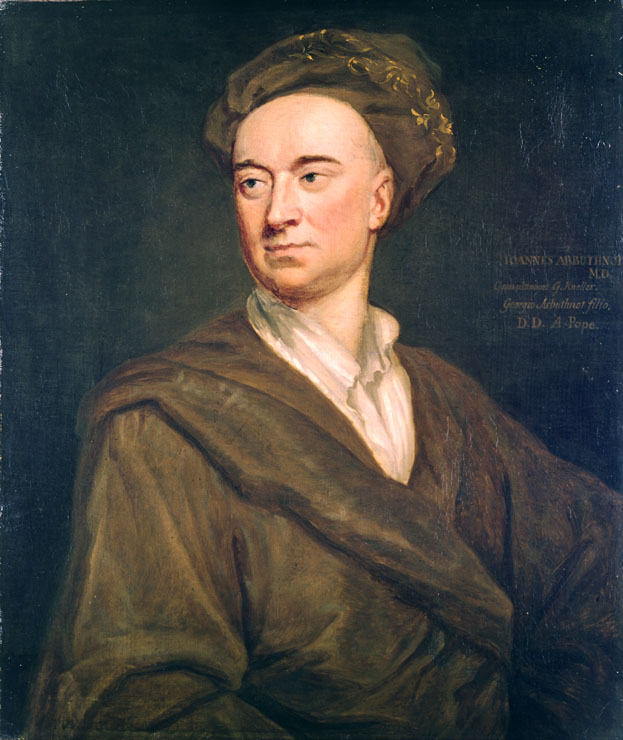
John Arbuthnot

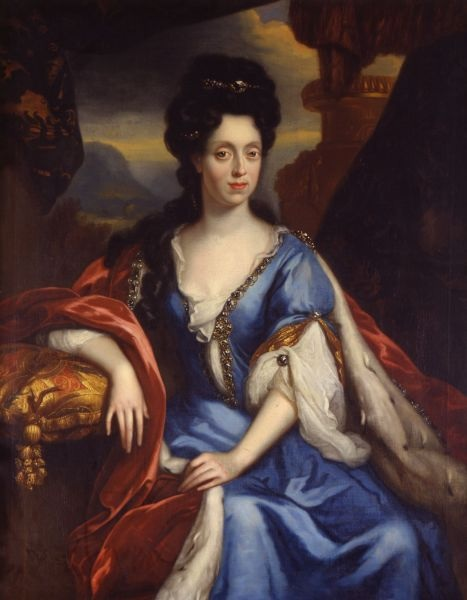
Anna Maria Luisa de' Medici

- April 29 – John Arbuthnot, English physician and writer (d. 1735)
- May 26 – Abraham de Moivre, French mathematician (d. 1754)
- June 18 – Ivan Trubetskoy, Russian field marshal (d. 1750)
- July 2 – Pietro Ottoboni, Italian cardinal (d. 1740)
- July 27 – Johann Bernoulli, Swiss mathematician (d. 1748)
- August 11 – Anna Maria Luisa de' Medici, last of the Medicis of Italy (d. 1743)
- September 5 – Giovanni Girolamo Saccheri, Italian mathematician (d. 1733)
- September 28 – Asano Naganori, Japanese warlord (d. 1701)
- November 2 – James Sobieski, Crown Prince of Poland (d. 1737)
- November 5 – Christoph Ludwig Agricola, German painter (d. 1719)
- November 30 – Jonathan Swift, Irish writer (d. 1745)
- December 9 – William Whiston, English mathematician (d. 1752)
- December 25 – Ehrengard Melusine von der Schulenburg, Duchess of Kendal and Munster (d. 1743)
- date unknown
  - Yaoya Oshichi, Japanese girl burned at the stake for arson (d. 1683)
  - Anna Colbjørnsdatter, Norwegian heroine (d. 1736)
  - Beinta Broberg, notorious Faroese vicar's wife (d. 1752)
  - Susanna Verbruggen, English actress (d. 1703)
- probable –
  - Antonio Lotti, Italian composer (d. 1740)
  - Susanna Centlivre, English actress and playwright (d. 1723)

1668

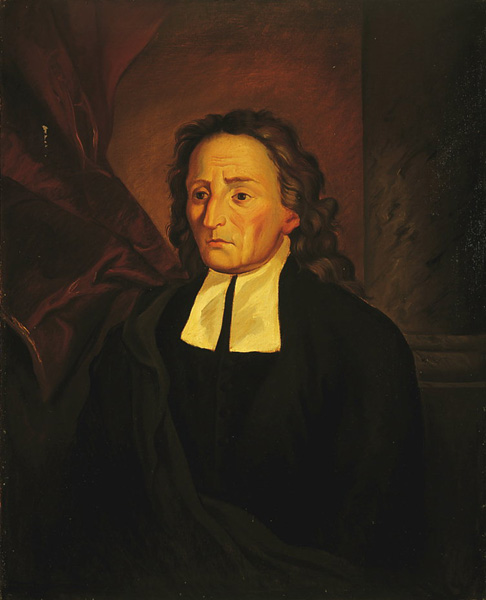
Giambattista Vico

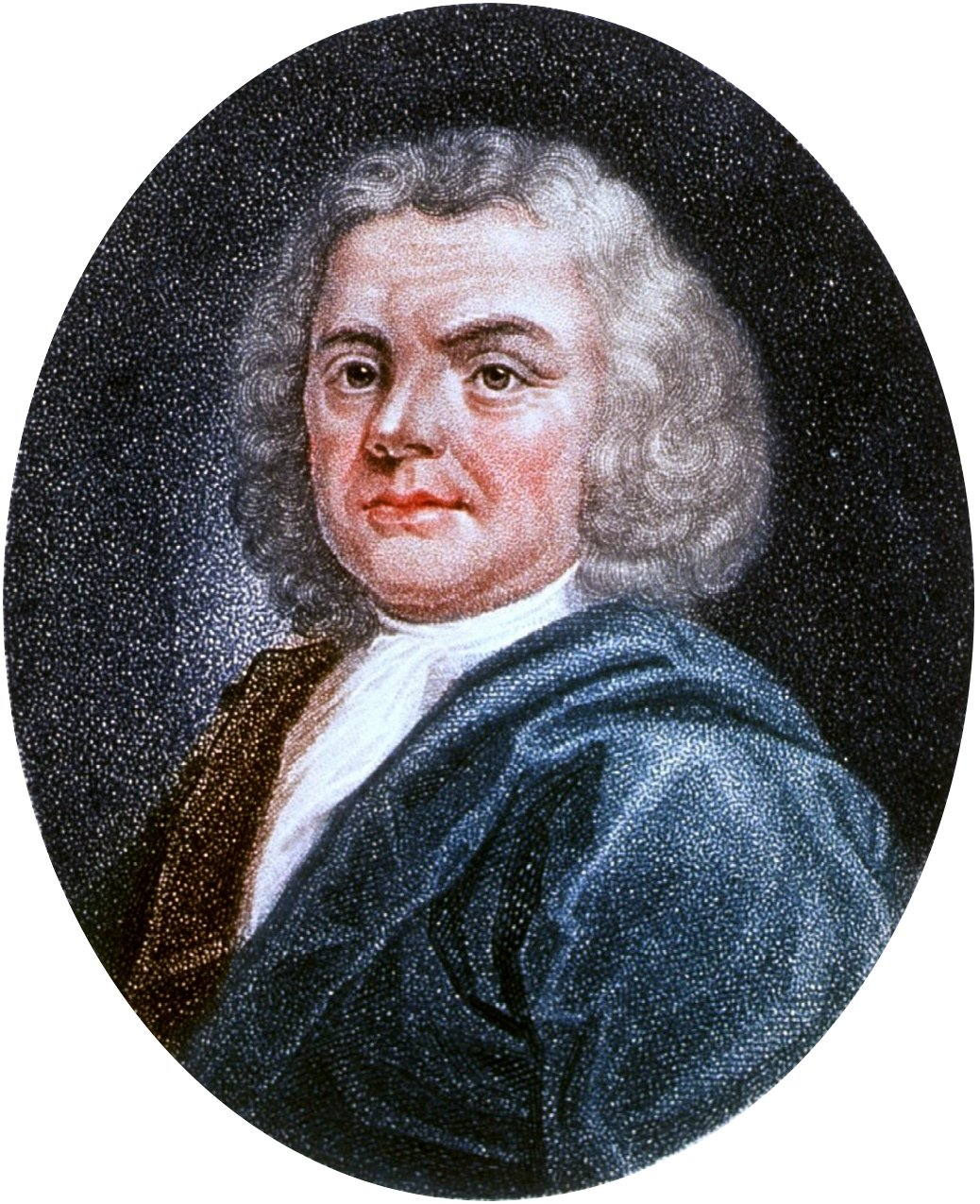
Herman Boerhaave

- May 8 – Alain-René Lesage, French writer (d. 1747)
- June 23 – Giambattista Vico, Italian philosopher and historian (d. 1744)
- July 21 – Frederick Heinrich of Saxe-Zeitz-Pegau-Neustadt (d. 1713)
- September 8 – Giorgio Baglivi, Armenian doctor and writer (d. 1707)
- October 18 – John George IV, Elector of Saxony (d. 1694)
- October 30 – Sophia Charlotte of Hanover, sister of King George I of Great Britain (d. 1705)
- November 10
  - Louis III, Prince of Condé (d. 1710)
  - François Couperin, French composer (d. 1733)
- November 11 – Johann Albert Fabricius, German scholar (d. 1736)
- November 27 – Henri François d'Aguesseau, Chancellor of France (d. 1751)
- November 30 – William August, Duke of Saxe-Eisenach (d. 1671)
- December 11 – Apostolo Zeno, Italian poet and journalist (d. 1750)
- December 31 – Herman Boerhaave, Dutch humanist and physician (d. 1738)
- date unknown – Stokkseyrar-Dísa, Icelandic Galdrmistress (d. 1728)

1669

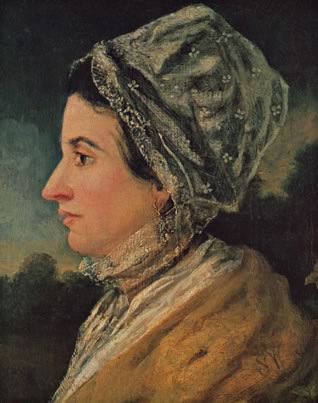
Susanna Wesley

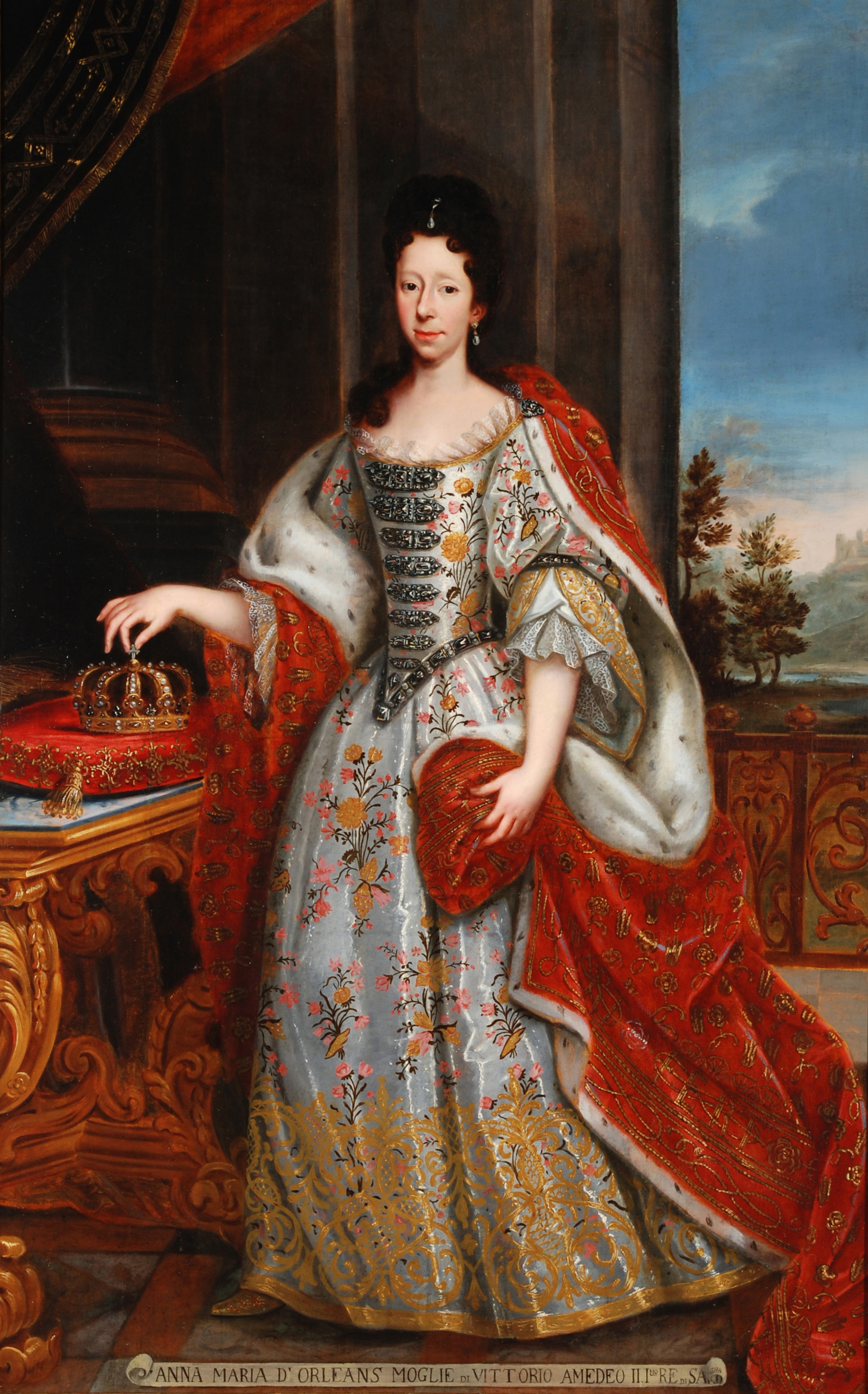
Anne Marie d'Orléans

- January 20 – Susanna Wesley, mother of the John and Charles Wesley, known as mother of Methodism (d. 1742)
- April 3 – Jean-Baptiste Forqueray, French musician (d. 1722)
- May 24 – Emerentia von Düben, Swedish royal favorite (d. 1743)
- May 26 – Sébastien Vaillant, French botanist (d. 1722)
- July 30 – Eudoxia Lopukhina, first wife of Peter I of Russia (d. 1731)
- August 27 – Anne Marie d'Orléans, Queen of Sicily and Sardinia (d. 1728)
- August 29 – John Anstis, English herald (d. 1744)
- October 19 – Count Wirich Philipp von Daun, Austrian military leader (d. 1741)
- December 16 – Arnold Boonen, Dutch portrait painter (d. 1729)
- date unknown
  - Alessio Erardi, Maltese painter (d. 1727)
  - Jiang Tingxi, Chinese painter (d. 1732)
  - Elżbieta Sieniawska, politically influential Polish magnate (d. 1729)
- probable – Peter King, 1st Baron King, Lord Chancellor of England (d. 1734)

== Deaths ==
1660

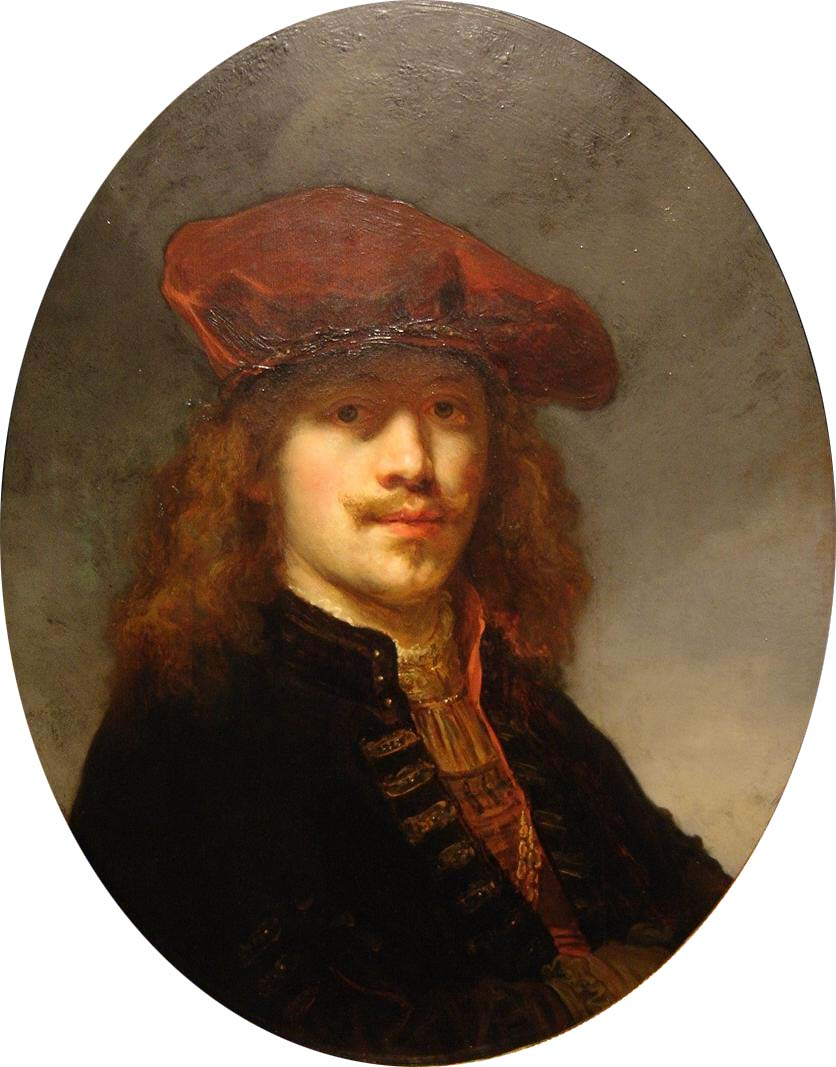
Govert Flinck

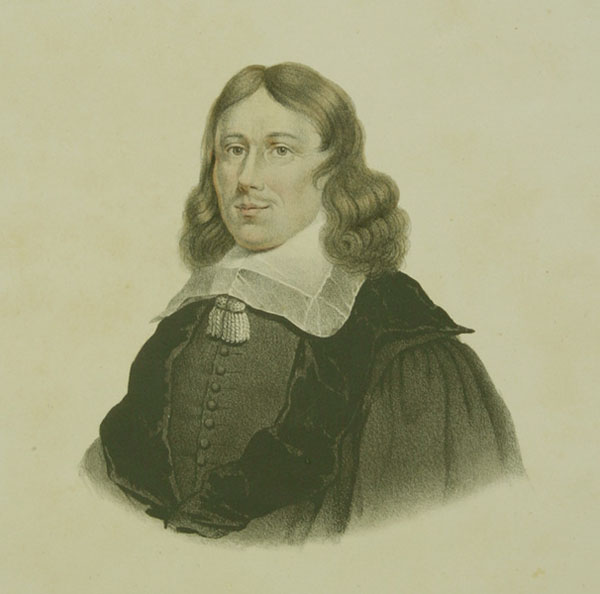
Frans van Schooten

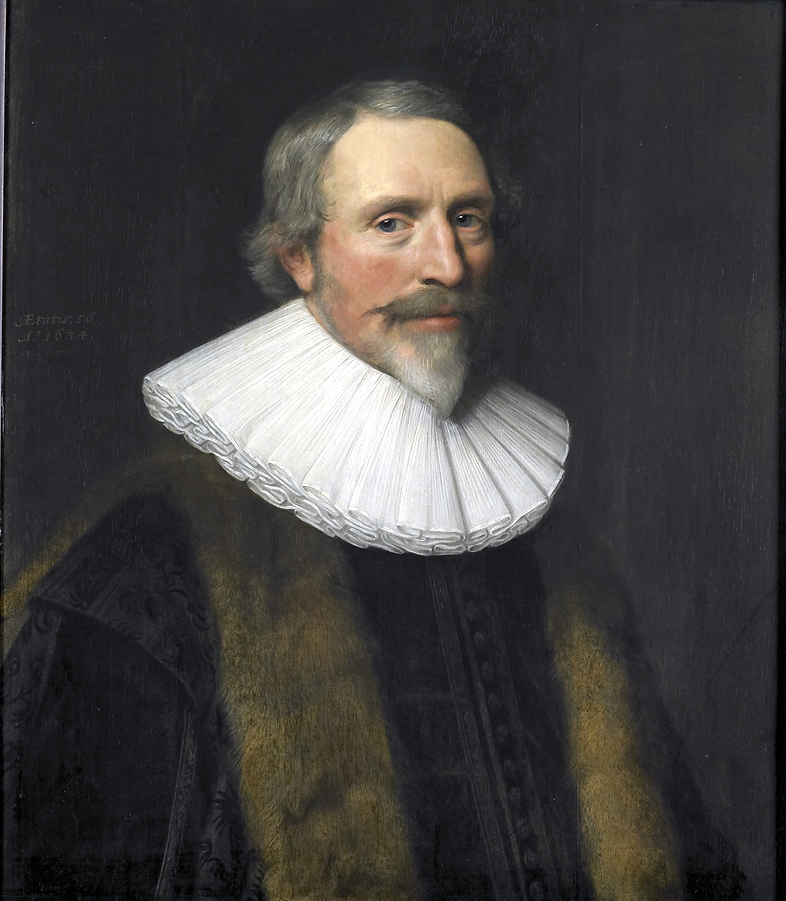
Jacob Cats

- January 16 – Peter Wtewael, Dutch painter (b. 1596)
- February 2
  - Govert Flinck, Dutch painter (b. 1615)
  - Gaston, Duke of Orléans, French politician (b. 1608)
- February 6 – Martin de Redin, Spanish 58th Grandmaster of the Knights Hospitaller (b. 1579)
- February 10 – Judith Leyster, Dutch painter (b. 1609)
- February 13 – King Charles X Gustav of Sweden (b. 1622)
- March – Philip Skippon, English soldier (b. c. 1600)
- March 5 – Felice Ficherelli, Italian painter (b. 1605)
- March 15 – Louise de Marillac, French co-founder of the Daughters of Charity (b. 1591)
- April 4 – Enno Louis, Prince of East Frisia, Frisian prince (b. 1632)
- April 6
  - Giovanni Battista Hodierna, Italian astronomer (b. 1597)
  - Michelangelo Cerquozzi, Italian painter (b. 1602)
- April 25 – Henry Hammond, English churchman (b. 1605)
- April 26 – Elizabeth Charlotte of the Palatinate, wife of George William (b. 1597)
- April 30 – Petrus Scriverius, Dutch writer (b. 1576)
- May 21 – Adam Dollard des Ormeaux, iconic figure in the history of New France (b. 1635)
- May 29
  - Frans van Schooten, Dutch mathematician (b. 1615)
  - George FitzGerald, 16th Earl of Kildare, Irish earl (b. 1612)
- June 1 – Mary Dyer, English Quaker (hanged) (b. c. 1611)
- June 2 – Annet de Clermont-Gessant, French 59th Grandmaster of the Knights Hospitaller (b. 1587)
- June 5 –Anne Holck, Danish noble and war heroine (b. 1602)
- June 7 – George II Rákóczi, Transylvanian ruler (b. 1621)
- June 8 – Lorentz Eichstadt, German mathematician and astronomer (b. 1596)
- June 13 – Lady Katherine Ferrers, English aristocrat and heiress (b. 1634)
- June 30 – William Oughtred, English mathematician (b. 1575)
- July 7 – Anna of Pomerania, Duchess-Consort of Croy and Havré (b. 1590)
- August 2 – Agostino Mitelli, Italian painter (b. 1609)
- August 6 – Diego Velázquez, Spanish painter (b. 1599)
- August 10 – Esmé Stewart, 2nd Duke of Richmond (b. 1649)
- August 14
  - Maria Gonzaga, Duchess of Montferrat, Italian noble (b. 1609)
  - William Lytton, Member of Parliament (b. 1586)
- August 31 – Johann Freinsheim, German classical scholar, critic (b. 1608)
- September 12 – Jacob Cats, Dutch poet, jurist and politician (b. 1577)
- September 13 – Henry Stuart, Duke of Gloucester, son of Charles I (b. 1640)
- September 15 – John Casimir, Prince of Anhalt-Dessau (b. 1596)
- September 27 – Vincent de Paul, French saint (b. 1580)
- October 4 – Francesco Albani, Italian painter (b. 1578)
- October 6 – Paul Scarron, French writer (b. 1610)
- October 14 – Thomas Harrison, English soldier (b. 1616)
- October 17 – Adrian Scrope, English regicide (b. 1601)
- November 5
  - Lucy Hay, Countess of Carlisle, English socialite (b. 1599)
  - Alexandre de Rhodes, French Jesuit missionary (b. 1591)
- November 27 – John Finch, 1st Baron Finch, English judge (b. 1584)
- November 30 – Prince Francis Charles of Saxe-Lauenburg (b. 1591)
- December 1 – Pierre d'Hozier, French historian (b. 1592)
- December 22 – André Tacquet, Belgian mathematician (b. 1612)
- December 24 – Mary, Princess Royal and Princess of Orange (b. 1631)
- December 27 – Hervey Bagot, English politician (b. 1591)
- approximate – William Stone, Colonial governor of Maryland (b. c. 1603)

1661

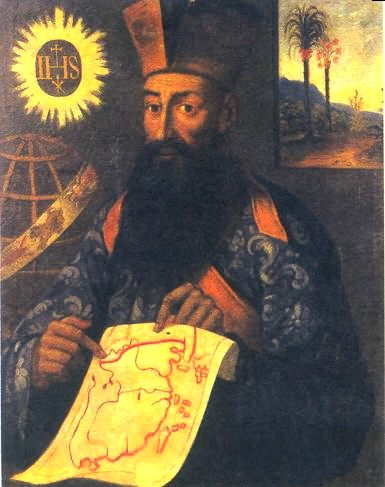
Martino Martini

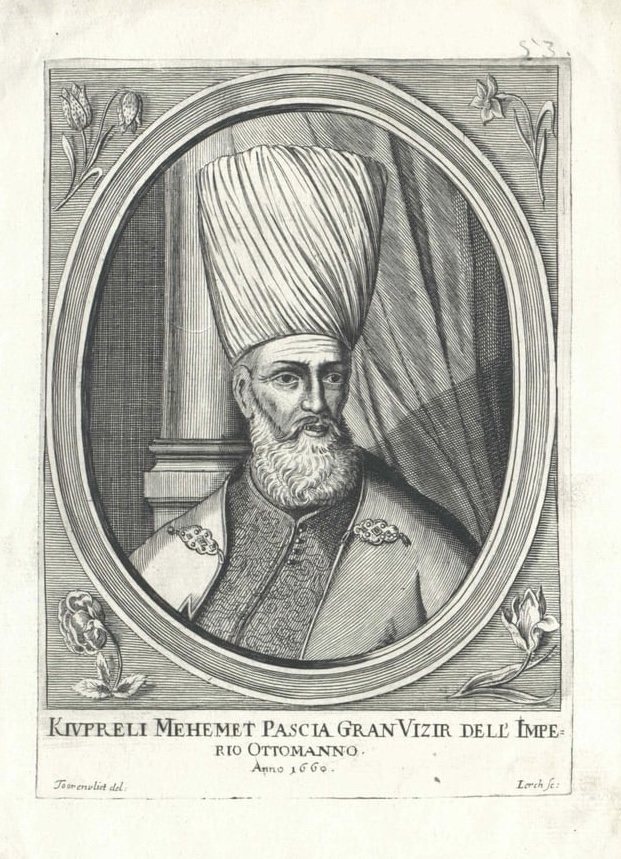
Köprülü Mehmed Pasha

- January 19 – Thomas Venner, English Fifth Monarchist (executed)
- January 25 – John Hele, English politician (b. 1626)
- January 29 – Bartolomeo Gennari, Italian painter (b. 1594)
- February 2 – Lucas Holstenius, German humanist (b. 1596)
- February 5 – Shunzhi Emperor of China (b. 1638)
- February 7 – Shah Shuja, second son of Shah Jahan and Mumtaz Mahal (b. 1616)
- March 1 – Richard Zouch, English jurist (b. 1590)
- March 9 – Cardinal Mazarin, French cardinal and statesman (b. 1602)
- March 23 – Pieter de Molijn, Dutch painter (b. 1595)
- April 4 – Alexander Leslie, 1st Earl of Leven, Scottish soldier(b. c. 1580)
- April 5 – John Webster, colonial settler and governor of Connecticut (b. 1590)
- April 7 – William Brereton, English soldier and politician (b. 1604)
- April 11 – Lady Mary Bankes, English defender of Corfe Castle (b. 1598)
- April 19 – Joachim Gersdorff, Danish politician (b. 1611)
- May 5 – Charles Stuart, Duke of Cambridge (b. 1660)
- May 27 – Archibald Campbell, 1st Marquess of Argyll, Scottish dissenter (beheaded) (b. 1607)
- June 3 – Gottfried Scheidt, German composer (b. 1593)
- June 6 – Martino Martini, Italian Jesuit missionary (b. 1614)
- June 11 – George II, Landgrave of Hesse-Darmstadt (1626–1661) (b. 1605)
- June 13 – Henry Carey, 2nd Earl of Monmouth, English politician (b. 1595)
- June 21 – Andrea Sacchi, Italian painter of High Baroque Classicism (b. 1599)
- July 7 – Adriaan Heereboord, Dutch philosopher (b. 1613)
- July 9 – Frederick, Count Palatine of Zweibrücken (b. 1616)
- July 17 – Alonso Perez de Leon, Spanish conquistador, explorer, man of letters (b. 1608)
- August 6 – Marie Angélique Arnauld, French abbess of the Abbey of Port-Royal (b. 1591)
- August 7
  - Benedetta Carlini, Italian mystic (b. 1590)
  - Jin Shengtan, Chinese editor, writer and critic (b. 1608)
- August 16 – Thomas Fuller, English churchman and historian (b. 1608)
- August 18 – Robert Gordon of Straloch, Scottish cartographer (b. 1580)
- August 23 – Tokugawa Yorifusa, Japanese nobleman (b. 1603)
- September 7 – James Livingstone, 1st Viscount Kilsyth of Scotland (b. 1616)
- September 8 – Edward Vaux, 4th Baron Vaux of Harrowden, English baron (b. 1588)
- September 11 – Jan Fyt, Flemish Baroque painter (b. 1611)
- October 4 – Jacqueline Pascal, French child prodigy, sister of Blaise Pascal (b. 1625)
- October 6 – Guru Har Rai, Sikh guru (b. 1630)
- October 9 – Sir John Norwich, 1st Baronet, English Member of Parliament (b. 1613)
- October 15 – Jean de La Haye, French preacher and biblical scholar (b. 1593)
- October 25 – Lucas de Wael, Flemish painter (b. 1591)
- October 28
  - Agustín Moreto y Cavana, Spanish playwright (b. 1618)
  - Ottavio Amigoni, Italian painter (b. 1606)
- October 31 – Köprülü Mehmed Pasha, Ottoman Grand Vizier (b. c. 1575)
- November 1 – Philip Prospero, Prince of Asturias, heir apparent to the Spanish throne (b. 1657)
- November 2 – Daniel Seghers, Flemish Jesuit brother and painter (b. 1590)
- November 10 – Bernardino Spada, Italian Catholic cardinal (b. 1594)
- November 11 – David Ryckaert III, Flemish painter (b. 1612)
- November 19
  - Lars Kagg, Swedish count and military officer (b. 1595)
  - Brian Walton, English clergyman and scholar (b. 1600)
- December 7 – Ariana Nozeman, Dutch actress (b. ca. 1627)
- December 10 – Ottaviano Jannella, Italian sculptor (b. 1635)
- December 14 – Murad Bakhsh, Mughal prince (b. 1624)
- December 22 – Hoshina Masasada, Japanese daimyō (b. 1588)
- December 29 – Antoine Girard de Saint-Amant, French poet (b. 1594)
- date unknown – Jacomina de Witte, politically influential Dutch woman (b. 1582)

1662

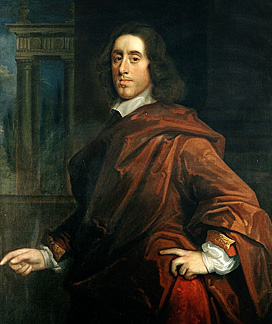
Henry Vane the Younger

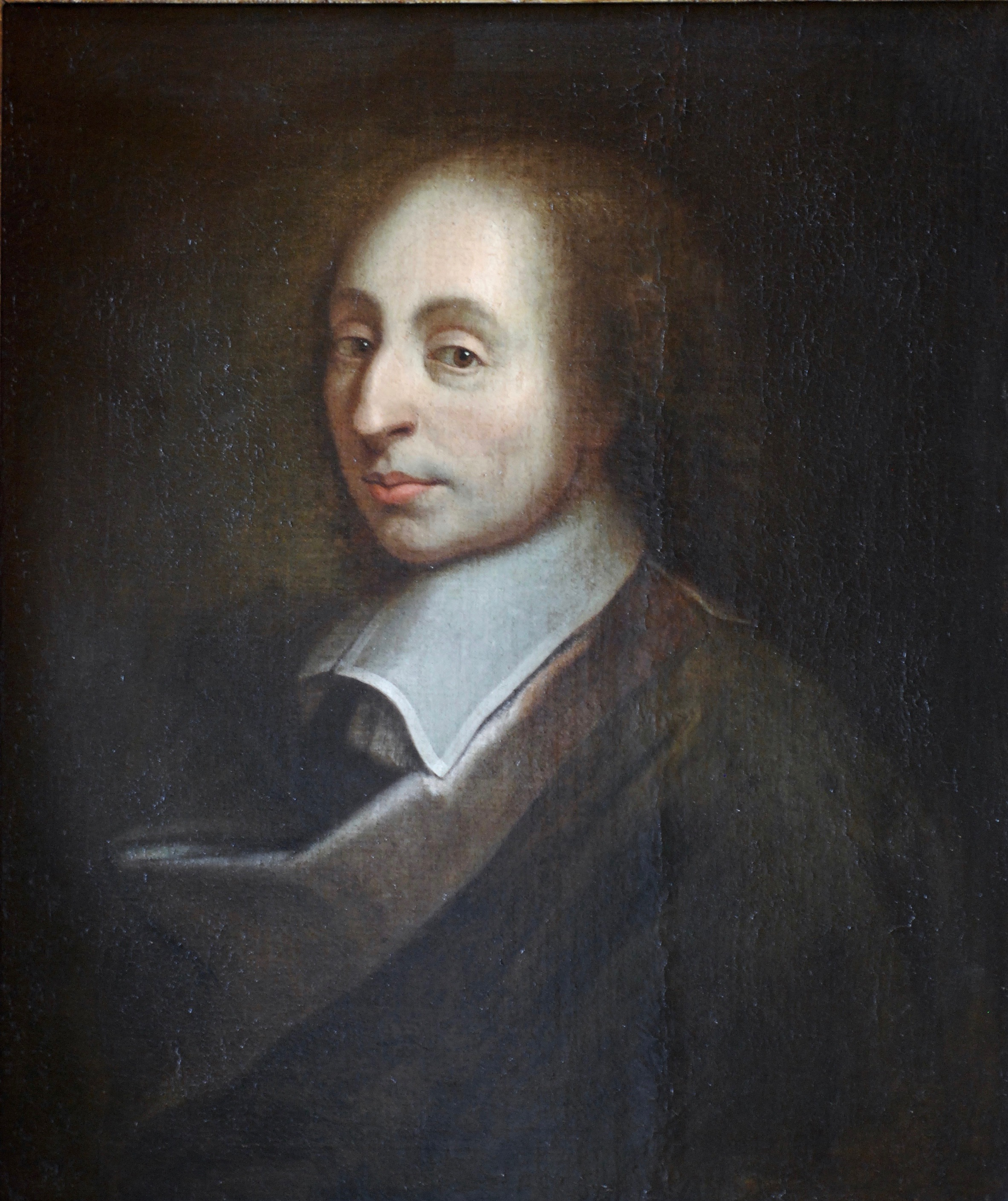
Blaise Pascal

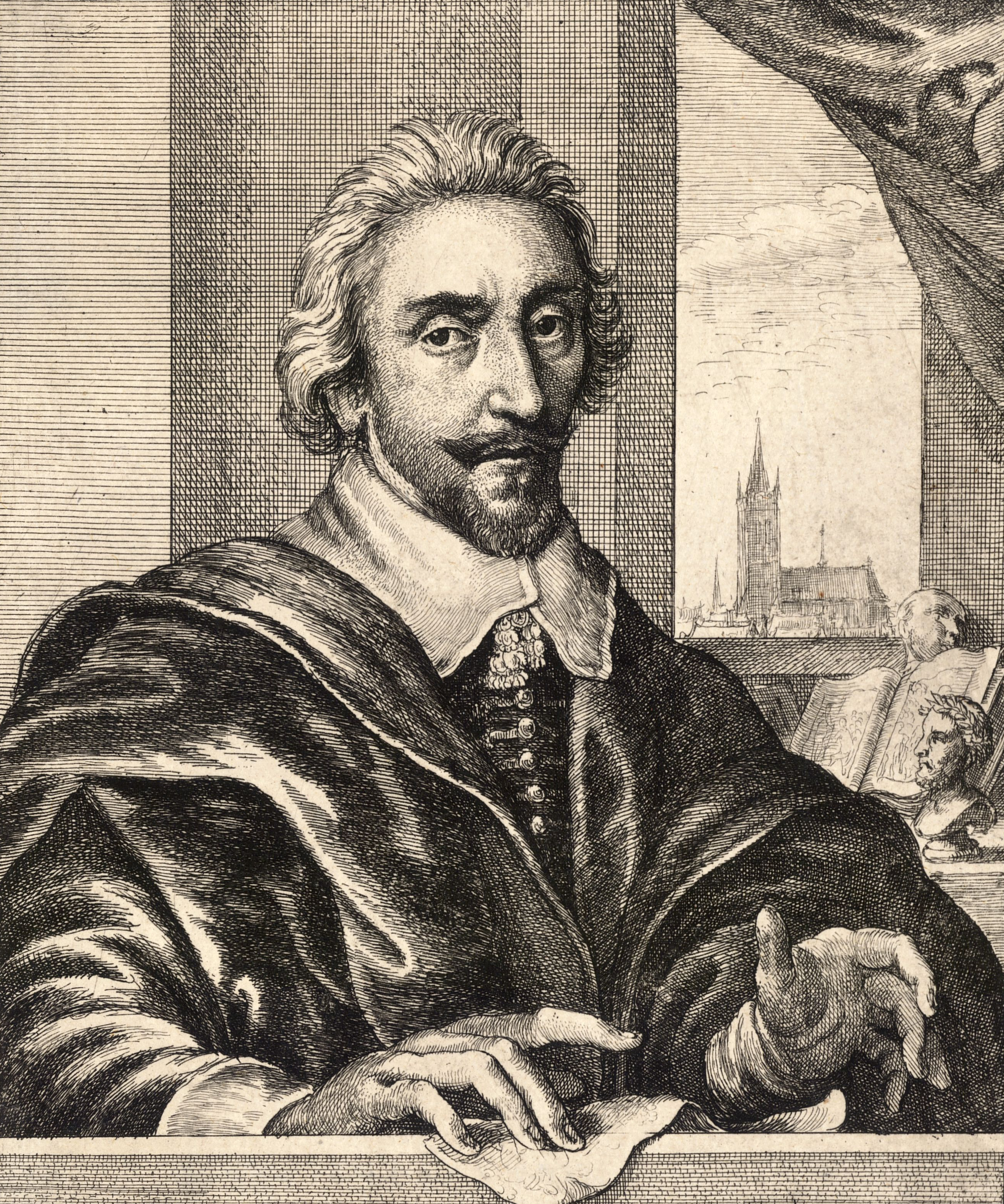
Adriaen van de Venne

- January 6 – Sir Francis Drake, 2nd Baronet, English Member of Parliament (b. 1617)
- January 10 – Honoré II, Prince of Monaco (b. 1597)
- January 13 – Christian Keymann, German hymnwriter (b. 1607)
- January 22 – Henry Lingen, English politician (b. 1612)
- January 23 – John Kemény, Prince of Transylvania (b. 1607)
- February 9 – Judith Quiney, English daughter of William Shakespeare (b. 1585)
- February 13
  - Elizabeth Stuart, Queen of Bohemia (b. 1596)
  - Carlo I Cybo-Malaspina, marquisate of Massa (b. 1581)
- February 21
  - John Stawell, English Member of Parliament (b. 1600)
  - Joris Jansen Rapelje, Early Dutch settler in colonial North America (b. 1604)
- February 23 – Johann Crüger, German composer of well-known hymns (b. 1598)
- March 10 – Samuel Hartlib, British scholar (b. 1600)
- March 17 – Jerome Weston, 2nd Earl of Portland (b. 1605)
- March 20 – François le Métel de Boisrobert, French poet (b. 1592)
- April 14 – William Fiennes, 1st Viscount Saye and Sele, English statesman (b. 1582)
- April 8
  - Albert d'Orville, Jesuit priest and missionary, cartographer (b. 1621)
  - Birgitte Thott, Danish scholar, writer and translator (b. 1610)
- April 22 – John Tradescant the Younger, English botanist (b. 1608)
- April 24 – Elizabeth Ribbing, Swedish noble (b. 1596)
- May 7 – Lucrezia Orsina Vizzana, Italian singer and composer (b. 1590)
- May 8 – Peter Heylin, English ecclesiastic and author of many polemical works (b. 1599)
- May 16 – John Ley, English priest (b. 1583)
- May 17
  - Abraham de Fabert, Marshal of France (b. 1599)
  - William, Duke of Saxe-Weimar, German nobleman (b. 1598)
- May 18 – Adam Billaut, French poet, carpenter (b. 1602)
- May 23 – John Gauden, English bishop and writer (b. 1605)
- May 28 – Robert Douglas, Count of Skenninge, Swedish field marshal (b. 1611)
- June 1 – Zhu Youlang, the 4th and last emperor of the Southern Ming dynasty of China (b. 1623)
- June 14 – Henry Vane the Younger, British Governor of Massachusetts (b. 1613)
- June 23 – Koxinga, Chinese military leader (b. 1624)
- June 29 – Pierre de Marca, French bishop and historian (b. 1594)
- July 3 – Pierre Chanut, French diplomat (b. 1601)
- July 12 – Louis Henry, Prince of Nassau-Dillenburg, military leader in the Thirty Years' War (b. 1594)
- July 14 – Camilla Faà, secret wife of the Duke of Mantua (b. c. 1599)
- July 16 – Alfonso IV d'Este, Duke of Modena (b. 1634)
- July 30 – Klas Hansson Bjelkenstjerna, Swedish naval officer and civil servant (b. 1615)
- August 8 – Angelo Giori, Italian Catholic cardinal (b. 1586)
- August 14 – Christina Magdalena of the Palatinate-Zweibrücken, Swedish Princess (b. 1616)
- August 16 – Ignace Cotolendi, French bishop (b. 1630)
- August 19 – Blaise Pascal, French mathematician, physicist, and philosopher (b. 1623)
- September 3 – William Lenthall, English politician (b. 1591)
- September 21 – Adriaen van Stalbemt, Flemish Baroque painter (b. 1580)
- September 22 – John Biddle, English theologian (b. 1615)
- October 21 – Henry Lawes, English composer (b. 1595)
- October 29 – William Pynchon, English colonist and fur trader in North America (b. 1590)
- November 12 – Adriaen van de Venne, Dutch painter (b. 1589)
- November 15 – Hugh Audley, English lawyer and philosopher (b. 1577)
- November 20 – Archduke Leopold Wilhelm of Austria, Governor of the Spanish Netherlands (b. 1614)
- December 3 – William Dugard, English printer (b. 1606)
- December 5 – Isidoro Bianchi, Italian painter (b. 1581)
- December 20 – Axel Lillie, Swedish politician (b. 1603)
- December 30 – Ferdinand Charles, Archduke of Austria, regent of the Tyrol and Further Austria (b. 1628)

1663

John Berchmans

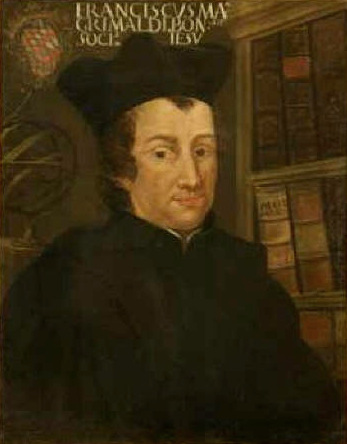
Francesco Maria Grimaldi

- January 2 – Illiam Dhone, Manx politician (b. 1608)
- January 6 – George Goring, 1st Earl of Norwich, English soldier, politician (b. 1585)
- January 22 – Giancarlo de' Medici, Italian Catholic cardinal (b. 1611)
- January 29 – Robert Sanderson, English theologian and casuist (b. 1587)
- January 31 – John Spelman, English politician (b. 1606)
- February 19 – Adam Adami, German bishop, diplomat (b. 1603)
- March 13 – Edward, Count Palatine of Simmern (b. 1625)
- March 17 – Jerome Weston, 2nd Earl of Portland, English diplomat and landowner (b. 1605)
- March 20 – Biagio Marini, Italian violinist and composer (b. 1594)
- April 5 – John Norton, American divine (b. 1606)
- April 7 – Francis Cooke, English Mayflower Pilgrim (b. c. 1583)
- April 17 – David Questiers, Dutch poet (b. 1623)
- April 20 – Kjeld Stub, Danish priest (b. 1607)
- April 29 – Princess Margaret Yolande of Savoy, duchess consort of Parma (b. 1635)
- May 3 – Johan Björnsson Printz, governor of New Sweden (b. 1592)
- May 6 – Johan van Rensselaer, Dutch noble (b. 1625)
- May 11 – Henri II d'Orléans, Duke of Longueville, Prince of France (b. 1595)
- March 20 – Selius Marselis, Dutch/Norwegian tradesman (b. 1600)
- May 30 – Jean Guyon, French colonist (b. 1592)
- June 4 – William Juxon, Archbishop of Canterbury (b. 1582)
- June 5 – Béatrix de Cusance, Frenc-Comtois noble woman (b. 1614)
- June 20 – Catherine Henriette de Bourbon, French noble (b. 1596)
- June 25 – John Bramhall, Archbishop of Armagh, Anglican controversialist (b. 1594)
- June 26 – John Alleyn, Cornish barrister (b. 1621)
- July 2 – Thomas Selle, German baroque composer (b. 1599)
- July 5 – Samuel Newman, colonial Massachusetts clergyman (b. 1602)
- July 7 – Thomas Baltzar, German violinist (b. c. 1631)
- July 13 – Sir Thomas Myddelton, 1st Baronet, English politician (b. 1624)
- July 16 – William VI, Landgrave of Hesse-Kassel (1637–1663) (b. 1629)
- July 20 – Samuel Stone, Connecticut Puritan minister (b. 1602)
- August 10 – Edward Convers, American settler (b. 1590)
- August 26 – Sir John Yonge, 1st Baronet, English politician (b. 1603)
- September 18 – Joseph of Cupertino, Italian saint (b. 1603)
- September 20 – Thomas Stucley (MP), English politician (b. 1620)
- September 27
  - Christoffer Urne, Governor General of Norway (b. 1593)
  - Philip, Duke of Schleswig-Holstein-Sonderburg-Glücksburg (b. 1584)
- October 7 – Sophia Eleonore of Hesse-Darmstadt, Landgravine consort of Hesse-Homburg (b. 1634)
- October 13 – Susanna Margarete of Anhalt-Dessau, Princess of Anhalt-Dessau (b. 1610)
- October 20 – Raphael Cotoner, Spanish 60th Grandmaster of the Knights Hospitaller (b. 1601)
- October 31 – Théophile Raynaud, French theologian (b. 1583)
- November 24 – Louis IV of Legnica, Duke of Oława and Brzeg (b. 1616)
- December 5 – Severo Bonini, Italian composer (b. 1582)
- December 17 – Queen Nzinga of Ndongo and Matamba (b. c. 1583)
- December 21
  - Camillo Astalli, Italian cardinal (b. 1616)
  - Thomas Bruce, 1st Earl of Elgin, Scottish nobleman (b. 1599)
- December 27 – Christine of France, Duchess of Savoy (b. 1606)
- December 28 – Francesco Maria Grimaldi, Italian mathematician, physicist (b. 1618)
- date unknown – Chiara Varotari, Italian Baroque painter (b. 1584)
- date unknown – Bihari Lal, Indian Poet (b. 1595)

1664

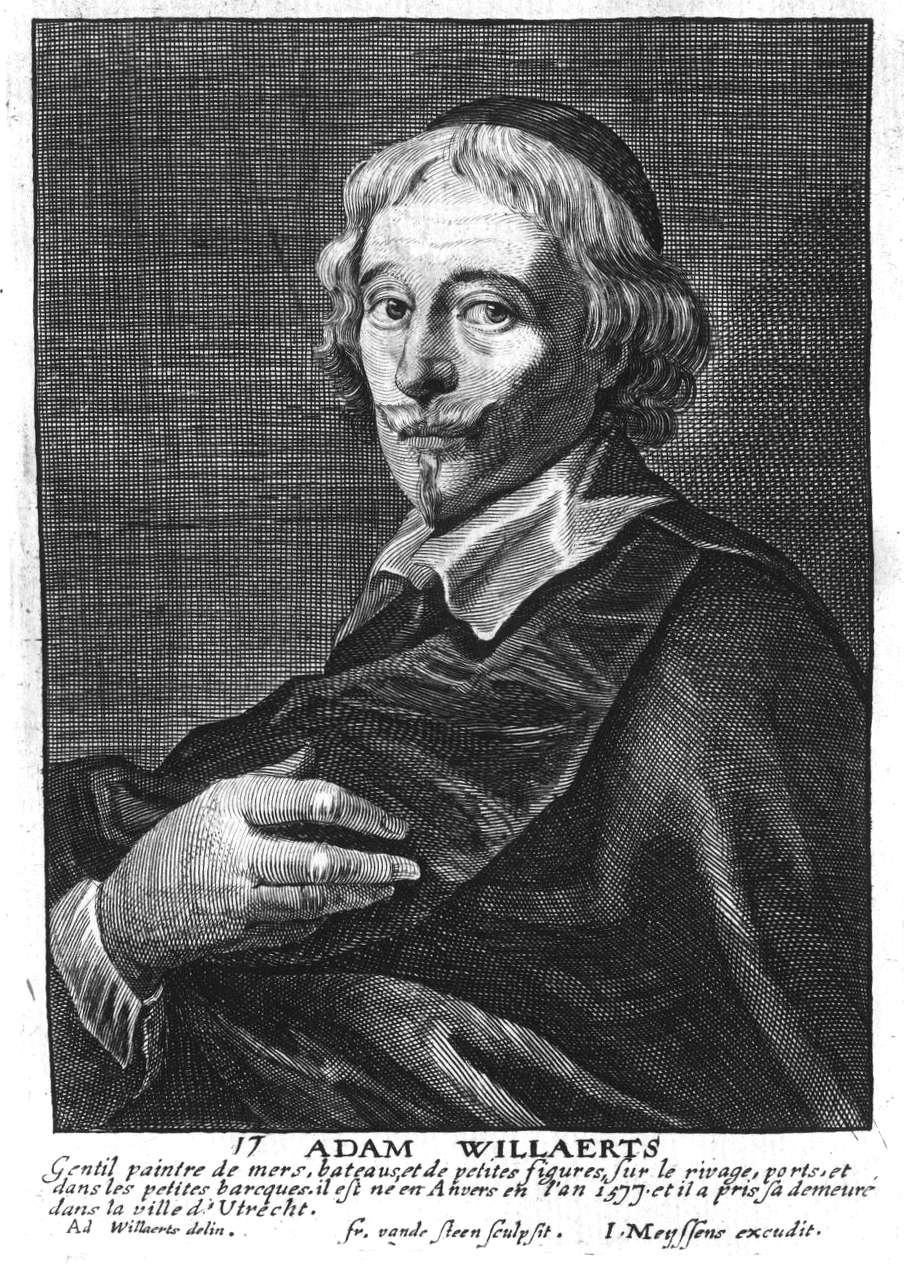
Adam Willaerts

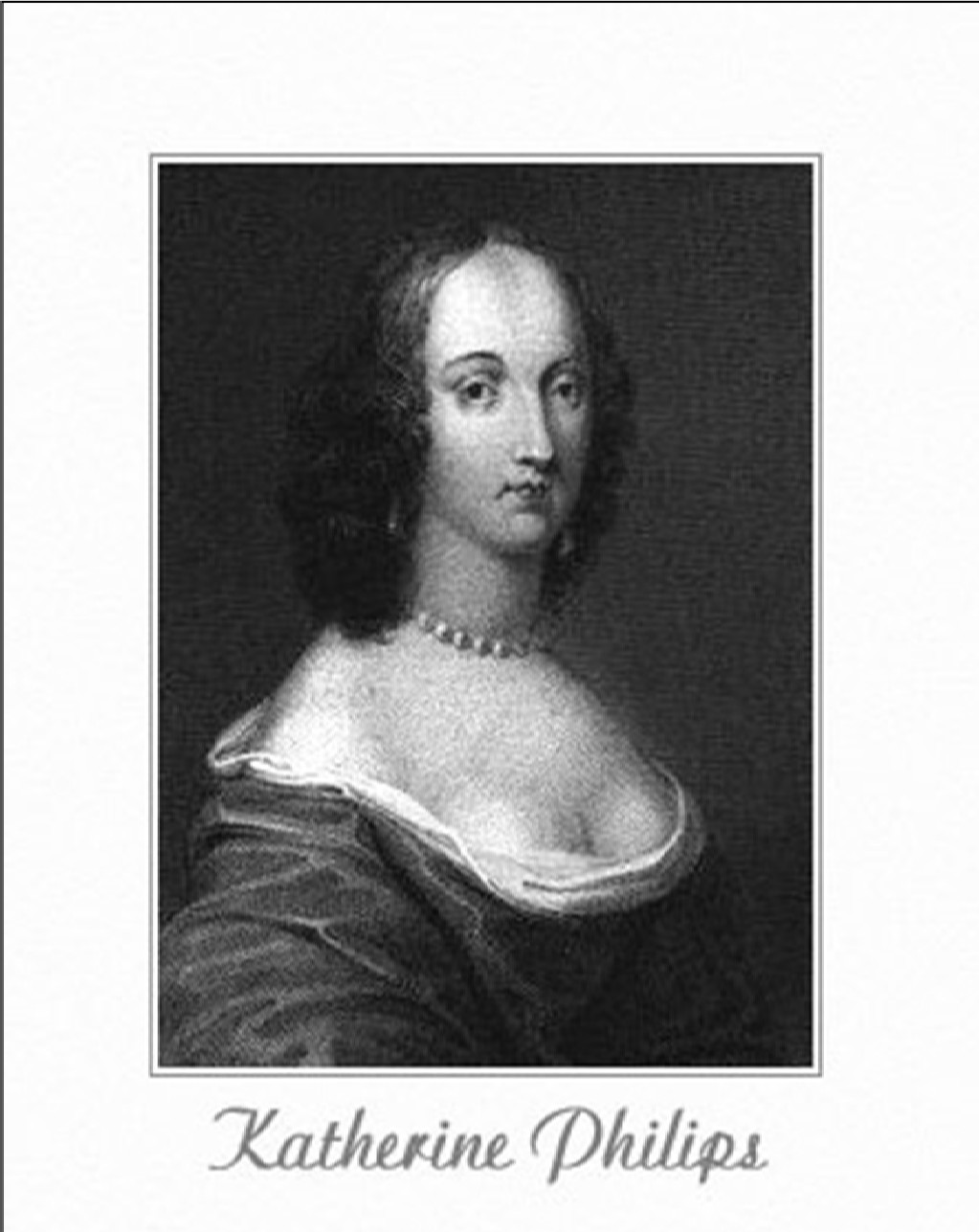
Katherine Philips
- January 10 – Antoon Sanders, Dutch priest and historian (b. 1586)
- January 14 – Françoise Madeleine d'Orléans, French princess (b. 1648)
- January 27 – Archduke Charles Joseph of Austria, Roman Catholic bishop (b. 1649)
- January 30 – Cornelis de Graeff, Dutch mayor (b. 1599)
- February 16 – Sir John Trelawny, 1st Baronet, British baronet (b. 1592)
- February 20 – Corfitz Ulfeldt, Danish statesman (b. 1606)
- February 26 – Emmanuel Stupanus, Swiss physician (b. 1587)
- March 7 – Bernhard von Mallinckrodt, German bibliophile (b. 1591)
- March 16 – Ivan Vyhovsky, Ukrainian Cossack leader
- March 19 – Francisco de Araujo, Spanish theologian (b. 1580)
- March 30 – Guru Har Krishan, 8th Guru of Sikhism (b. 1656)
- March 31 – Charlotte Stanley, Countess of Derby, English defender of Latham House (b. 1599)
- April 4 – Adam Willaerts, Dutch painter (b. 1577)
- April 24 – Silvius I Nimrod, Duke of Württemberg-Oels (b. 1622)
- May 19 – Elisabeth de Bourbon-Vendôme, French princess (b. 1614)
- May 21 – Elizabeth Poole, Puritan and business woman (b. c. 1599)
- June 1 – Michiel Sweerts, Flemish painter (b. 1618)
- June 2 – Henry II, Duke of Guise (b. 1614)
- June 22 – Katherine Philips, Anglo-Welsh poet (b. 1631)
- July – Jan Janssonius, Dutch cartographer (b. 1588)
- July 4 – George III of Brieg, Duke of Brzeg (1633–1664) (b. 1611)
- July 15 – Abraham Ecchellensis, Lebanese Maronite philosopher (b. 1605)
- July 12 – Stefano della Bella, Italian printmaker (b. 1610)
- July 16 – Andreas Gryphius, German writer (b. 1616)
- July 19 – Egbert van der Poel, Dutch painter (b. 1621)
- July 31 – Goschwin Nickel, Jesuit leader (b. 1582)
- August 3 – Jacopo Vignali, Italian painter (b. 1592)
- August 16 – Johannes Buxtorf II, Swiss theologian (b. 1599)
- August 23 – Jean Bagot, French theologian (b. 1591)
- August 24 – Maria Cunitz, Silesian astronomer (b. 1610)
- August 27 – Francisco de Zurbarán, Spanish painter (b. 1598)
- September 2 – Antoine de Laloubère, French Jesuit mathematician (b. 1600)
- October 31 – William Frederick, Prince of Nassau-Dietz, Dutch stadtholder (b. 1613)
- November 2 – George Ghica, Prince of Moldavia and Wallachia (b. 1600)
- November 17 – Nicolas Perrot d'Ablancourt, Translator (b. 1606)
- November 18 – Miklós Zrínyi, Croatian and Hungarian military leader, statesman (b. 1620)
- December 15 – Dietrich Reinkingk, German lawyer and politician (b. 1590)
- December 25 – Niccolò Ludovisi, Prince of Piombino (b. 1613)
- December 26 – Eleonore Dorothea of Anhalt-Dessau, Duchess of Saxe-Weimar by marriage (b. 1602)
- date unknown – Gu Mei, politically influential Chinese Gējì, poet and painter (b. 1619)

1665

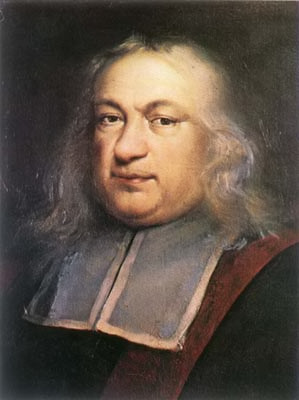
Pierre de Fermat

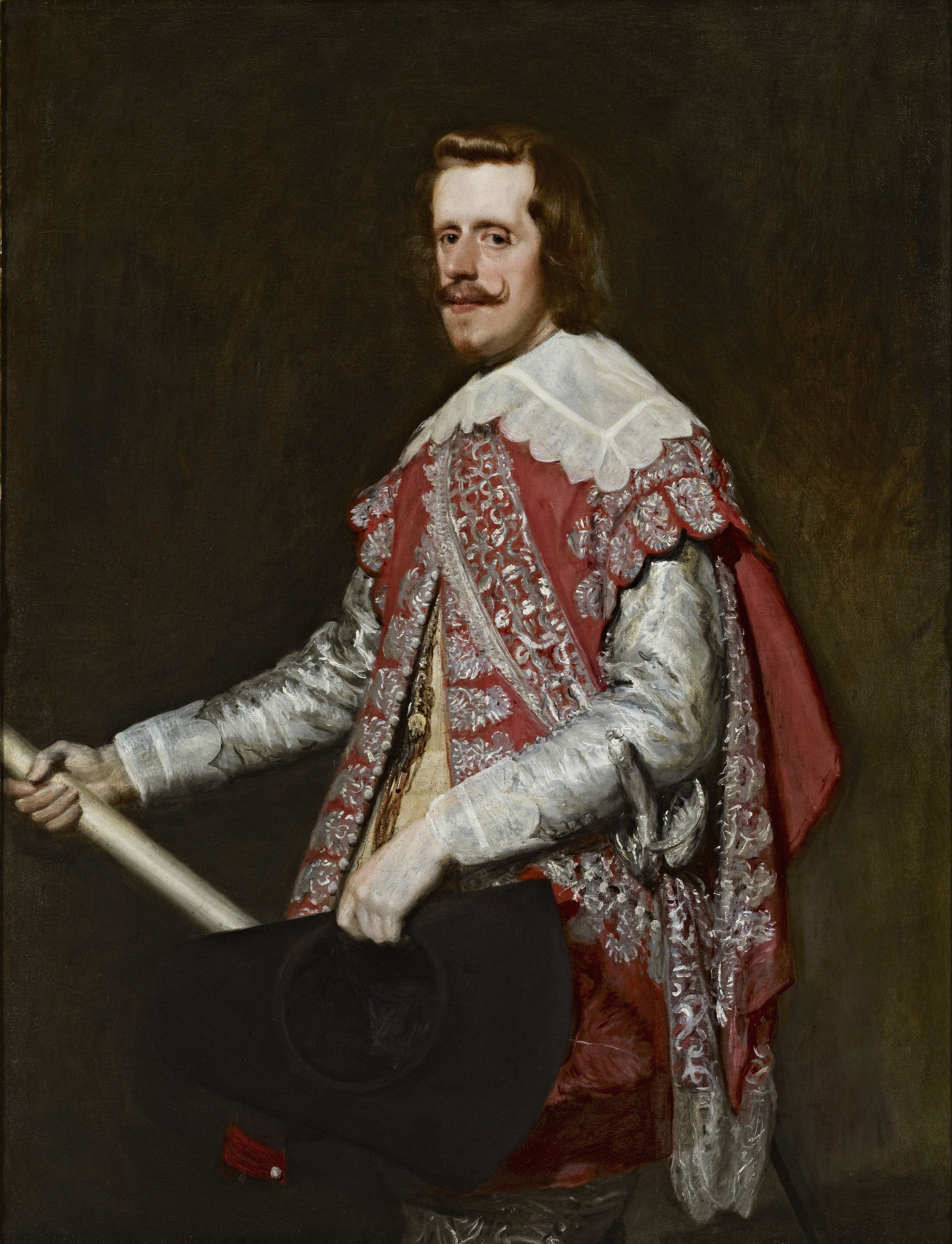
King Philip of Spain

- January 1 – Christian William of Brandenburg, administrator of the bishoprics of Magdeburg and Halberstadt (b. 1587)
- January 4 – Herman Fortunatus, Margrave of Baden-Rodemachern (b. 1595)
- January 11 – Louise de La Fayette, French courtier, friend of King Louis XIII (b. 1618)
- January 12 – Pierre de Fermat, French mathematician (b. 1607)
- January 29 – Jeanne des Anges, French Ursuline nun in Loudun (b. 1602)
- January 31 – Johannes Clauberg, German theologian and philosopher (b. 1622)
- March 1 – Thomas Wentworth, 5th Baron Wentworth, English baron and politician (b. 1612)
- March 11 – Clemente Tabone, Maltese landowner and militia member (b. c. 1575)
- March 15 – Christian Louis, Duke of Brunswick-Lüneburg (b. 1622)
- April 21 – Jean-Joseph Surin, French Jesuit writer (b. 1600)
- May 24 – Mary of Jesus of Ágreda, Franciscan abbess and spiritual writer (b. 1602)
- May 31 – Pieter Jansz. Saenredam, Dutch painter (b. 1597)
- June 3
  - Charles Berkeley, 1st Earl of Falmouth, son of Charles Berkeley (b. 1630)
  - James Ley, 3rd Earl of Marlborough, English nobleman, sailor, and mathematician (b. 1618)
- June 6 – George Christian, Prince of East Frisia, prince of Ostfriesland (b. 1634)
- June 13 – Egbert Bartholomeusz Kortenaer, Dutch admiral (b. 1604)
- June 17 – Maria Elisabeth of Holstein-Gottorp, Landgravine of Hesse-Darmstadt (b. 1634)
- June 25 – Sigismund Francis, Archduke of Austria, regent of Tyrol and Further Austria (b. 1630)
- July 11 – Kenelm Digby, English privateer (b. 1603)
- July 18 – Stefan Czarniecki, Polish general (b. 1599)
- August 14 – Charles II, Duke of Mantua and Montferrat, son of Charles of Gonzaga-Nevers of Rethel (b. 1629)
- August 28 – Elisabetta Sirani, Italian painter (b. 1638)
- September 1 – Walter Erle, English politician (b. 1586)
- September 2 – Juan Alonso de Cuevas y Davalos, Roman Catholic prelate, Archbishop of Mexico and Antequera (b. 1590)
- September 12 – Jean Bolland, Flemish Jesuit writer (b. 1596)
- September 17 – King Philip IV of Spain (b. 1605)
- September 25 – Maria Anna of Austria, Electress of Bavaria (b. 1610)
- October 22 – César, Duke of Vendôme, French nobleman (b. 1594)
- November 1 – Sir John Perceval, 1st Baronet, Irish nobleman (b. 1629)
- November 10 – Samuel Capricornus, Czech composer (b. 1628)
- November 17 – John Earle (bishop), English bishop (b. 1601)
- November 19 – Nicolas Poussin, French painter (b. 1594)
- November 20 – Julius Henry, Duke of Saxe-Lauenburg (b. 1586)
- November 24 – Simon Le Moyne, French missionary (b. 1604)
- December 2
  - Catherine de Vivonne, marquise de Rambouillet, French socialite (b. 1588)
  - Maria Angela Astorch, Spanish Roman Catholic religious figure, mystic and blessed (b. 1592)
- December 10 – Tarquinio Merula, Italian composer (b. c. 1594)
- December 29 – George Wilde, Irish bishop (b. 1610)

1666

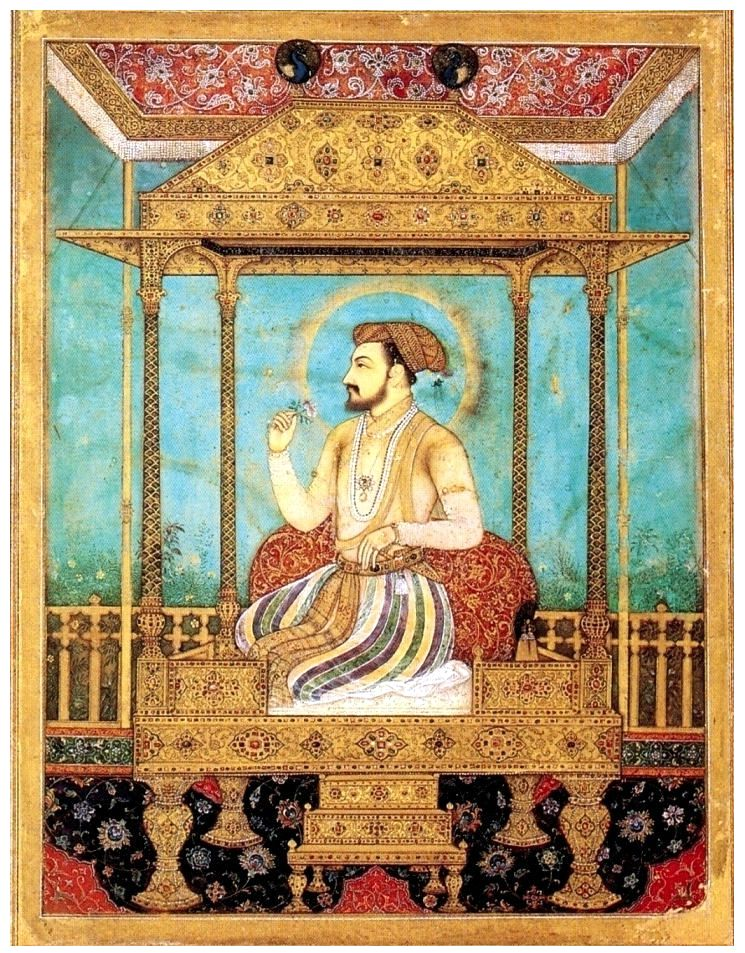
Shah Jahan

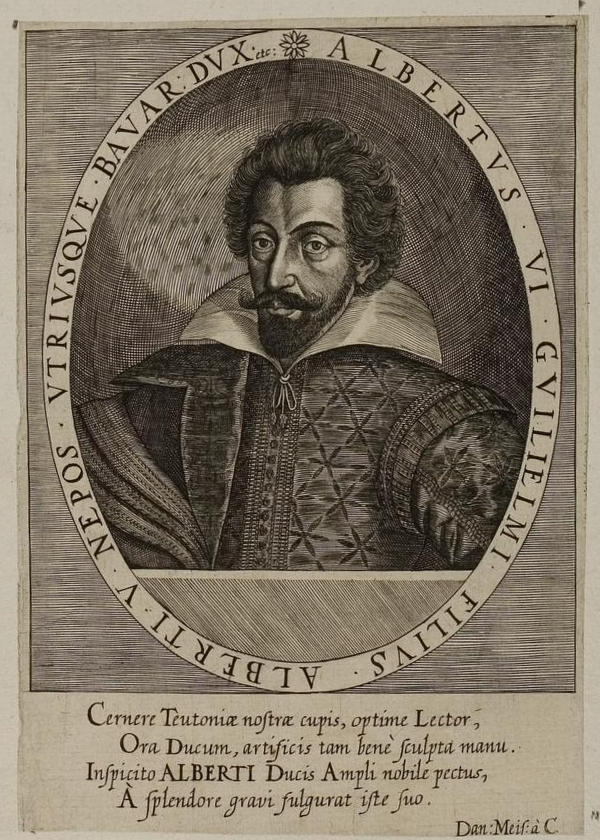
Albert VI, Duke of Bavaria

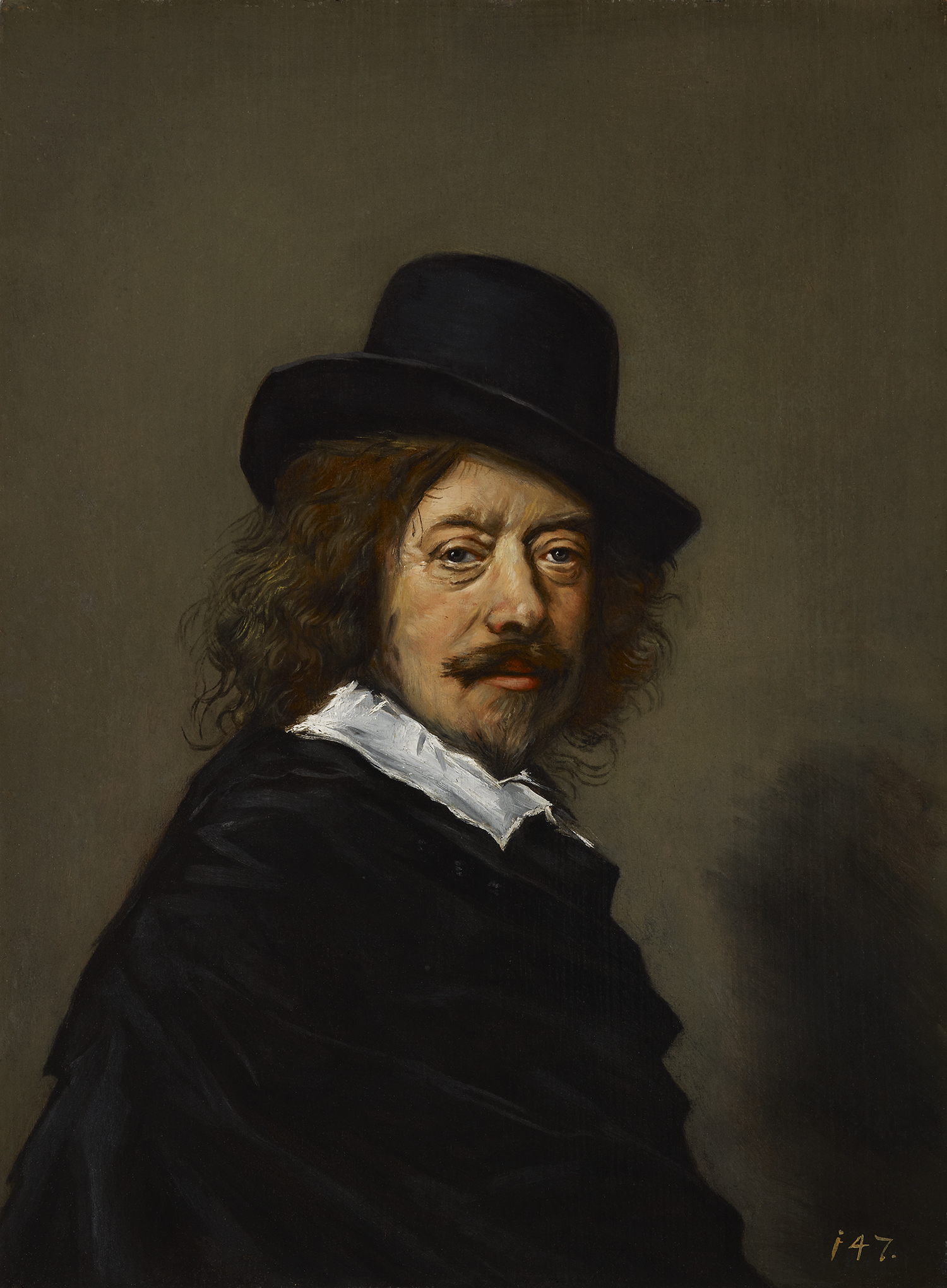
Frans Hals

- January 2 – John Holles, 2nd Earl of Clare, English politician and Earl (b. 1595)
- January 10 – Henry Hastings, 1st Baron Loughborough, English Royalist army commander (b. 1610)
- January 20 – Anne of Austria, queen of Louis XIII of France and regent (b. 1601)
- January 22 – Shah Jahan, Mughal Emperor of India (b. 1592)
- January 24 – Johann Andreas Herbst, German composer (b. 1588)
- January 28 – Tommaso Dingli, Maltese architect and sculptor (b. 1591)
- February 12 – Mildmay Fane, 2nd Earl of Westmorland, English politician (b. 1602)
- February 24 – Nicholas Lanier, English composer (b. 1588)
- February 26 – Armand de Bourbon, Prince of Conti, Frondeur (b. 1629)
- February 27
  - Luisa de Guzmán, Duchess of Braganza and Queen consort of Portugal (b. 1613)
  - Gustav Evertsson Horn, Finnish-Swedish politician, Field Marshal (b. 1614)
- March 1 – Ecaterina Cercheza, Princess consort of Moldavia (b. 1620)
- March 18 – Jan van Vliet, Dutch linguist (b. 1622)
- April 12 – Johann Rudolf Wettstein, Swiss diplomat (b. 1594)
- April 25 – Johann Reinhard II, Count of Hanau-Lichtenberg, German aristocrat (b. 1628)
- May 6 – Paul Siefert, German composer and organist (b. 1586)
- May 13 – Pier Francesco Mola, Italian painter of the High Baroque (b. 1612)
- May 22 – Gaspar Schott, German Jesuit scholar (b. 1608)
- June 11 – Cornelis Evertsen the Elder, Dutch admiral (b. 1610)
- June 12 – Abraham van der Hulst, Dutch admiral (b. 1619)
- June 16 – Sir Richard Fanshawe, British diplomat and translator (b. 1608)
- June 17 – Carlo de' Medici, Italian Catholic cardinal (b. 1595)
- June 28 – Sir Gervase Clifton, 1st Baronet, English politician (b. 1587)
- June 30 – Alexander Brome, English poet (b. 1620)
- July 5 – Albert VI, Duke of Bavaria (b. 1584)
- July 18 – Sir John Bowyer, 1st Baronet, English soldier and politician (b. 1623)
- July 25 – Henri, Count of Harcourt (b. 1601)
- July 26 – Camillo Francesco Maria Pamphili, Italian Catholic cardinal (b. 1622)
- July 30 – Francis Erdmann, Duke of Saxe-Lauenburg, Germany (b. 1629)
- August 5 – Johan Evertsen, Dutch admiral (b. 1600)
- August 6 – Tjerk Hiddes de Vries, Frisian naval hero and commander (of wounds received in the St. James's Day Battle) (b. 1622)
- August 15 – Johann Adam Schall von Bell, German Jesuit missionary (b. 1591)
- August 19 – Anton Günther I, Count of Schwarzburg-Sondershausen (b. 1620)
- August 23 – Johannes Hoornbeek, Dutch theologian (b. 1617)
- August 24 – Francisco Manuel de Mello, Portuguese writer (b. 1608)
- August 26 – Frans Hals, Dutch painter (b. 1580)
- September 4 – Girolamo Colonna, Catholic cardinal (b. 1604)
- September 10 – Christian Günther II, Count of Schwarzburg-Sondershausen-Arnstadt (b. 1616)
- September 17 – Augustus the Younger, Duke of Brunswick-Lüneburg (b. 1579)
- September 23 – François Mansart, French architect (b. 1598)
- September 27
  - Georg Albrecht, Margrave of Brandenburg-Bayreuth-Kulmbach (b. 1619)
  - János Szalárdi, Hungarian historian (b. 1601)
- October 12 – Dirk Graswinckel, Dutch jurist (b. 1600)
- October 27 – Manuel António of Portugal, Dutch-Portuguese nobleman (b. 1600)
- October 29 – Edmund Calamy the Elder, English Presbyterian leader (b. 1600)
- October 29 – James Shirley, English dramatist (b. 1596)
- November 1 – Jan Albertsz Rotius, Dutch painter (b. 1624)
- December 1 – James Ware, Irish genealogist (b. 1594)
- December 8 – Philippe Charles, Duke of Valois (b. 1664)
- December 20 – William Strode, English politician (b. 1589)
- December 22 – Guercino, Italian painter (b. 1591)
- December 26 – Alexandrine von Taxis, German Imperial General Post Master (b. 1589)
- December 30 – John Strangways, English politician (b. 1585)
- date unknown
  - Philip Fruytiers, Flemish painter (b. 1627)
  - James Howell, British writer (b. c. 1594)
  - Song Yingxing, Chinese encyclopedist (b. 1587)

1667

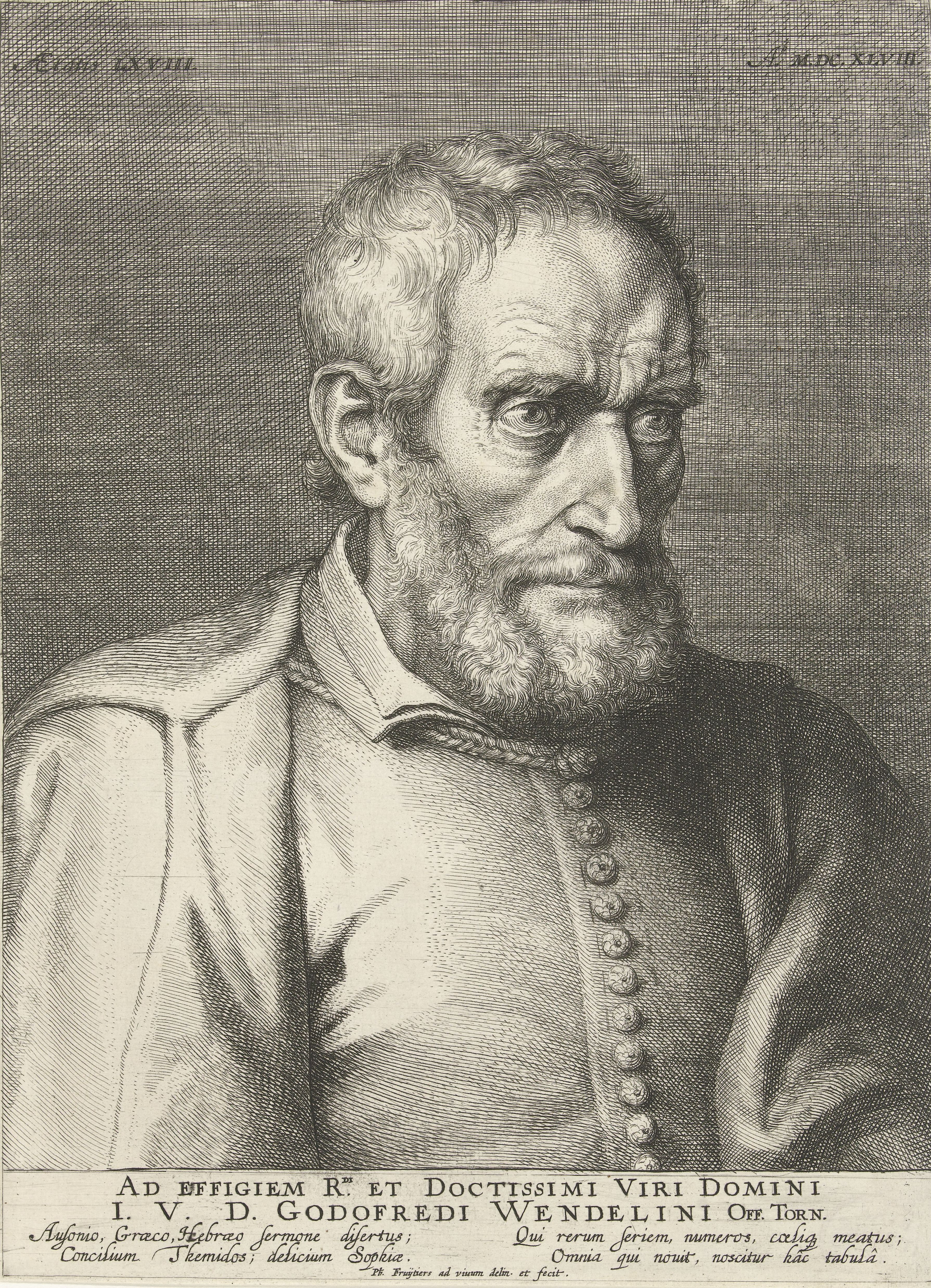
Godefroy Wendelin

- January 28 – Maria Klara of Dietrichstein, German noblewoman (b. 1626)
- February 16 – Vincenzo Maculani, Italian Catholic cardinal (b. 1578)
- April 2 – Reinhold Curicke, jurist and historian from Danzig (Gdańsk) (b. 1610)
- April 10 – Jan Marek Marci, Bohemian physician and scientist (b. 1595)
- April 13 – Bassam Al-Soukaria, Lebanese army commander (b. 1580)
- April 21 – Roger Hill, English politician (b. 1605)
- April 24 – Matthew Wren, influential English clergyman (b. 1585)
- April 25 – Peter of Saint Joseph Betancur, Spanish saint and missionary to Guatemala (b. 1626)
- May 2 – George Wither, English writer (b. 1588)
- May 7 – Johann Jakob Froberger, German composer (b. 1616)
- May 10 – Marie Louise Gonzaga, Polish queen (b. 1611)
- May 14
  - Marcos Ramírez de Prado y Ovando, Archbishop of Mexico (b. 1592)
  - Georges de Scudéry, French novelist, dramatist and poet (b. 1601)
  - Johannes Heinrich Ursinus, German Lutheran scholar (b. 1608)
- May 16
  - Samuel Bochart, French Protestant biblical scholar (b. 1599)
  - Thomas Wriothesley, 4th Earl of Southampton, English statesman (b. 1607)
- May 22 – Pope Alexander VII (b. 1599)
- May 25 – Gustaf Bonde, Swedish statesman (b. 1620)
- May 26 – Albrecht von Kalckstein, German noble (b. 1592)
- May 28 – Jacques de Bela, French writer (b. 1586)
- June 5
  - Johann Heinrich Hottinger, Swiss philologist and theologian (b. 1620)
  - Francesco Sforza Pallavicino, Italian cardinal and historian (b. 1607)
  - Grégoire de Saint-Vincent, Flemish Jesuit and mathematician (b. 1584)
- June 18 – Countess Louise Henriette of Nassau, Electress Consort of Brandenburg (b. 1627)
- June 19 – Anthony Günther, Count of Oldenburg (b. 1583)
- June 20 – James Stuart, Duke of Cambridge, British prince (b. 1663)
- July 4
  - Christiaen van Couwenbergh, Dutch painter (b. 1604)
  - John VI, Prince of Anhalt-Zerbst (1621–1667) (b. 1621)
- July 7 – Nicolas Sanson, French cartographer (b. 1600)
- July 11 – Stefano Durazzo, Italian cardinal (b. 1594)
- July 13 – Barthélemy Vimont, French missionary (b. 1594)
- July 28 – Abraham Cowley, English poet (b. 1618)
- August 3 – Francesco Borromini, Swiss sculptor and architect (b. 1599)
- August 8 – Frances Hyde, Countess of Clarendon, English noble (b. 1617)
- August 13
  - Jeremy Taylor, Irish clergyman and writer (b. 1613)
  - Margaret Elisabeth of Leiningen-Westerburg, Regent of Hesse-Homburg (b. 1604)
- August 28 – Jai Singh I, Maharaja of Jaipur (b. 1611)
- September 3 – Alonzo Cano, Spanish painter (b. 1601)
- September 10 – Erasmus Earle, English barrister and politician (b. 1590)
- September 20 – Niels Trolle, Governor General of Norway (b. 1599)
- September 24 – Michael Franck, German composer and poet (b. 1609)
- September 28 – Thomas Hall, English politician (b. 1619)
- September 29 – Herbert Morley, English politician (b. 1616)
- October 11 – Mattias de' Medici, Italian noble (b. 1613)
- October 18 – Emperor Fasilides of Ethiopia (b. 1603)
- October 24 – Godefroy Wendelin, Flemish astronomer (b. 1580)
- October 22 – Albert II, Margrave of Brandenburg-Ansbach, German prince (b. 1620)
- October 25 – Ernst Adalbert of Harrach, Austrian Catholic cardinal (b. 1598)
- November 12 – Hans Nansen, Danish statesman (b. 1598)
- November 19 – Robert Wallop, English politician (b. 1601)
- November 28 – Jean de Thévenot, French traveler and scientist (b. 1633)
- December 31 – Jerzy Sebastian Lubomirski, Polish noble (szlachcic) (b. 1616)

1668

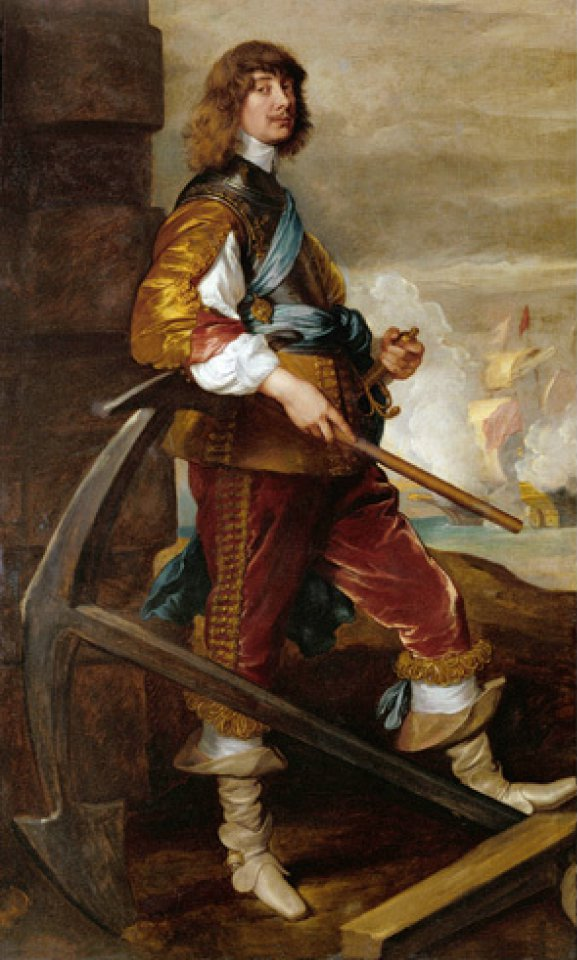
Algernon Percy, 10th Earl of Northumberland

- January 6
  - Luis de Benavides Carrillo, Marquis of Caracena (b. 1608)
  - Magdalene Sibylle of Saxony, Crown Princess of Denmark (b. 1617)
- January 14 – Arnauld de Oihenart, Basque historian and poet (b. 1592)
- January 31 – Hermann Busenbaum, German Jesuit theologian (b. 1600)
- February 2 – Antonio del Castillo y Saavedra, Spanish artist (b. 1616)
- February 8 – Alessandro Tiarini, Italian painter (b. 1577)
- February 21 – John Thurloe, English Puritan spy (b. 1616)
- March 16 – Francis Talbot, 11th Earl of Shrewsbury (b. 1623)
- April 12 – Alexander Daniell, sole proprietor of the Manor of Alverton, Cornwall (b. 1599)
- April 21 – Jan Boeckhorst, Flemish painter (b. c. 1604)
- May 1 – Frans Luycx, Flemish painter (b. 1604)
- May 8 – Catherine of St. Augustine, French nun and nurse of New France (b. 1632)
- May 9 – Otto Christoph von Sparr, German general (b. 1599)
- May 21 – Christoph Delphicus zu Dohna, Prussian-born Swedish soldier, diplomat (b. 1628)
- June 20 – Heinrich Roth, German Sanskrit scholar (b. 1620)
- July 26 – Hans Svane, Danish statesman (b. 1606)
- August 9 – Jakob Balde, German Latinist (b. 1604)
- August 23 – Artus Quellinus the Elder, Flemish sculptor (b. 1609)
- August 24 – Tyman Oosdorp, Dutch brewer and magistrate of Haarlem (b. 1613)
- September 16
  - Paolo Emilio Rondinini, Italian Bishop of Assisi (b. 1617)
  - Jan Miense Molenaer, Dutch painter (b. 1610)
- September 19 – Sir William Waller, English Civil War general (b. c. 1635)
- October 12 – Zacharias Wagenaer, secretary, painter, then merchant and administrator (Dutch East-India Company) (b. 1614)
- October 13
  - Robert Sutton, 1st Baron Lexinton, English politician (b. 1594)
  - Algernon Percy, 10th Earl of Northumberland, English military leader (b. 1602)
- November 17 – Joseph Alleine, English non-conformist preacher (b. 1634)
- November 21 – Adolf William, Duke of Saxe-Eisenach (b. 1632)
- December 3 – William Cecil, 2nd Earl of Salisbury, English earl (b. 1591)
- December 14 – Charles Berkeley, 2nd Viscount Fitzhardinge, English politician (b. 1599)
- December 23 – Martin Bauzer, Gorizian Jesuit priest and writer (b. 1595)
- December 24 – Wadham Wyndham, English judge (b. 1609)
- unknown date – Fang Weiyi, Chinese poet, calligrapher, painter and literature historian (b. 1585)

1669

Rembrandt

- January 27 – Gaspar de Crayer, Flemish painter (b. 1584)
- February 3 – Catharina Questiers, Dutch poet (b. 1631)
- February 13 – Peter Venables, English politician (b. 1604)
- February 23 – Lieuwe van Aitzema, Dutch historian and statesman (b. 1600)
- March 10 – John Denham, English poet (b. 1615)
- March 12 – Cornelis Jan Witsen, Mayor of Amsterdam (b. 1605)
- March 17 – Willem van der Zaan, Dutch admiral (b. 1621)
- March 23 – Philipp Buchner, German composer (b. 1614)
- March 25 – Sir Lionel Tollemache, 3rd Baronet, English baronet (b. 1624)
- April 4 – Johann Michael Moscherosch, German statesman, satirist (b. 1601)
- April 5 – Nabeshima Naozumi, Japanese daimyō (b. 1616)
- April 12 – Abdias Treu, German mathematician and academic (b. 1597)
- April 22 – Friedrich Wilhelm II, Duke of Saxe-Altenburg (1639–1669) (b. 1603)
- April 23 – Johannes Canuti Lenaeus, archbishop of Uppsala, Sweden (b. 1573)
- April 27 – Richard Treat, American city founder (b. 1584)
- May 1 – Isaac Thornton, English politician (b. 1615)
- May 14 – Georges de Scudéry, French writer (b. 1601)
- May 16 – Pietro da Cortona, Italian artist (b. 1596)
- June 25 – François de Vendôme, Duke of Beaufort, French soldier (b. 1616)
- July 16 – Thomas Howard, 1st Earl of Berkshire, English politician (b. 1587)
- July 29 – Josias II, Count of Waldeck-Wildungen, major general in Brunswick and co-ruler of Waldeck-Wildungen (b. 1636)
- August 18 – William Gawdy, English politician (b. 1612)
- August 28 – Sir William Drake, 1st Baronet, English politician (b. 1606)
- September 3 – Esteban Manuel de Villegas, Spanish poet (b. 1589)
- September 10 – Henrietta Maria of France, queen of England, Scotland and Ireland (b. 1609)
- September 28 – Pierre Le Muet, French architect (b. 1591)
- October 4 – Rembrandt Harmenszoon van Rijn, Dutch painter (b. 1606)
- October 9 – Richard Strode, English politician (b. 1584)
- October 14 – Antonio Cesti, Italian composer (b. 1623)
- October 16 – John Trapp, English theologian (b. 1601)
- October 19
  - Domenico Fiasella, Italian painter (b. 1589)
  - Matthias Sention, Sr., Connecticut settler (b. 1601)
- October 24 – William Prynne, English Puritan leader (b. 1600)
- November 3 – Charles Drelincourt, French Protestant divine (b. 1595)
- November 4 – Johannes Cocceius, Dutch theologian (b. 1603)
- November 7 – Lebrecht, Prince of Anhalt-Köthen, German prince of the House of Ascania (b. 1622)
- November 10 – Elisabeth Pepys, English wife of Samuel Pepys (b. 1640)
- December 9 – Pope Clement IX (b. 1600)
- December 11 – Anna Maria of Mecklenburg-Schwerin, consort of Augustus, Duke of Saxe-Weissenfels (b. 1627)
- December 13 – Thomas Dyke, English politician (b. 1619)
- December 16 – Nathaniel Fiennes, English politician (b. c. 1608)
- December 18 – Johann Philipp of Hanau-Lichtenberg, German nobleman (b. 1626)
- December 25 – George William, Count Palatine of Zweibrücken-Birkenfeld (b. 1591)
- December 31 – Bogusław Radziwiłł, Polish-Lithuanian noble (b. 1620)
