= 1662 =

1662 in various calendars
- Gregorian calendar: 1662; MDCLXII
- Ab urbe condita: 2415
- Armenian calendar: 1111; ԹՎ ՌՃԺԱ
- Assyrian calendar: 6412
- Balinese saka calendar: 1583–1584
- Bengali calendar: 1068–1069
- Berber calendar: 2612
- English Regnal year: 13 Cha. 2 – 14 Cha. 2
- Buddhist calendar: 2206
- Burmese calendar: 1024
- Byzantine calendar: 7170–7171
- Chinese calendar: 辛丑年 (Metal Ox); 4359 or 4152 — to — 壬寅年 (Water Tiger); 4360 or 4153
- Coptic calendar: 1378–1379
- Discordian calendar: 2828
- Ethiopian calendar: 1654–1655
- Hebrew calendar: 5422–5423
- Hindu calendars
- Vikram Samvat: 1718–1719
- Shaka Samvat: 1583–1584
- Kali Yuga: 4762–4763
- Holocene calendar: 11662
- Igbo calendar: 662–663
- Iranian calendar: 1040–1041
- Islamic calendar: 1072–1073
- Japanese calendar: Kanbun 2 (寛文２年)
- Javanese calendar: 1584–1585
- Julian calendar: Gregorian minus 10 days
- Korean calendar: 3995
- Minguo calendar: 250 before ROC 民前250年
- Nanakshahi calendar: 194
- Thai solar calendar: 2204–2205
- Tibetan calendar: ལྕགས་མོ་གླང་ལོ་ (female Iron-Ox); 1788 or 1407 or 635 — to — ཆུ་ཕོ་སྟག་ལོ་ (male Water-Tiger); 1789 or 1408 or 636

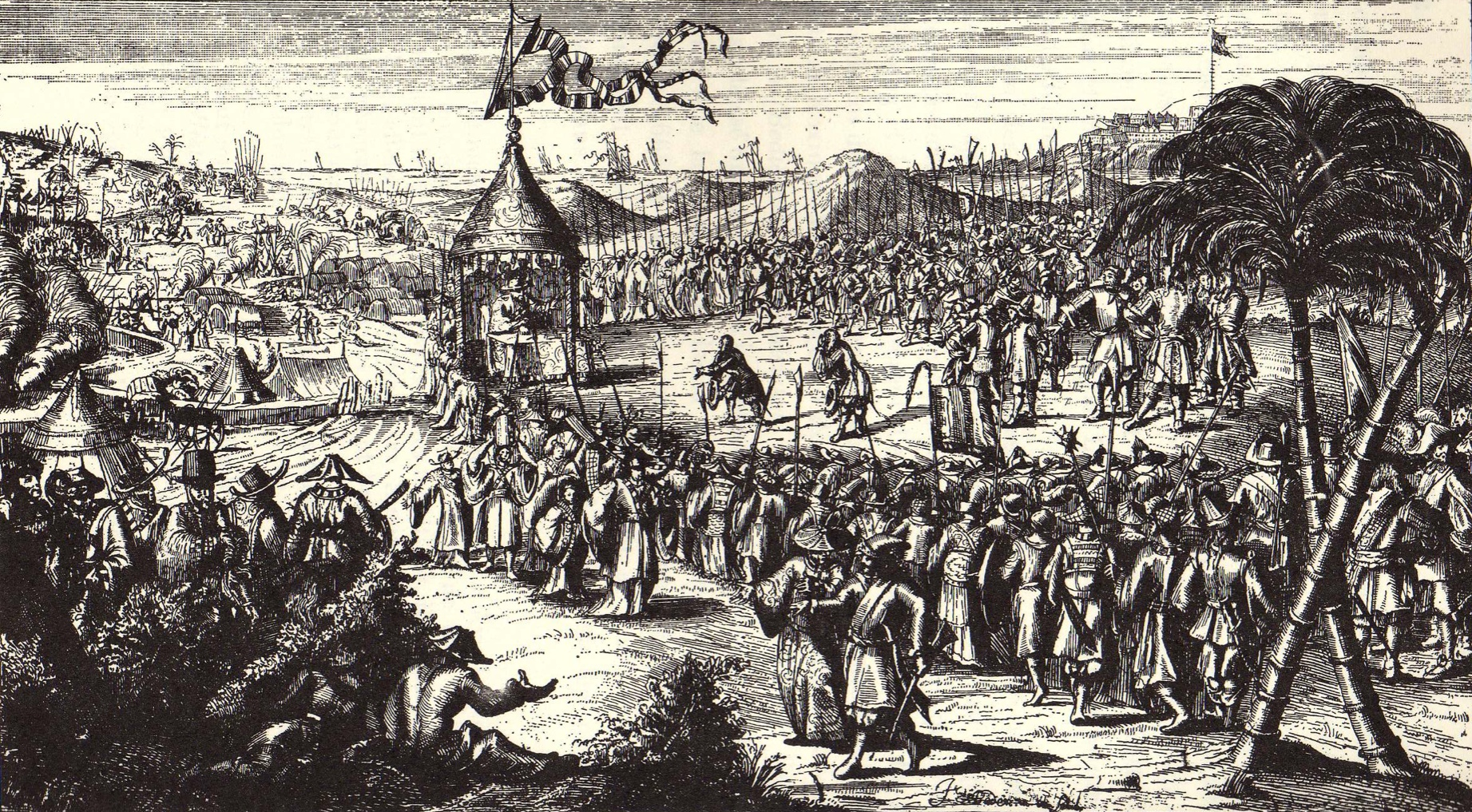
February 1: The Dutch East India Company surrenders control of Taiwan and Fort Zeelandia to invaders from Mainland China.

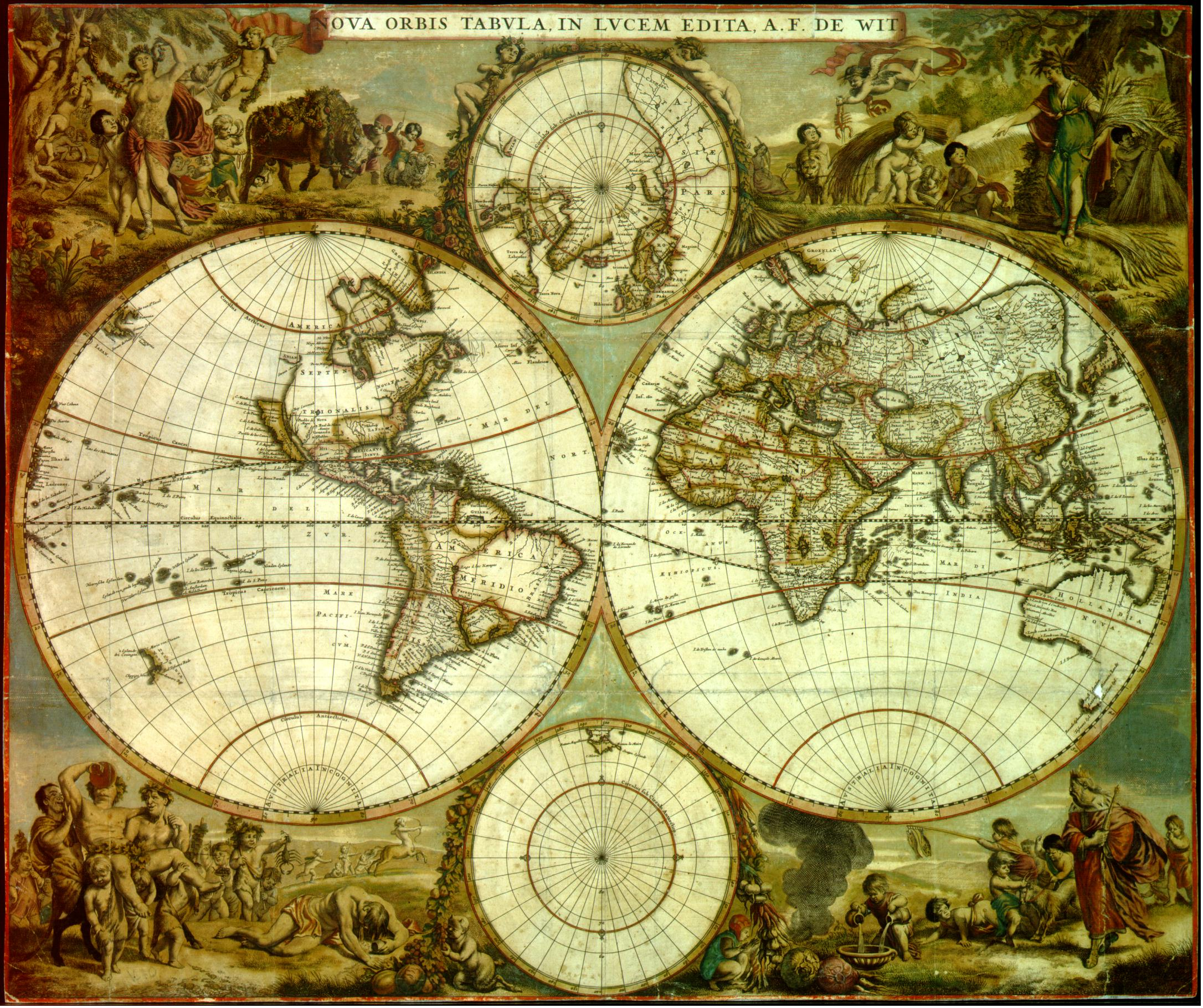
Nova Orbis Tabula in Lucem Edita is published by Dutch cartographer Frederik de Wit.

1662 (MDCLXII) was a common year starting on Sunday of the Gregorian calendar and a common year starting on Wednesday of the Julian calendar, the 1662nd year of the Common Era (CE) and Anno Domini (AD) designations, the 662nd year of the 2nd millennium, the 62nd year of the 17th century, and the 3rd year of the 1660s decade. As of the start of 1662, the Gregorian calendar was 10 days ahead of the Julian calendar, which remained in localized use until 1923.

== Events ==
=== January–March ===
- January 4 – Dziaddin Mukarram Shah becomes the new Sultan of Kedah, an independent kingdom on the Malay Peninsula, upon the death of his father, Sultan Muhyiddin Mansur.
- January 10 – At the age of 19, Louis Grimaldi becomes the new Prince of Monaco upon the death of his grandfather, Honoré II.
- January 14 – A Portuguese garrison invades Morocco and kidnaps 35 women and girls, then steals 400 head of cattle. The Moroccans counterattack and kill the garrison's commander, 12 knights and 38 other Portuguese soldiers before the surviving Portuguese are given sanctuary inside the English fortress at Tangier. A brief war ensues between England and Morocco.
- January 22 – Former Chinese Emperor Yongli, who had surrendered to General Wu Sangui in December, is put on a boat along with his sons and grandsons at Sagaing in Burma (at the time, Burma), leaving under the promise that they will be given safe passage elsewhere in Burma. Instead, the former Emperor is taken back to China and executed on June 1.
- January 23 – János Kemény, Prince of Transylvania for slightly more than a year, is killed during Transylvania's defeat by the Ottoman Empire in a battle at Nagyszőllős, now the city of Vynohradiv in Ukraine. An Ottoman appointee, Michael Apafi, replaces Kemény in September and the status of the principality of Transylvania (now part of Romania) is never regained.
- c. January – John Graunt, in one of the earliest uses of statistics, publishes statistical information about births and deaths in London.
- February 1 – Chinese general Koxinga (Zheng Chenggong) captures the Dutch East India Company's settlement at Fort Zeelandia (now Tainan) on the island of Taiwan after a nine-month siege, ending the company's rule on the island, then establishes the Kingdom of Tungning. In response, the Kangxi Emperor of the mainland Qing dynasty relocates all residents along the southern coast, by 50 miles.
- February 11 – A violent storm in the Indian Ocean strikes a fleet of seven ships of the Dutch East India Company (VOC) as they are traveling back to the Dutch Republic from Batavia in the Dutch East Indies (now Jakarta, Indonesia). Three of the freighters— Wapen van Holland, Gekroonde Leeuw and Prins Willem — are lost with all hands. The ships Vogel Phoenix, Maarsseveen and Prinses Royal make their way back to the Netherlands. The other ship, the freighter Arnhem remains afloat and its roughly 80 survivors are able to evacuate in boats to search for land.
- February 20 – The survivors of the wreck of the Dutch freighter Arnhem strike reefs but are able to make their way to an uninhabited island, probably the Ile D'Ambre or Ilot Fourneau both islands within the territory of Mauritius. During more than two months while shipwrecked, the survivors kill and eat the local wildlife, including the last surviving dodo. They are rescued by the English ship Truroe in May.
- March 18 – Carrosses à cinq sols, a short-lived experiment of the first public bus system (horse-drawn wagons holding eight passengers) begins in Paris as the idea of mathematician Blaise Pascal and financed by the Duc de Rouanez, with transportation to and from the Royal Square for the cost of five sous.

=== April–June ===
- April 19 – Three of the former members of the English Parliament who had signed the death warrant for Charles I of England in 1649 and then fled into exile in the Netherlands after the Restoration of the Monarchy in 1660 — Miles Corbet, John Okey and John Barkstead — are hanged after having been extradited, returned to England, and convicted of regicide. Their bodies are then drawn and quartered.
- April 22 – The Paugussett tribe, granted reservations in the British colony of Connecticut in North America, sell a large amount of tribal land to Captain Joseph Hawley including several towns in Fairfield County: Shelton, Trumbull, Derby and Monroe.
- April 24 – Chinese warlord Zheng Chenggong sends a message to the Spanish government of the Philippines demanding payment of tribute and threatening to send a fleet of ships to conquer the area. The message reaches the Spanish Governor-General on May 5, and preparations are made to resist the invasion.
- May 3 – John Winthrop the Younger, the son of the first governor of Massachusetts, is honored by being made a fellow of the Royal Society, England's new scientific society. Winthrop uses his election to the Society to gain access to the king, who grants him a new charter, uniting the colonies of Connecticut and New Haven.
- May 9 – Samuel Pepys witnesses a Punch and Judy show in London (the first on record).
- May 16 – The hearth tax is introduced in England and Wales.
- May 19
  - The Act of Uniformity 1662, officially "An Act for the uniformity of common prayer and service in the Church, and administration of the sacraments", is given royal assent after being passed by the English Parliament to regulate the form of public prayers, sacraments, and other rites of the Church of England to conform with the newest edition of the Book of Common Prayer, the 1662 prayer book.
  - Royal assent is also given to England's new hearth tax law, with one shilling charged for each stove or fireplace in a building, to be collected on 29 September and on 25 March each year in order to provide the £1,200,000 annual household income for King Charles II. The unpopular tax is abolished in 1689.
- May 21 – (May 31 N.S.); Princess Catherine of Braganza, daughter of King João IV of Portugal, marries Charles II of England. As part of the dowry, Portugal cedes Bombay in India, and Tangier in Morocco, to England.
- May 24 – Rioting in the Chinese section of Manila breaks out in the wake of calls to kill non-Christian Chinese residents of the Philippines, and the Spanish Army fires cannons at the rioting crowd. An order follows for non-Christian Chinese Filipinos to leave Manila, and for Christian Filipinos to register with the government. Boats begin transporting the non-Christians back to China
- May – The last credible report of a sighting of the dodo bird, now extinct, is made by Volkert Evertsz, a survivor of the shipwreck of the Dutch ship Arnhem, which struck reefs on February 12. The survivors had made their way in a small boat to Ile d'Ambre, an island in the Indian Ocean 200 kilometres (120 mi) northeast of Mauritius. When rescued by the English ship Truroe in May, Evertsz reports that he and his group had survived by eating the local wildlife, including the dodo.
- June 4 – The "Sangley Massacre" is ordered by Sabiniano Manrique de Lara, the Spanish Governor-General of the Philippines, with the directive for the government to kill all Filipinos of Chinese ancestry — Sangleys — who disobey orders to assemble at Manila for deportation.
- June 15 – The Matthews baronets British nobility title is created.
- June 21 – The Pierce baronets British nobility title is created.
- June 23 – Koxinga, who had founded the Kingdom of Tungning on the island of Taiwan a year earlier, names his successor while on his deathbed. He appoints his son, Zheng Jing, whom he had earlier ordered unsuccessfully to be executed, as the new King.

=== July–September ===
- July 15 – The Royal Society, founded by King Charles II of England and Scotland receives an official charter in London.
- August 20 – Ignatius Andrew Akijan is installed as the new Patriarch of the Syriac Catholic Church for Christians within the Muslim-ruled Ottoman Empire after his appointment is confirmed by the Sultan Mehmed IV.
- August 24 – The Act of Uniformity goes into effect on St Bartholomew's Day, making mandatory in the Church of England the forms of worship prescribed in the new edition of the Book of Common Prayer the deadline having been set for "every clergyman and every schoolmaster... to express, by August 24, his unfeigned consent to everything contained in the Book of Common Prayer. This is followed by the resignation of over 2,000 clergy who resign "for conscience sake". Those who refuse to take the required oath of conformity to the established church are subject to the Great Ejection from their jobs.
- September 9 – The Parliament of Scotland passes the Act of Indemnity and Oblivion, an amnesty (with numerous specific exceptions) for most political crimes committed by Scottish citizens during the years between January 1, 1637 (prior to the 1639 beginning of the Wars of the Three Kingdoms and before the restoration of the monarchy on September 16, 1660.
- September 29 – The first payments under England's hearth tax law, enacted on May 19, become due.

=== October–December ===
- October 19 – An English Buccaneer force led by Royal Navy commodore Christopher Myngs launches an attack on Santiago de Cuba.
- October 27 – Charles II of England sells Dunkirk to France, for £400,000 (2.5 million French livres).
- November 28 – The English Royal Society holds its first meeting.
- December 4 – The Purefoy baronets British nobility title is created.
- December 20 – Nicolas Fouquet is banished from France.
- December 26 – Molière's play, The School for Wives, is given its première in Paris.
- November - December – Helen Guthrie is the last person accused during the Forfar witch trials to be executed.

=== Date unknown ===
- Robert Boyle publishes Nova experimenta physico-mechanica in Oxford (2nd edition), setting forth the law bearing his name.
- Joan Blaeu publishes Atlas Maior, sive cosmographia Blaviana in Amsterdam (first complete edition, 11 volumes in Latin).
- Milton, Massachusetts is incorporated as a town.
- The Akademie der Bildenden Künste Nürnberg is founded in Germany.
- The last widely accepted sighting of a dodo, now extinct.

== Births ==
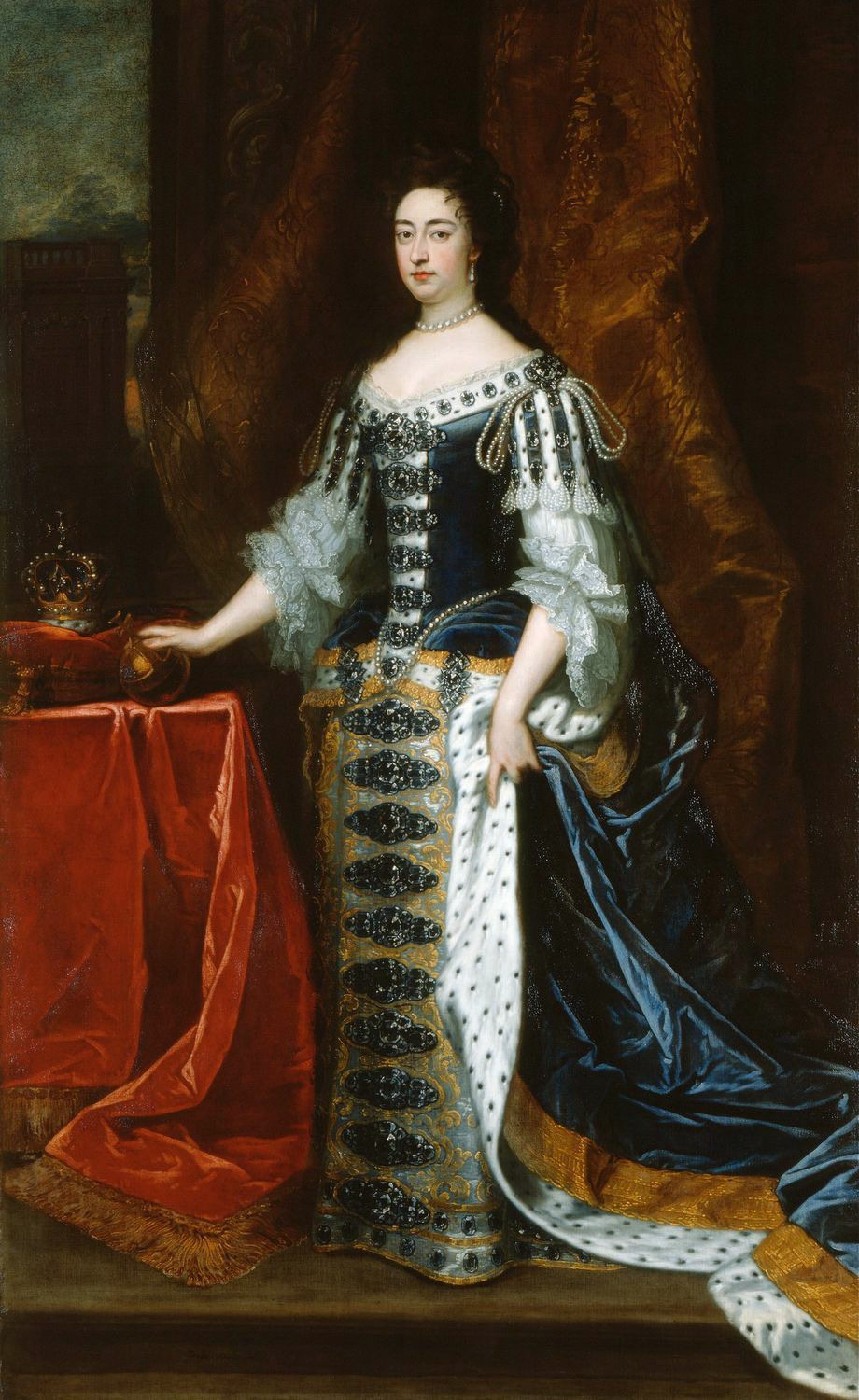
Mary II of England and Scotland

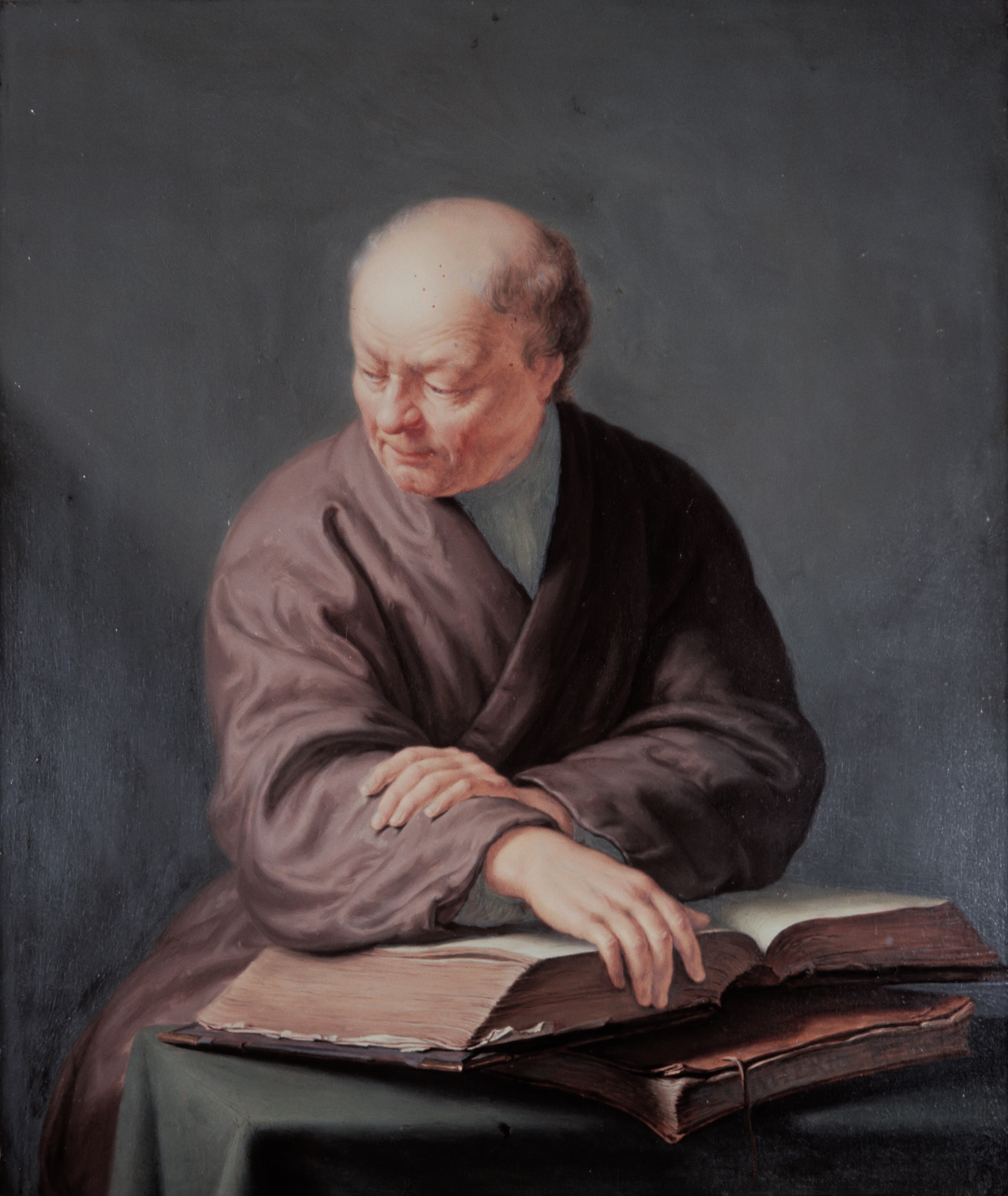
Willem van Mieris

- January 1 – Balaji Vishwanath, Peshwa of the Maratha Empire (d. 1720)
- January 4 – Jeanne Le Ber, religious recluse in New France (d. 1714)
- January 6 – Robert Sutton, 2nd Baron Lexinton, English diplomat (d. 1723)
- January 9 – John Holles, 1st Duke of Newcastle, England (d. 1711)
- January 12 – Samuel Shute, Governor of Massachusetts Bay and New Hampshire (d. 1742)
- January 17 – Françoise Pitel, French actor (d. 1721)
- January 25 – Luís da Cunha, Ambassador of Portugal (d. 1749)
- January 27 – Richard Bentley, English classical scholar (d. 1742)
- February 9 – Paolo de Matteis, Italian painter (d. 1728)
- February 15 – James Renwick, Scottish minister and Covenanter martyr (d. 1688)
- March 1 – Giovanni Carlo Aliberti, Italian painter (d. 1740)
- March 8 – Augustus William, Duke of Brunswick-Lüneburg (d. 1731)
- March 9 – Franz Anton von Sporck, German noble (d. 1738)
- March 10 – Francis Pierrepont, English politician (d. 1693)
- March 15 – Gabriel Álvarez de Toledo, Royal Librarian of King Felipe V of Spain (d. 1714)
- March 19 – Johann, Count of Leiningen-Dagsburg-Falkenburg (d. 1698)
- March 20 – Giuseppe Averani, Italian jurist and naturalist (d. 1738)
- March 29 – Tsarevna Feodosia Alekseyevna of Russia, daughter of Tsar Alexis of Russia (d. 1713)
- April 9
  - William Conolly, Irish politician (d. 1729)
  - Edward Hawarden, English Catholic theologian (d. 1735)
- April 11 – Countess Louise Sophie of Hanau-Lichtenberg (d. 1751)
- April 13 – Princess Eleonore Erdmuthe of Saxe-Eisenach, Electress of Saxony (d. 1696)
- April 26
  - Francisco Bances Candamo, Spanish playwright (d. 1704)
  - Marie Louise d'Orléans, queen consort of Spain (d. 1689)
- April 30 – Mary II of England, Scotland and Ireland, queen regnant (d. 1694)
- May 3 – Matthäus Daniel Pöppelmann, German architect (d. 1737)
- May 18 – George Smalridge, English Bishop of Bristol (d. 1719)
- June 3 – Willem van Mieris, Dutch painter (d. 1747)
- June 6 – Mannus Riedesel, German architect (d. 1726)
- June 7 – Celia Fiennes, English travel writer (d. 1741)
- June 11 – Tokugawa Ienobu, Japanese Edo shōgun (d. 1712)
- June 18 – Charles FitzRoy, 2nd Duke of Cleveland, illegitimate son of Charles II of England, courtier (d. 1730)
- July 1
  - Béatrice Hiéronyme de Lorraine, Abbess of Remiremont (d. 1738)
  - John Dolben, English politician (d. 1710)
- July 11 – Maximilian II Emanuel, Elector of Bavaria (d. 1726)
- July 20 – Andrea Brustolon, Italian artist (d. 1732)
- August 3 – Countess Sophie Henriette of Waldeck, Duchess of Saxe-Hildburghausen (d. 1702)
- August 5 – James Anderson, Scottish historian (d. 1728)
- August 10 – Charles Boit, Swedish enameller, miniature painter (d. 1727)
- August 13 – Charles Seymour, 6th Duke of Somerset, English politician (d. 1748)
- August 25 – John Leverett the Younger, Massachusetts colonial judge; president of Harvard (d. 1724)
- August 28 – Maria Aurora von Königsmarck, Swedish noblewoman of Brandenburg extraction (d. 1728)
- August 29 – Sebastiano Mocenigo, Doge of Venice (d. 1732)
- September 1 – Louis de Carrières, French priest and Bible commentator (d. 1717)
- September 19 – Jean-Paul Bignon, French priest and man of letters (d. 1743)
- October 3 – Alessandro, Marquis de Maffei, Italian Lieutenant General of Infantry in Bavarian service (d. 1730)
- October 6 – William Walsh, English poet, correspondent and British Member of Parliament (d. 1708)
- October 14 – William Fairfield, Massachusetts Speaker of the House of Deputies (d. 1742)
- October 17 – Arthur Rawdon, English Member of Parliament (d. 1695)
- October 18 – Matthew Henry, English Bible commentator, Presbyterian minister (d. 1714)
- October 19 – William Ernest, Duke of Saxe-Weimar (d. 1728)
- November 2 – Johan Cronman, Swedish general (d. 1737)
- November 7 – Pierre Fatio, Swiss politician (d. 1707)
- November 11
  - John Chesshyre, English lawyer (d. 1738)
  - Alexander Pendarves, English politician (d. 1726)
- November 12 – Francesco Barberini, Italian Catholic cardinal (d. 1738)
- November 19 – John Campbell, 2nd Earl of Breadalbane and Holland, Scottish politician (d. 1752)
- November 29 – Heinrich X, Count of Reuss-Ebersdorf (d. 1711)
- November 30 – Luis Antonio Belluga y Moncada, Spanish Catholic cardinal (d. 1743)
- December 13 – Francesco Bianchini, Italian philosopher and scientist (d. 1729)
- December 17 – Samuel Wesley, English poet, father of the Wesley brothers (d. 1735)
- December 18 – James Douglas, 2nd Duke of Queensberry, Scottish politician (d. 1711)
- December 24 – Adam Zrinski, Croatian count and military officer (d. 1691)

== Deaths ==
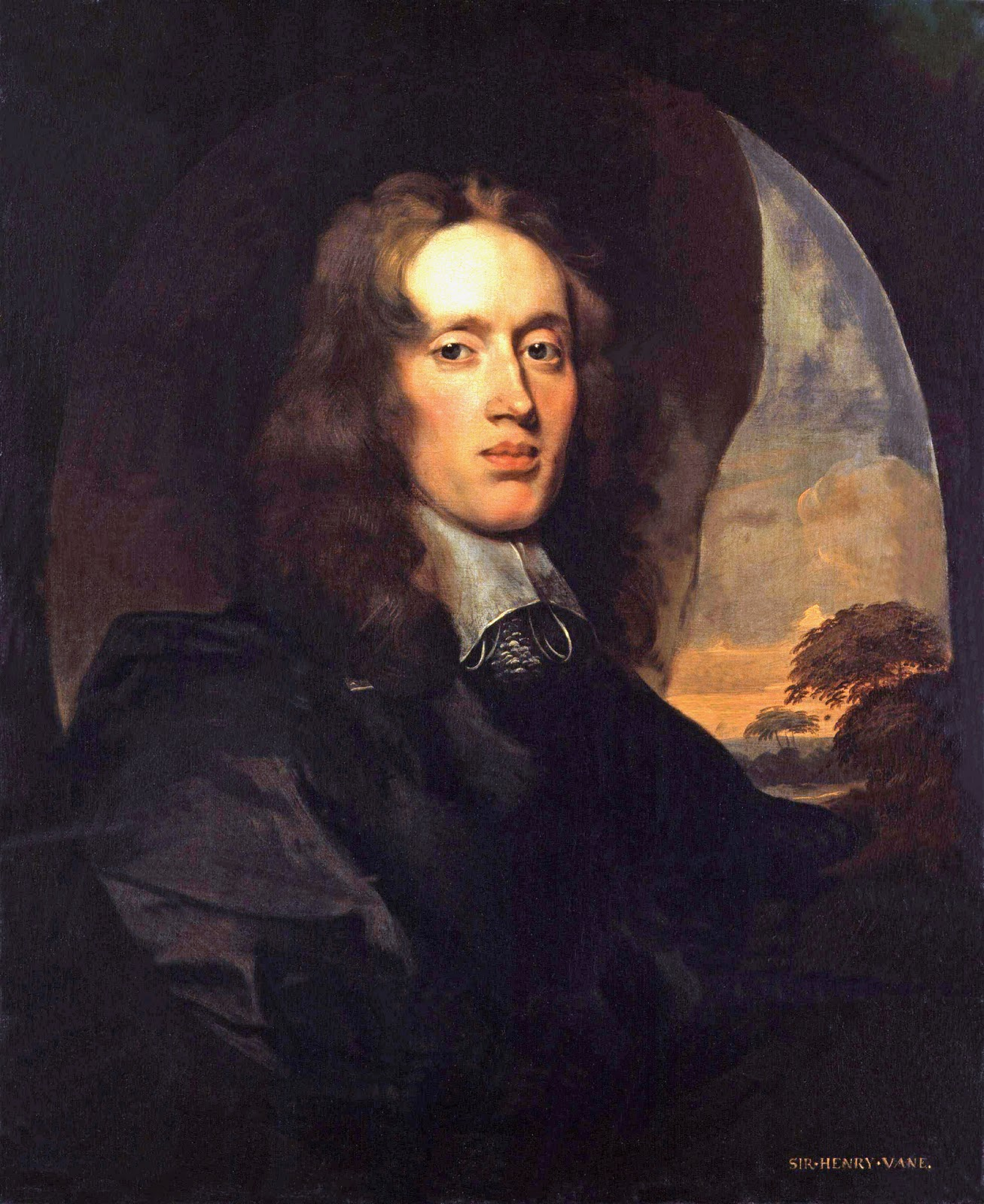
Henry Vane the Younger

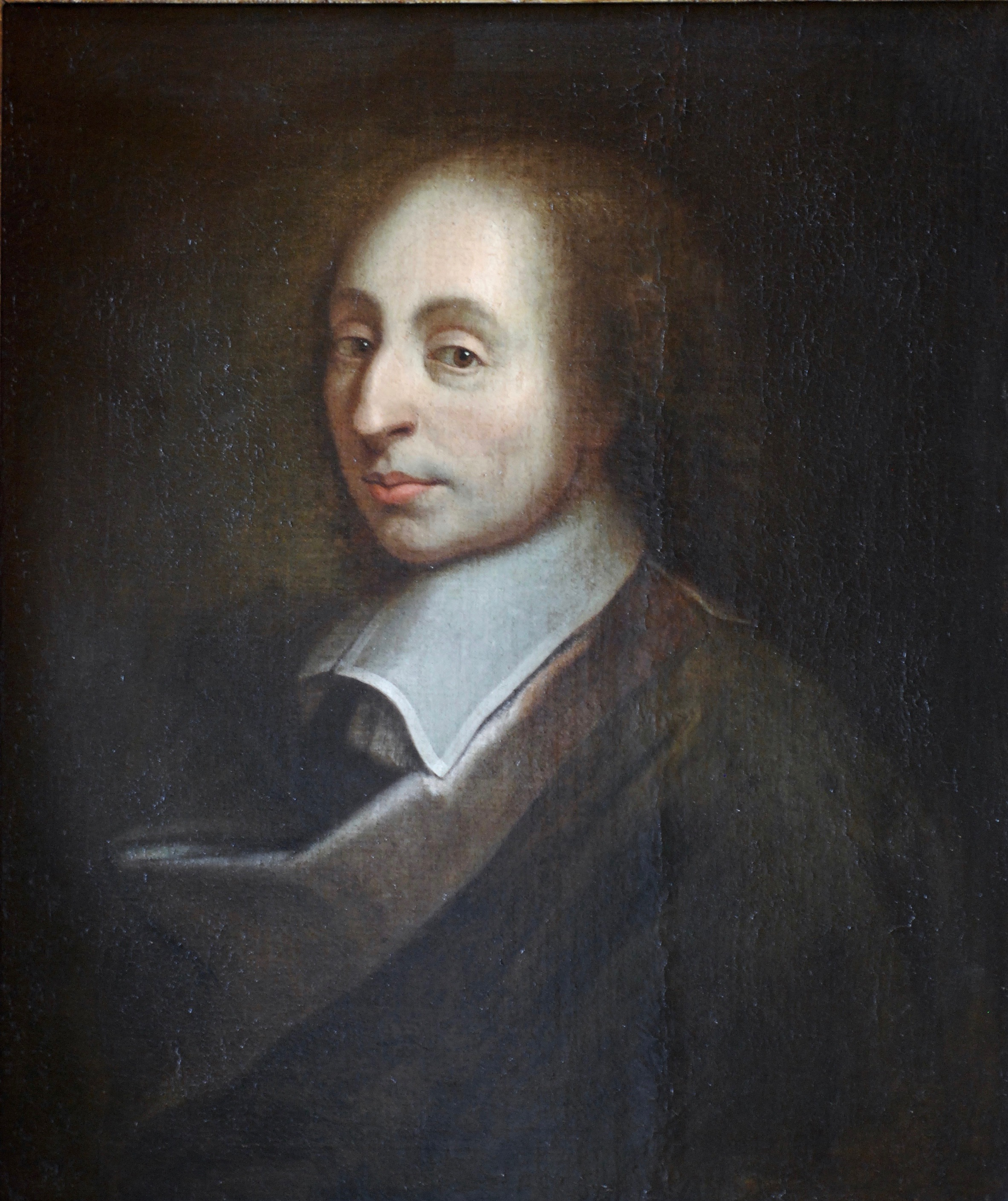
Blaise Pascal

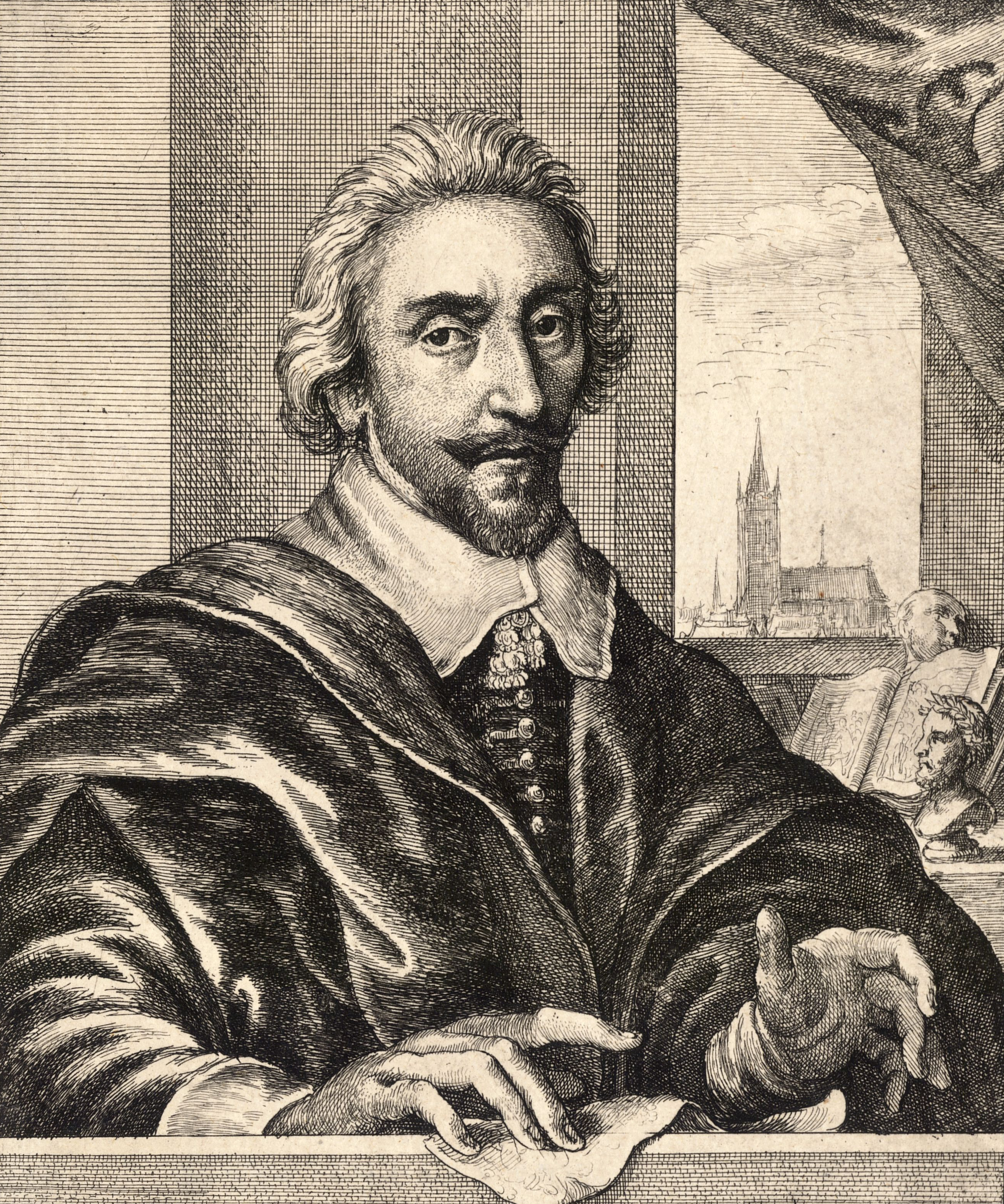
Adriaen van de Venne

- January 6 – Sir Francis Drake, 2nd Baronet, English Member of Parliament (b. 1617)
- January 10 – Honoré II of Monaco (b. 1597)
- January 13 – Christian Keymann, German hymnwriter (b. 1607)
- January 22 – Henry Lingen, English politician (b. 1612)
- January 23 – John Kemény, Prince of Transylvania (b. 1607)
- February 9 – Judith Quiney, English daughter of William Shakespeare (b. 1585)
- February 13
  - Elizabeth Stuart, Queen of Bohemia (b. 1596)
  - Carlo I Cybo-Malaspina, marquisate of Massa (b. 1581)
- February 21
  - John Stawell, English Member of Parliament (b. 1600)
  - Joris Jansen Rapelje, Early Dutch settler in colonial North America (b. 1604)
- February 23 – Johann Crüger, German composer of well-known hymns (b. 1598)
- March 10 – Samuel Hartlib, British scholar (b. 1600)
- March 17 – Jerome Weston, 2nd Earl of Portland (b. 1605)
- March 20 – François le Métel de Boisrobert, French poet (b. 1592)
- April 14 – William Fiennes, 1st Viscount Saye and Sele, English statesman (b. 1582)
- April 8
  - Albert d'Orville, Jesuit priest and missionary, cartographer (b. 1621)
  - Birgitte Thott, Danish scholar, writer and translator (b. 1610)
- April 22 – John Tradescant the Younger, English botanist (b. 1608)
- April 24 – Elizabeth Ribbing, Swedish noble (b. 1596)
- May 7 – Lucrezia Orsina Vizzana, Italian singer and composer (b. 1590)
- May 8 – Peter Heylin, English ecclesiastic and author of many polemical works (b. 1599)
- May 16 – John Ley, English priest (b. 1583)
- May 17
  - Abraham de Fabert, Marshal of France (b. 1599)
  - William, Duke of Saxe-Weimar, German nobleman (b. 1598)
- May 18 – Adam Billaut, French poet, carpenter (b. 1602)
- May 23 – John Gauden, English bishop and writer (b. 1605)
- May 28 – Robert Douglas, Count of Skenninge, Swedish field marshal (b. 1611)
- June 1 – Zhu Youlang, the 4th and last emperor of the Southern Ming dynasty of China (b. 1623)
- June 14 – Henry Vane the Younger, British Governor of Massachusetts (b. 1613)
- June 23 – Koxinga, Chinese military leader (b. 1624)
- June 29 – Pierre de Marca, French bishop and historian (b. 1594)
- July 3 – Pierre Chanut, French diplomat (b. 1601)
- July 12 – Louis Henry, Prince of Nassau-Dillenburg, military leader in the Thirty Years' War (b. 1594)
- July 14 – Camilla Faà, secret wife of the Duke of Mantua (b. c. 1599)
- July 16 – Alfonso IV d'Este, Duke of Modena (b. 1634)
- July 30 – Klas Hansson Bjelkenstjerna, Swedish naval officer and civil servant (b. 1615)
- August 8 – Angelo Giori, Italian Catholic cardinal (b. 1586)
- August 14 – Christina Magdalena of the Palatinate-Zweibrücken, Swedish Princess (b. 1616)
- August 16 – Ignace Cotolendi, French bishop (b. 1630)
- August 19 – Blaise Pascal, French mathematician, physicist, and philosopher (b. 1623)
- September 3 – William Lenthall, English politician (b. 1591)
- September 21 – Adriaen van Stalbemt, Flemish Baroque painter (b. 1580)
- September 22 – John Biddle, English theologian (b. 1615)
- October 21 – Henry Lawes, English composer (b. 1595)
- October 29 – William Pynchon, English colonist and fur trader in North America (b. 1590)
- November 12 – Adriaen van de Venne, Dutch painter (b. 1589)
- November 15 – Hugh Audley, English lawyer and philosopher (b. 1577)
- November 20 – Archduke Leopold Wilhelm of Austria, Governor of the Spanish Netherlands (b. 1614)
- December 3 – William Dugard, English printer (b. 1606)
- December 5 – Isidoro Bianchi, Italian painter (b. 1581)
- December 20 – Axel Lillie, Swedish politician (b. 1603)
- December 30 – Ferdinand Charles, Archduke of Austria, regent of the Tyrol and Further Austria (b. 1628)
