= Siege of Dundee =

1651 siege and storm of a Scottish town

Coordinates: 56.46°N 2.97°W

- Part of the Anglo-Scottish war
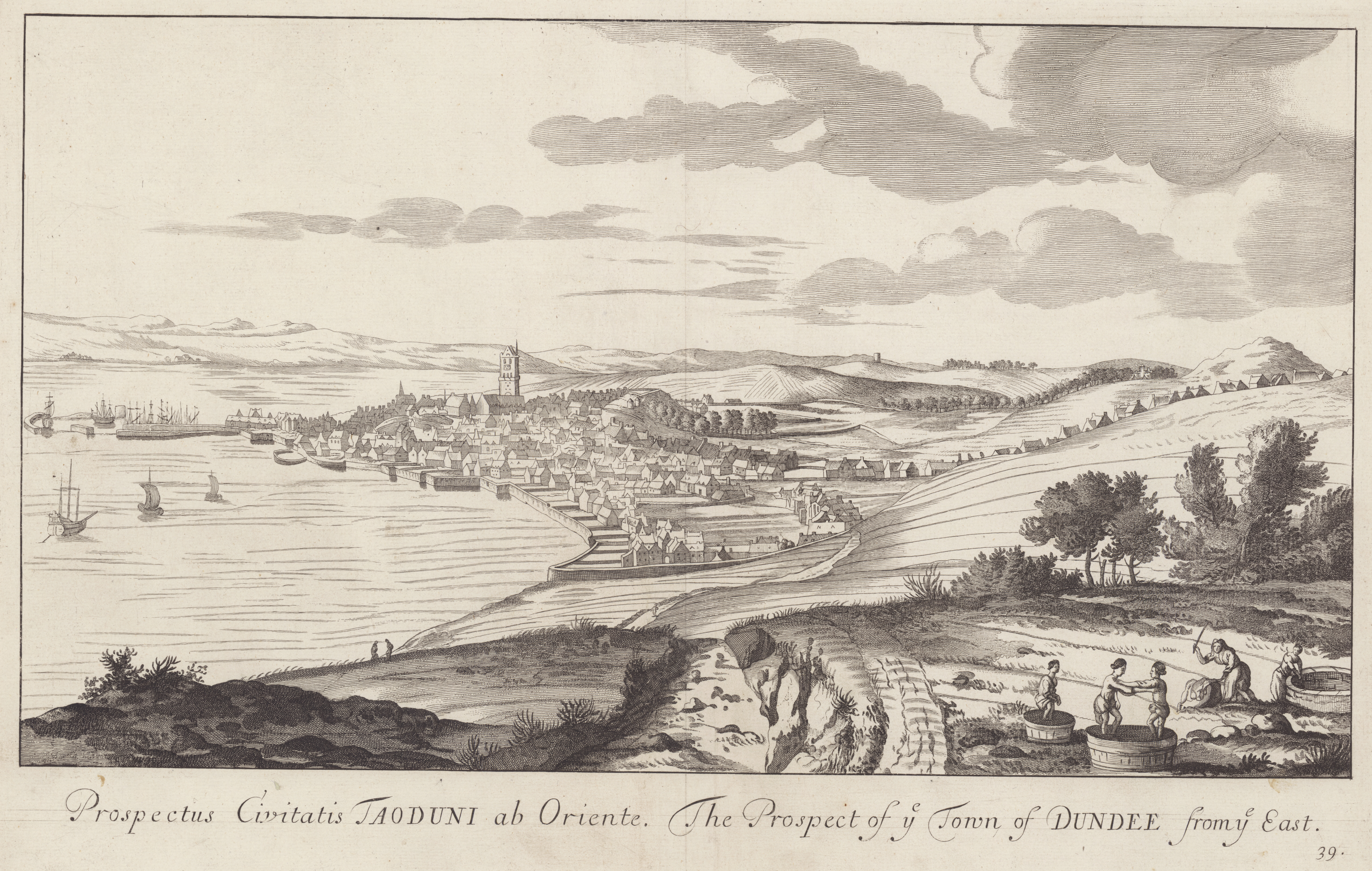
- Engraving of Dundee, c. 1693
Date	23 August to 1 September 1651
Location	Dundee, Scotland
Result	English victory

Belligerents
Scotland	England

Commanders and leaders
Robert Lumsden †	George Monck; Colonel John Okey

Strength
500 or more	Unknown

Casualties and losses
100–1,000 killed, including some civilians 200 captured	Unknown

The siege of Dundee, 23 August to 1 September 1651, took place during the 1650 to 1652 Anglo-Scottish war. After a two-day artillery bombardment, a Covenanter garrison under Robert Lumsden surrendered to Commonwealth of England forces commanded by George Monck.

Shortly afterwards, Aberdeen also surrendered, effectively ending resistance in Scotland, while Oliver Cromwell's victory at Worcester concluded the Wars of the Three Kingdoms. The Covenanter government was dissolved and Scotland absorbed into the Commonwealth, where it remained until the 1660 Stuart Restoration.

== Background ==
Attempts by Charles I to impose religious reforms on the Church of Scotland culminated in the 1639 and 1640 Bishops' Wars. His defeat led to the establishment of a Covenanter government in Scotland, and forced Charles to recall the Parliament of England in November 1640. The breakdown of this relationship resulted in the outbreak of the First English Civil War in August 1642.

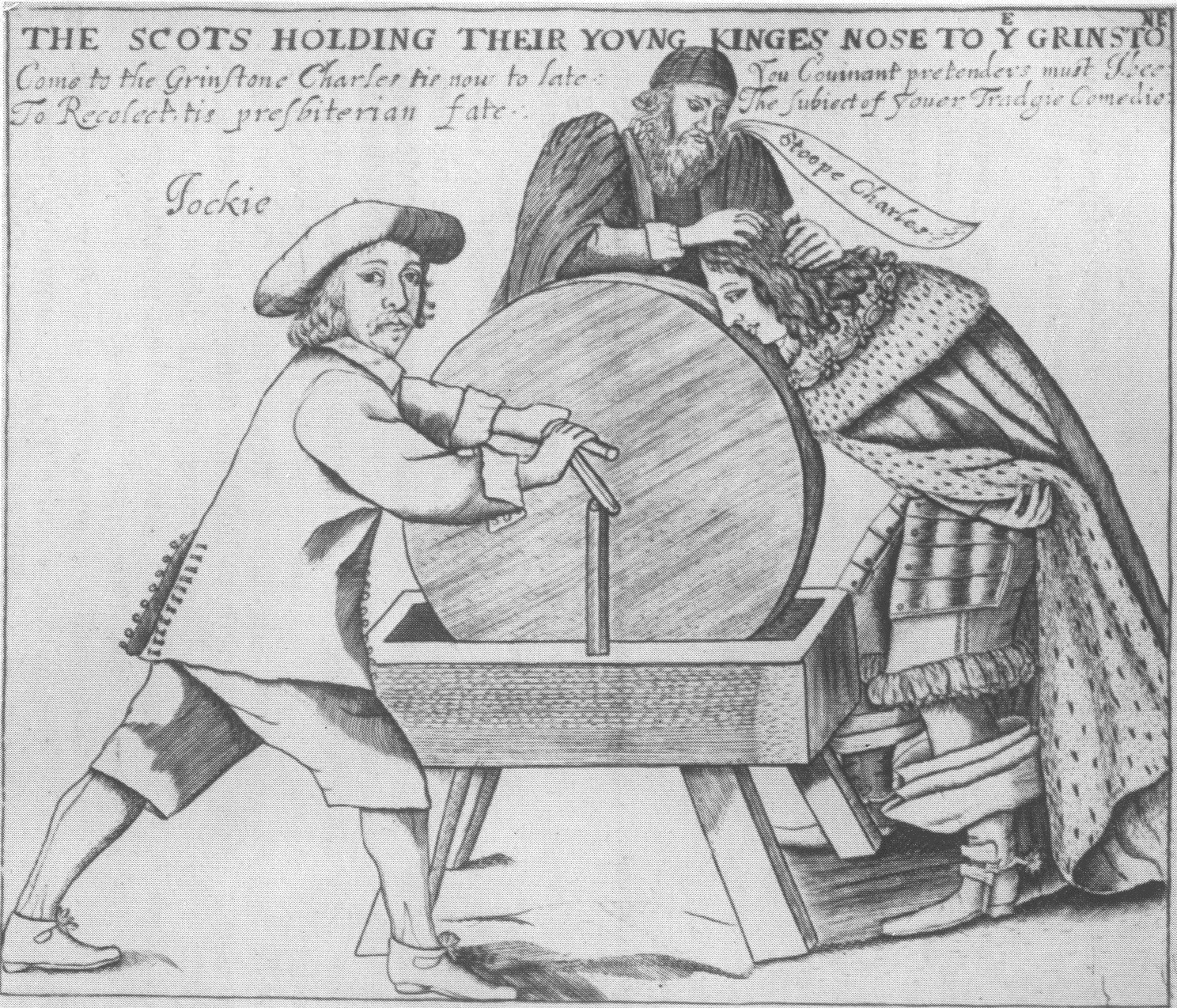
A contemporary English view of the Scots imposing conditions on Charles II in return for their support

In England, the Royalists faced a Parliamentarian-Scottish alliance, bound by the 1643 Solemn League and Covenant. In 1646, Charles surrendered to the Scots, hoping they would give him better terms than his English opponents. After several months of fruitless negotiations, the Scots handed him over to Parliament in exchange for a financial settlement, and their troops returned home on 3 February 1647.

Exasperated by Charles's intransigence and renewed outbreak of fighting in the 1648 Second English Civil War, leaders of the New Model Army decided to have the king tried for treason. To achieve this, Pride's Purge in December 1648 removed those MPs who opposed it. The so-called Rump Parliament then approved the Execution of Charles I on 30 January 1649, establishing the republican Commonwealth.

The Covenanter government had not been consulted prior to Charles' execution, and immediately proclaimed his son Charles II, King of Britain. Initially reluctant to accept Scottish support, after his Irish backers had been defeated in the 1649 to 1651 Cromwellian conquest of Ireland, Charles accepted their terms. These included an undertaking to restore him to the English throne, and the Scots began recruiting an army to achieve this, led by the experienced David Leslie.

== English invasion of Scotland ==
Location of several places mentioned in the text shown on a map of southern Scotland

The Commonwealth reacted to news of Scottish preparations by ordering Oliver Cromwell to lead a pre-emptive strike. On 22 July 1650, elements of the New Model Army crossed the Tweed into Scotland, starting the Anglo-Scottish war (1650–1652). Cromwell manoeuvred around Edinburgh, attempting to bring the Scots to battle, but Leslie refused to be drawn out, and on 31 August the English withdrew to Dunbar.

Believing his opponent was trapped, and under pressure to finish him off, Leslie prepared to assault Dunbar. However, on the night of 2/3 September, Cromwell launched a pre-dawn attack against the Scottish right. The resulting Battle of Dunbar remained in the balance until Cromwell personally led his cavalry reserve in a flank attack on the two Scottish infantry brigades which had managed to come to grips with the English and rolled up the Scottish line. Leslie executed a fighting withdrawal, but out of a force of 12,000, he lost around 1,500 killed or wounded, with another 6,000 taken prisoner.

Leslie sought to rally what remained of his army, and build a new defensive line at Stirling. This was a narrow choke point which blocked access to north-east Scotland, the major source of supplies and recruits for the Scots. There he was joined by the bulk of the government, clergy, and Edinburgh's mercantile elite. On 1 January 1651 Charles was formally crowned at Scone. After six months of manoeuvring an English force of 1,600 men under Colonel Robert Overton succeeded in crossing the Firth of Forth and established a beachhead near Inverkeithing on 17 July. On 20 July the Scots, more than 4,000 strong and commanded by Major-general James Holborne advanced against the English, now reinforced to approximately 4,000 men and commanded by Major-general John Lambert. In the Battle of Inverkeithing the Scottish cavalry were routed and when the previously unengaged Scottish infantry attempted to retreat, they suffered many losses in the ensuing pursuit.

== Prelude ==
After the battle, Lambert marched 6 miles (10 km) east and occupied the deep-water port of Burntisland and Cromwell shipped most of the English army there. Realising this left open the way into England for the Scots, Cromwell issued contingency orders as to what measures to take if this were to occur. He then ignored the Scottish army at Stirling and on 31 July marched on the seat of the Scottish government at Perth, which he besieged. Perth surrendered after two days, cutting off the Scottish army from reinforcements, provisions and materiel. In desperation Charles and Leslie decided that their only chance was to invade England in the hope that the populace would rise to support the King and so took their army south. Cromwell and Lambert followed, shadowing the Scottish army, while leaving General George Monck with more than 5,000 of the least experienced men to mop up what Scottish resistance remained.

Monck marched on Stirling, arriving on 6 August, and the town surrendered. After being subjected to plunging fire from the English artillery, Stirling Castle followed suit on 14 August. Monck detached 1,400 men under Colonel John Okey to subdue western Scotland and marched back through Perth towards Dundee, one of the last three significant Scottish fortifications holding out; the others were Aberdeen and St Andrews.

== Siege and assault ==
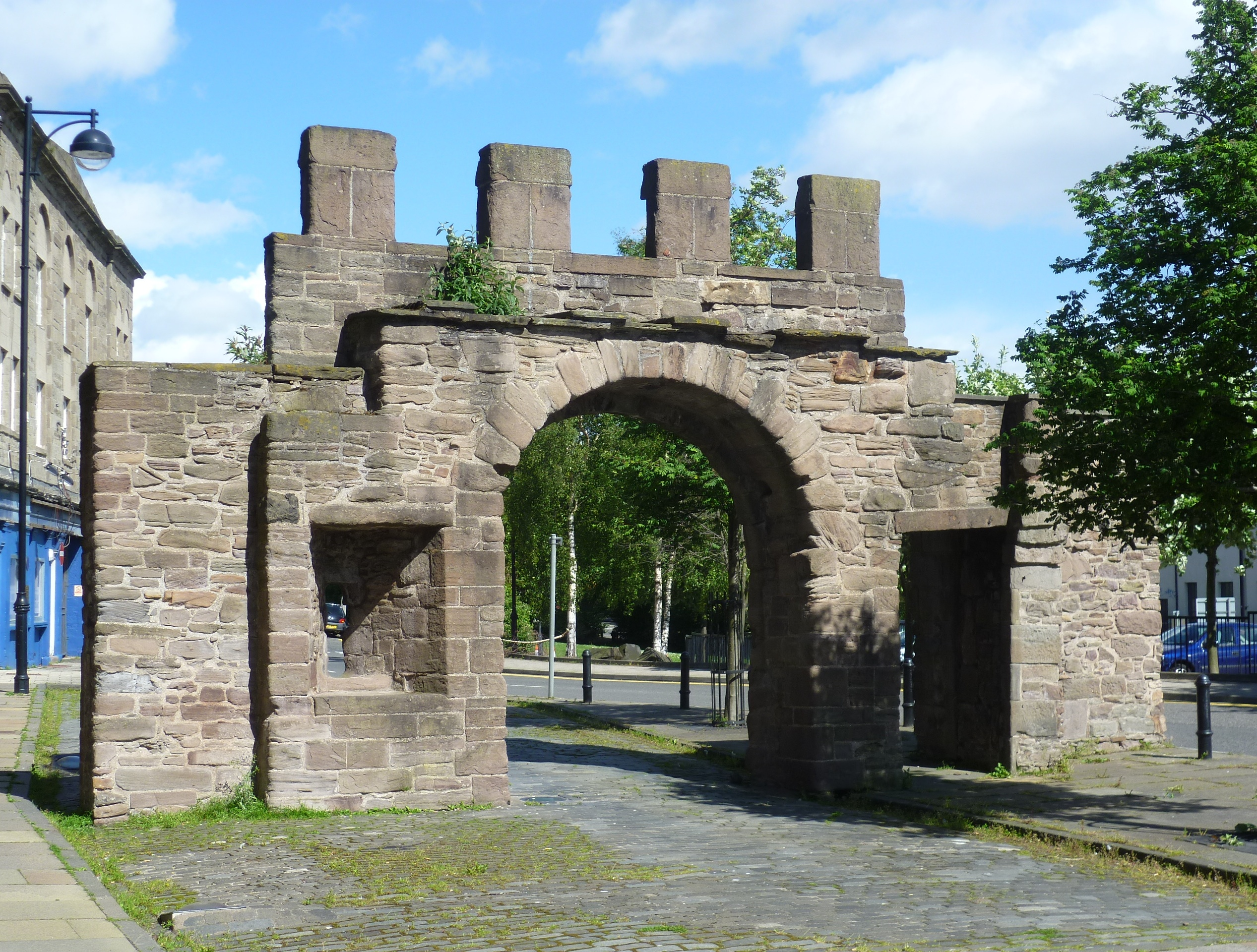
East Port, Dundee

Dundee was a walled town, but its defences were outdated, the most recent being from the 16th century. The town had been easily captured by a Royalist force under James Graham, Marquess of Montrose, in 1645. Nevertheless, the town's walled status and its garrison of at least 500 men meant many Scots deposited money and valuables there, to keep them safe from the English. The town was crowded with Scots who had fled from the English, some from as far away as Edinburgh. Monck drew up his army outside the town on 23 August and demanded its surrender. The town's governor, Robert Lumsden, believing the town walls and the local militia strong enough to withstand the English, refused.

When the Scottish Parliament was not sitting, authority in Scotland was exerted by the Committee of Estates. With the capture of Perth by Cromwell this body, dominated by militant Covenanters, endeavoured to assemble a fresh army in Angus. On 28 August a regiment of English cavalry commanded by Colonel Matthew Alured surprised 5,000 Scots at Alyth, 15 miles (24 km) north of Dundee, scattered them and took prisoner all of the members of the Committee of Estates. On 30 August St Andrews also surrendered.

Poor weather conditions delayed the start of the English artillery bombardment of Dundee. On 30 August the weather cleared and Monck again summoned the Governor to surrender the town and was again refused. Infuriated at having to risk his men's lives with an assault when the war was all but over, Monck gave permission for the town to be sacked once it was captured.

Two days after their artillery opened fire, the English stormed the west and east ports (gates) on the morning of 1 September. By noon they had broken into the town and proceeded to thoroughly sack it; several hundred civilians, including women and children, were killed, as was Lumsden. Monck admitted to 500 Scots killed; modern estimates range from 100 to as high as 1,000. Some 200 prisoners were taken. Monck allowed the army 24 hours to pillage and as well as the loss of life a large amount of booty was taken. Some individual soldiers seized small fortunes. As the town had refused an offer to surrender peacefully and consequently been taken by assault these actions were not breaches of the rules of war at the time, although they were considered unusually fierce. Subsequently, the usual strict military discipline of the New Model Army was reimposed. Dundee took over a century to recover economically from the sack.

== Aftermath ==
Shortly after the capture of Dundee, Aberdeen, whose council saw no benefit in resisting an inevitable and costly defeat, surrendered to a party of Monck's cavalry. A few isolated strongholds, including the Bass Rock, Dumbarton Castle and Dunnottar Castle near Stonehaven, held out into 1652, but the English forces were able to advance as far north as Orkney without significant opposition. Meanwhile the Scots under Charles and Leslie had penetrated into England as far as Worcester. There the stronger English army, which was better trained, better equipped and better supplied, cut the Scots' line of retreat. On 3 September, two days after the storming of Dundee, the English attacked from the south and decisively defeated the Scots. Charles was one of the few to escape capture.

The Battle of Worcester marked the end of the Wars of the Three Kingdoms. The defeated Scottish Government was dissolved, and the English Commonwealth absorbed the Kingdom of Scotland into the Commonwealth. Military rule was imposed, with 10,000 English troops garrisoned across the country to quell the threat of local uprisings. Negotiations between commissioners of the English Parliament and the deputies of Scotland's shires and burghs began to formalise the incorporation of Scottish legal and political structures into the new British state. By 1653 two Scottish representatives were invited to take seats in the English Barebone's Parliament. In 1660 Monck, who was now governor of Scotland, marched south with his army, entered London and called new parliamentary elections. These resulted in the Convention Parliament which on 8 May 1660 declared that Charles II had reigned as the lawful monarch since the execution of Charles I. Charles returned from exile and was crowned King of England on 23 April 1661, twelve years after being crowned by the Scots at Scone, completing the Restoration.

== Sources ==
- Atkin, Malcolm (2004). Worcestershire under arms. Barnsley: Pen and Sword. ISBN 1-84415-072-0. OL 11908594M.
- Brooks, Richard (2005). Cassell's Battlefields of Britain and Ireland. London: Weidenfeld & Nicolson. ISBN 978-0-304-36333-9.
- Coward, Barry (2003). The Stuart Age: England 1603–1714. Harlow: Pearson Education Ltd. ISBN 978-0-582-77251-9.
- Dow, F.D. (1979). Cromwellian Scotland 1651-1660. Edinburgh: John Donald Publishers. ISBN 978-0-85976-049-2.
- Edwards, Peter (2002). "Logistics and Supply". In Kenyon, John & Ohlmeyer, Jane (eds.). The Civil Wars: A Military History of England, Scotland and Ireland 1638–1660. Oxford: Oxford University Press. pp. 234–271. ISBN 978-0-19-280278-1.
- Firth, Charles Harding (1885–1900). "Monck, George". Dictionary of National Biography, 1885-1900. Vol. 38. London: Smith, Elder. OCLC 599795377.
- Furgol, Edward (2002). "The Civil Wars in Scotland". In Kenyon, John & Ohlmeyer, Jane (eds.). The Civil Wars: A Military History of England, Scotland and Ireland 1638–1660. Oxford: Oxford University Press. pp. 41–72. ISBN 978-0-19-280278-1.
- Gentles, Ian (2002). "The Civil Wars in England". In Kenyon, John & Ohlmeyer, Jane (eds.). The Civil Wars: A Military History of England, Scotland and Ireland 1638–1660. Oxford: Oxford University Press. pp. 103–154. ISBN 978-0-19-280278-1.
- Chisholm, Hugh, ed. (1911). "Dundee" . Encyclopædia Britannica. Vol. 8 (11th ed.). Cambridge University Press. p. 676. OCLC 14004298
- Hutton, Ronald & Reeves, Wiley (2002). "Sieges and Fortifications". In Kenyon, John & Ohlmeyer, Jane (eds.). The Civil Wars: A Military History of England, Scotland and Ireland 1638–1660. Oxford: Oxford University Press. pp. 195–233. ISBN 978-0-19-280278-1.
- Jones, S. J. (1948). "Dundee: A Scottish City Study". Yearbook of the Association of Pacific Coast Geographers. 10. University of Hawai'i Press: 10–25. doi:10.1353/pcg.1948.0001. JSTOR 24042154. S2CID 129922613.
- Keeble, N. H. (2002). The Restoration: England in the 1660s. Oxford: Blackwell. ISBN 978-0-631-19574-0.
- Kenyon, John & Ohlmeyer, Jane (2002). "The Background to the Civil Wars in the Stuart Kingdoms". In Kenyon, John & Ohlmeyer, Jane (eds.). The Civil Wars: A Military History of England, Scotland and Ireland 1638–1660. Oxford: Oxford University Press. pp. 3–40. ISBN 978-0-19-280278-1.
- Lodge, Richard (1969), The History of England – From the Restoration to the Death of William III (1660–1702), New York: Greenwood, OCLC 59117818
- MacKenzie, Kirsteen (2009). "Oliver Cromwell and the Solemn League and Covenant of the Three Kingdoms". In Patrick Little (ed.). Oliver Cromwell: New Perspectives. Basingstoke: Palgrave Macmillan. ISBN 978-0-230-57421-2.
- Ohlmeyer, Jane (2002). "The Civil Wars in Ireland". In Kenyon, John & Ohlmeyer, Jane (eds.). The Civil Wars: A Military History of England, Scotland and Ireland 1638–1660. Oxford: Oxford University Press. pp. 73–102. ISBN 978-0-19-280278-1.
- Reese, Peter (2006). Cromwell's Masterstroke: The Battle of Dunbar 1650. Barnsley: Pen & Sword. ISBN 978-1-84415-179-0.
- Reid, Stuart (2008) [2004]. Dunbar 1650: Cromwell's Most Famous Victory. Oxford: Osprey Publishing. ISBN 978-1-84176-774-1.
- Rodger, N.A.M. (2004). The Safeguard of the Sea. London: Penguin. ISBN 978-0-14-029724-9.
- Royle, Trevor (2005) [2004]. Civil War: The Wars of the Three Kingdoms, 1638–1660. London: Abacus. ISBN 978-0-349-11564-1.
- Stewart, Laura A. M. (2017). "Cromwell and the Scots". In Mills, Jane A. (ed.). Cromwell's Legacy. Manchester: Manchester University Press. pp. 171–190. ISBN 978-0-7190-8090-6.
- Stewart, Laura A. M. (2020). Union, Revolution and War: Scotland 1625–1745. The New History of Scotland. Edinburgh: Edinburgh University Press. ISBN 978-1-4744-1015-1.
- Wanklyn, Malcolm (2019). Parliament's Generals: Supreme Command and Politics During the British Wars 1642–51. Barnsley: Pen & Sword. ISBN 978-1-47389-836-3.
- Wheeler, James Scott (2002). The Irish and British Wars 1637-1654:Triumph, Tragedy and Failure. London: Routledge. ISBN 978-0-415-221320.
- Woolrych, Austin (2002). Britain in Revolution 1625–1660. Oxford: Oxford University Press. ISBN 978-0-19-820081-9.
