= Regicide =

Intentional killing of a monarch

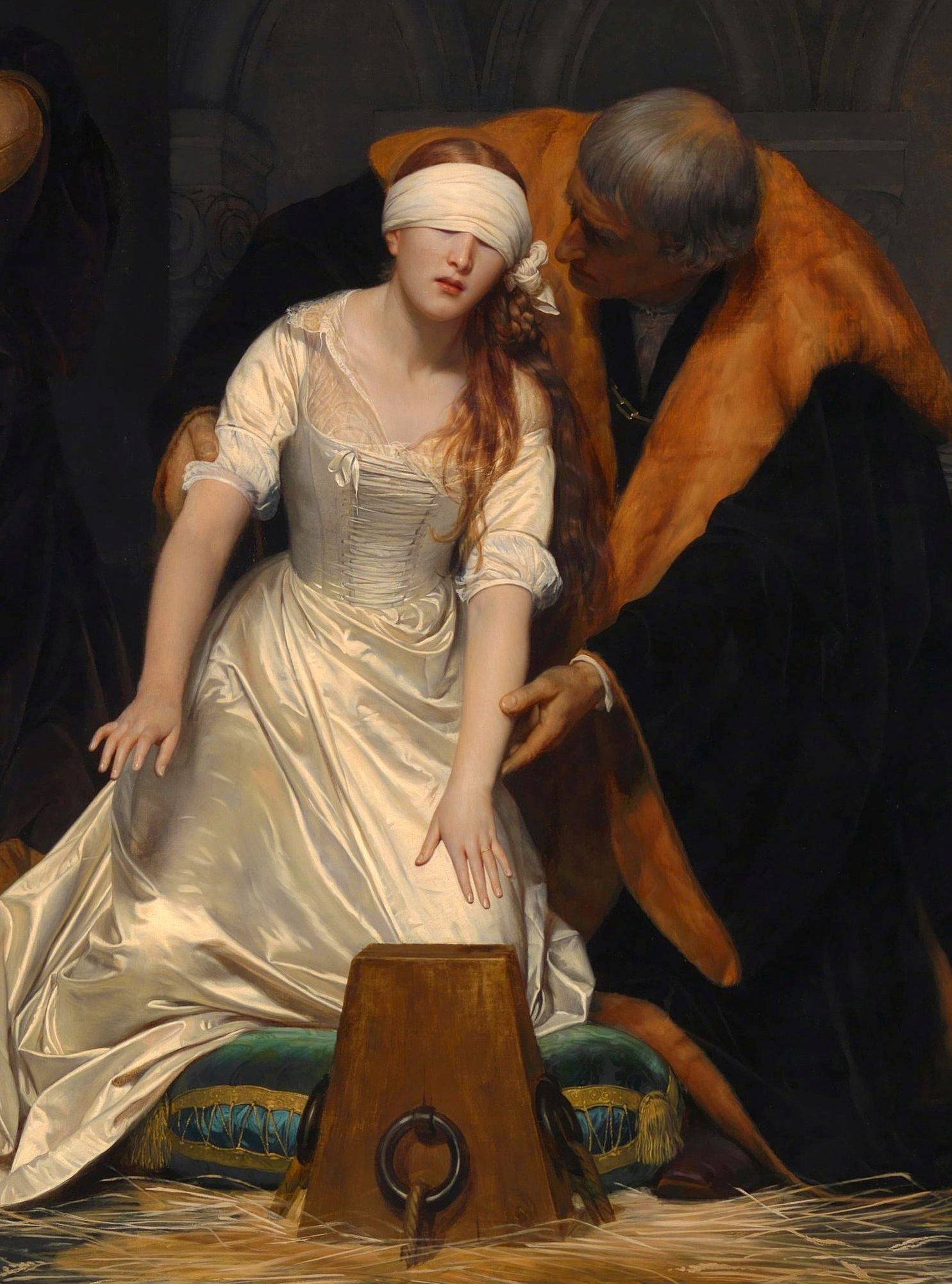
The Execution of Lady Jane Grey Delaroche detail

Regicide is the purposeful killing of a monarch and is often associated with a violent change in the regime, as in a revolution. A regicide can also be the person responsible for the killing. The word comes from the Latin roots of regis and cida (cidium), meaning "of monarch" and "killer" respectively. In the British tradition, it refers to the judicial execution of a king after a trial, reflecting the historical precedent of the trial and execution of Charles I of England. The concept of regicide has also been explored in media and the arts through pieces like Macbeth (Macbeth's killing of King Duncan).

Scholars have found that regicide is particularly common in political systems with unclear succession rules.

== History ==
In Western Christianity, regicide was far more common prior to 1200/1300. Sverre Bagge counts 20 cases of regicide between 1200 and 1800, which means that 6% of monarchs were killed by their subjects. He counts 94 cases of regicide between 600 and 1200, which means that 21.8% of monarchs were killed by their subjects. He argues that the most likely reasons for the decline in regicide is that clear rules of succession were established, which made it hard to remove rightful heirs to the throne, and only made it so that the nearest heir (and their backers) had a motive to kill the monarch.

According to a 2025 analysis, regicide was common across Chinese history in the period 1046 BCE to 1911 CE. Of these 35.7% of rulers died unnaturally, with most of the deaths as a result of killings or suicides prompted by the ruler's relatives and trusted ministers or invading armies. The analysis found that uncertainty about succession was a key factor in regicide, as rulers with unclear succession were more likely to be killed.

There is evidence that regicide and the ability of states to keep or even expand their territories are negatively correlated: Firstly, elite violence hindered the development of territorial state capacity, and the killing of rulers also directly resulted in a more likely loss of territory. Secondly, state capacity, reflected by territorial state capacity, could be hypothesized to have had a restraining effect on interpersonal violence. This would be consistent with Pinker's (2011) view that modern state capacity leads to a reduction in violence, both interpersonal and in terms of military conflict.

=== Britain ===
Before the Tudor period, English kings had been murdered while imprisoned like Edward II and Edward V, or killed in battle like Richard III. Scottish kings had also died in battle against rebels (such as James III) or been assassinated (Duncan II, James I).

==== Execution of Mary, Queen of Scots ====
The word regicide seems to have come into popular use among continental Catholics when Pope Sixtus V renewed the papal bull of excommunication against the "crowned regicide" Queen Elizabeth I, for—among other things—executing Mary, Queen of Scots, in 1587, although she had abdicated the Scottish crown some 20 years earlier. Elizabeth had originally been excommunicated by Pope Pius V, in Regnans in Excelsis, for converting England to Protestantism after the reign of Mary I of England.

==== Execution of Charles I of England ====
After the First English Civil War, King Charles I was a prisoner of the Parliamentarians. The Parliamentarians attempted to negotiate a compromise with him, but he stuck steadfastly to his view that he was king by divine right and attempted in secret to raise an army to fight against them. It became obvious to the leaders of the Parliamentarians that they could not negotiate a settlement with him and that they could not trust him to refrain from raising an army against them; they reluctantly came to the conclusion that he would have to be put to death. On 13 December 1648, the House of Commons broke off negotiations with the King. Two days later, the Council of Officers of the New Model Army voted that the King be moved from Carisbrooke Castle on the Isle of Wight, where he was a prisoner, to Windsor "in order to the bringing of him speedily to justice". In the middle of December, the King was moved from Windsor to St James's Palace, Westminster. The House of Commons of the Rump Parliament passed a bill setting up a High Court of Justice in order to try Charles I for high treason "in the name of the people of England". From a Royalist and post-restoration perspective, this bill did not become a lawful statute, as the House of Lords refused to pass it and it predictably failed to receive royal assent. However, the Parliamentary leaders and the Army pressed on with the trial regardless.

At his trial in the High Court of Justice on Saturday 20 January 1649 in Westminster Hall, Charles asked "I would know by what power I am called hither. I would know by what authority, I mean lawful". In view of the historic issues involved, both sides based themselves on surprisingly technical legal grounds. Charles did not dispute that Parliament as a whole did have some judicial powers, but he maintained that the House of Commons on its own could not try anybody, and so he refused to plead. At that time under English law, if a prisoner refused to plead, they would be treated identically to one who had pleaded guilty. This has since changed; a refusal to plead is now interpreted as a not-guilty plea.

Charles was found guilty on Saturday 27 January 1649, and his death warrant was signed by fifty-nine commissioners. To show their agreement with the sentence of death, all of the Commissioners who were present rose to their feet.

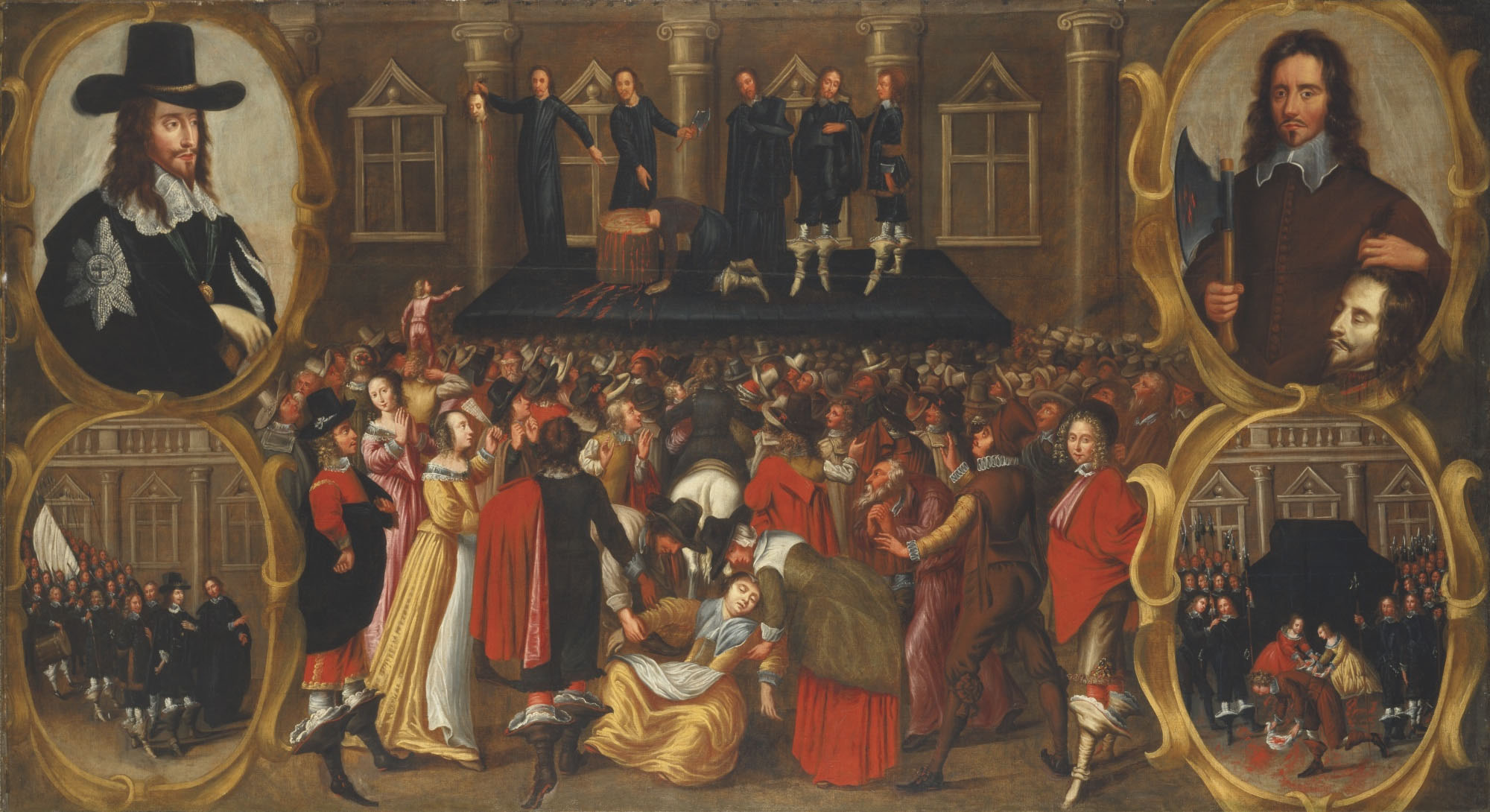
A contemporary print depicting Charles I's beheading

On the day of his execution, 30 January 1649, Charles dressed in two shirts so that he would not shiver from the cold, lest it be said that he was shivering from fear. His execution was delayed by several hours so that the House of Commons could pass an emergency bill to make it an offence to proclaim a new King, and to declare the representatives of the people, the House of Commons, as the source of all just power. Charles was then escorted through a window of the Banqueting House in the Palace of Whitehall to an outdoor scaffold where he would be beheaded. He forgave those who had passed sentence on him and gave instructions to his enemies that they should learn to "know their duty to God, the King – that is, my successors – and the people". He then gave a brief speech outlining his unchanged views of the relationship between the monarchy and the monarch's subjects, ending with the words "I am the martyr of the people". His head was severed from his body with one blow.

One week later, the Rump, sitting in the House of Commons, passed a bill abolishing the monarchy. Ardent Royalists refused to accept it on the basis that there could never be a vacancy of the Crown. Others refused because, as the bill had not passed the House of Lords and did not have royal assent, it could not become an Act of Parliament.

The Declaration of Breda 11 years later paved the way for the restoration of the monarchy in 1660. At the time of the restoration, thirty-one of the fifty-nine Commissioners who had signed the death warrant were living. Parliament, with the assent of the new king, Charles II, enacted the Indemnity and Oblivion Act, giving a general pardon to those who had committed crimes during the civil war and interregnum, but the regicides were among those excluded from it. A number fled. Some, such as Daniel Blagrave, fled to continental Europe, while others like John Dixwell, Edward Whalley, and William Goffe fled to New Haven, Connecticut. Those regicides who could be found and arrested were put on trial. Six were found guilty and suffered the fate of being hanged, drawn and quartered: Thomas Harrison, John Jones, Adrian Scrope, John Carew, Thomas Scot, and Gregory Clement. The captain of the guard at the trial, Daniel Axtell, who encouraged his men to barrack the King when he tried to speak in his own defence, an influential preacher, Hugh Peters, and the leading prosecutor at the trial, John Cook, were executed in a similar manner. Colonel Francis Hacker, who signed the order to the executioner of the king and commanded the guard around the scaffold and at the trial, was hanged. Concern amongst the royal ministers over the negative impact on popular sentiment of these public tortures and executions led to jail sentences being substituted for the remaining regicides.

Some regicides, such as Richard Ingoldsby and Philip Nye, were conditionally pardoned, while a further 19 served life imprisonment. The bodies of the regicides Cromwell, Bradshaw, and Ireton, which had been buried in Westminster Abbey, were disinterred and hanged, drawn and quartered in posthumous executions. In 1662, three more regicides, John Okey, John Barkstead and Miles Corbet, were also hanged, drawn and quartered. The officers of the court that tried Charles I, those who prosecuted him, and those who signed his death warrant, have been known ever since the restoration as regicides.

The Parliamentary Archives in the Palace of Westminster, London, holds the original death warrant for Charles I.

==== Britain, 1760–1850 ====
Some people throughout in the 1760–1850 period in England and Great Britain who have been suspected, arrested, and perhaps punished for trying to lethally harm the reigning monarch, which has sometimes been understood to be attempted "regicide", do not appear to have had the intention of actually killing the king or queen. According to Poole (2000), the actions and utterances of English figures such as Nicholson, Firth, Sutherland, Hadfield, Collins, Oxford, Francis and Bean, all of whom tried to get the monarch's attention for some matter, "point more often to physical remonstance after experiences of extreme frustration with an ineffectual petitioning process." Others who did try to kill the ruler did so not in order to replace the monarchy with a republic, but because they hoped that their successor would be a better ruler, and able to address certain issues which, in the would-be assassins' views, the current sovereign failed to properly act on. According to British radical orator John Thelwall (1764–1834), regicide was simply a means of replacing an unacceptable monarch with a better one.

=== France ===
On 25 June 1836, a Frenchman named Alibaud attempted to assassinate the "July Monarch" Louis Philippe I by shooting him. At trial, Alibaud held the king responsible for the economic ruin of his family, compared himself to Marcus Junius Brutus (most well known amongst the assassins of Julius Caesar), and stated: "Regicide is the right of all men who are debarred from any justice but that which they take into their own hands." He was executed by guillotine.

=== Mexico ===
After the abolishment of the First Mexican Empire, Agustín I was first exiled and on 11 May 1823, the ex-emperor boarded the British ship Rawlins en route to Livorno, Italy (then part of the Grand Duchy of Tuscany), accompanied by his wife, children, and some servants.

Later, after the downfall of the Second Mexican Empire, which saw the reign of Maximilian I—a member of the House of Habsburg, which had previously ruled Mexico as New Spain from the 16th to 18th century—the Republican forces of Benito Juárez, with aid from the U.S. and sabotage by Colonel Miguel López, captured and executed him on 19 June 1867. Emperor Maximilian's last words were "May my blood which is about to be spilled end the bloodshed which has been experienced in my new motherland. Long live Mexico! Long live its independence!"

=== Portugal ===
The Lisbon Regicide or Regicide of 1908 (Portuguese: Regicídio de 1908) was the assassination of King Carlos I of Portugal and the Algarves and his heir-apparent, Luís Filipe, Prince Royal of Portugal, by assassins sympathetic to Republican interests and aided by elements within the Portuguese Carbonária, disenchanted politicians and anti-monarchists. The events occurred on 1 February 1908 at the Square of Commerce along the banks of the Tagus River in Lisbon, commonly referred to by its antiquated name Terreiro do Paço.

=== Iraq ===
On 14 July 1958, at least four members of the ruling Hashemite family (including the King and the Crown Prince) of the Kingdom of Iraq were killed by revolutionaries of the Nationalist Officers' Organization under the command of Abdul Salam Arif.

=== Italy ===
King Umberto I was assassinated by Italian-American anarchist Gaetano Bresci on the evening of 29 July 1900 in Monza. Bresci claimed he wanted to avenge the people killed in Milan in the course of the Bava Beccaris massacre.

=== Yugoslavia ===
King Alexander I of Yugoslavia was assassinated on 3 October 1934, alongside French Foreign Minister Louis Barthou in Marseille, France, by the Ustaše.

=== Nepal ===
The Nepalese royal massacre was carried out on 1 June 2001 by Crown Prince Dipendra, who killed 10 members of the Nepalese royal family, including King Birendra and Queen Aishwarya. Dipendra then attempted suicide, but instead went into a coma and was proclaimed king until his death on 4 June.

=== Russia ===
The assassination of Alexander II occurred on 1 March 1881, when members of the Narodnaya Volya organization threw a bomb at his carriage, which exploded, killing him.

The murder of the Romanov family occurred on the night of 16–17 July 1918, which resulted in the deaths of Tsar Nicholas II, Tsarina Alexandra, and their five children. This ended the Russian monarchy.

=== Jordan ===
King Abdullah I of Jordan was shot dead in the Al-Aqsa Mosque on 20 July 1951 by Mustafa Shukri Ashshu, a Palestinian who objected to the Jordanian annexation of the West Bank. The assassin was killed by bodyguards, and Abdullah was succeeded as King by his son Talal.

=== Saudi Arabia ===
King Faisal of Saudi Arabia was assassinated by his cousin Faisal bin Musaid Al Saud on March 25, 1975 at a majlis in Riyadh, an audience where the King met his subjects. The regicide Faisal (later executed by beheading) is believed to have been motivated by anger over the death of his brother Khaled, who was killed by police after leading an attack on a TV station; he believed the use of television to be forbidden in Islam. The King was succeeded by his half-brother Khalid.

=== Austria ===
On 10 September 1898, Empress Elisabeth of Austria was assassinated in Geneva, Switzerland, by Italian anarchist Luigi Lucheni, who stabbed her before boarding a ferry.

=== Korea ===
8 October 1895 saw the Assassination of Empress Myeongseong of Korea, by Japanese agents.

== Usurpation ==
Motives for regicide also include the desire to obtain the power of the previous ruler. Dion, the ruler of Syracuse, determined to avoid conspiracies, entrusted his aid Calippus with the task of forming a false conspiracy in order to spot potential traitors. Calippus would then abuse this trust, and assassinate Dion to seize authority. According to Roman tradition, Tarquinius Superbus killed the then-king Servius Tullius, by lifting him up and throwing him down a flight of stairs. Tarquin would then start a reign of terror which saw the execution of many rivals. He would later be overthrown by Lucius Junius Brutus, whom founded the Roman Republic after the Tarquin family was exiled. Plautianus unsuccessfully tried to assassinate the Roman Emperor Septimius Severus and his son, Caracalla. His plot was exposed when Saturninus, the prefect whom Plautianus assigned the killings to, had fooled Plautianus to put such agreement in writing in order to give as proof to the emperor Severus.

== See also ==
- Assassination
- List of regicides
- List of heads of state and government who were assassinated or executed
- List of heads of state and government who died by suicide
- Fifth Monarchists saw the overthrow of Charles I as a divine sign of the second coming of Jesus.
- Society of King Charles the Martyr
- Monarchomachs
- Fratricide (killing one's brother)
- Matricide (killing one's mother)
- Patricide (killing of one's father)
- Sororicide (killing one's sister)
- Tyrannicide (killing of a tyrant)
