= Petition of the three colonels =

The petition of the three colonels or The Humble Petition of Several Colonels of the Army was a document of the English Interregnum. Written by the Republican agitator John Wildman in the name of John Okey, Thomas Saunders, and Matthew Alured—three colonels in the New Model Army—it criticised Oliver Cromwell and the Protectorate, called for the institution of the Council of Officers' Agreement of the People of December 1648 and was circulated in the army during 1654. On 18 October that year, after the petition had been ceased and the three officers arrested, John Wildman published it. Okey was court-martialled, found not guilty of treason, and set free once he resigned his commission. Saunders was not tried after he resigned his commission. Alured was cashiered from the Army and spent a year in prison because, in addition to signing the petition, he had stirred up dissatisfaction among English troops stationed in Ireland.
