= Wapen van Holland =

Dutch ship (1653–1662)

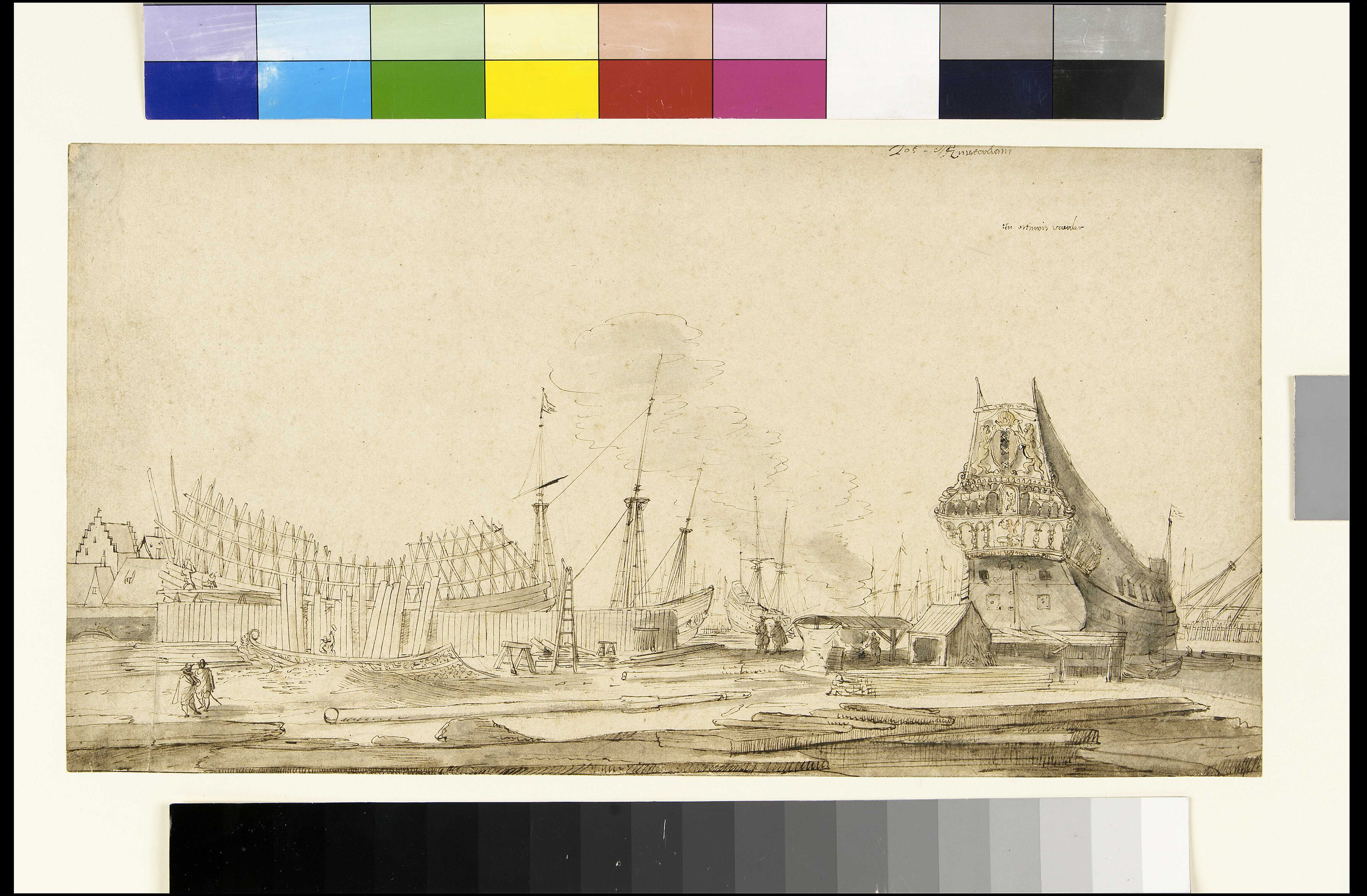
- Wapen van Holland by Reinier Nooms (1650s). Now part of the Royal Museums Greenwich collection

History

Dutch Republic
- Name: Wapen van Holland
- Owner: Dutch East India Company; Chamber of Amsterdam
- Completed: 1653
- Fate: Disappeared on 11 February 1662 in the Indian Ocean

General characteristics
- Capacity: loading capacity: 920 tons

Wapen van Holland was a 17th-century merchant ship of the Dutch East India Company.

Wapen van Holland sailed several times from Vlie, Dutch Republic to Batavia, the Dutch East Indies. During her third return voyage to the Dutch Republic, being part of a fleet of seven VOC ships she disappeared in the Indian Ocean. The crew members and the ship were never found.

== Ship details ==
Wapen van Holland was built in 1653 in Amsterdam for the Chamber of Amsterdam. She was made of wood and had a loading capacity of 920 tons. The ship had 50 guns (134 ft).

== History and fate ==
On 26 October 1654, departing from Vlie, she made her first voyage to Batavia under command of Pieter de Bitter. She had an intermediate stop at Cape of Good Hope for thee weeks from February to March 1655 and arrived at Batavia on 16 May 1655. One and a half year later, in December 1656 she returned to Vlie, where she arrived via Cape of Good Hope in July 1657. In 1661 she went for the third time to Batavia.

Captained by Maarten Doedesz, the Wapen van Holland was one of seven VOC ships that left Batavia on 23 December 1661, homeward bound via the Cape of Good Hope. The other vessels were the Arnhem, Prins Willem, Vogel Phoenix, Maarsseveen, Prinses Royal and Gekroonde Leeuw. Wapen van Holland had a cargo of porcelain.

On 11 February 1662, the fleet was scattered by a violent storm. Wapen van Holland, Gekroonde Leeuw (1,200 tons) and Prins Willem (1,200 tons) disappeared in the Indian Ocean without trace. The following day also the Arnhem ran aground.

== Predictive dreaming ==
Six weeks after the departure of the fleet on 23 December 1661, Governor General Joan Maetsuycker dreamed three times that the Wapen van Holland wrecked. In his dream he heard fleet commander Aernout de Vlaming van Outshoorn (on board of the Wapen van Holland), his wife and newborn twins screaming for help. Maetsuycker wrote down his dreams; a few days later the Wapen van Holland disappeared.
