= John Okey =

English politician (1606–1662)

John Okey JP
- Colonel John Okey

Member of Parliament for Bedfordshire
- In office January 1659 – May 1659

Member of Parliament for Boroughs of Linlithgow, South Queensferry, Perth, Culross, and Stirling
- In office September 1654 – January 1655

Personal details
- Born: 24 August 1606 (baptised) City of London, England
- Died: 19 April 1662 (aged 55) Tower Hill, London
- Resting place: Tower of London
- Spouse(s): (1) Susanna Pearson (1630–1656) (2) Mary Blackwell (1658-his death)
- Children: John (b.1640)
- Occupation: Religious radical, regicide, and Parliamentarian soldier

Military service
- Rank: Colonel
- Battles/wars: Wars of the Three Kingdoms; Siege of Lichfield; Cropredy Bridge; Naseby; Bristol 1645; St Fagans; Siege of Pembroke Castle; Siege of Stirling Castle; Siege of Dundee

Colonel John Okey (baptised 24 August 1606, died 19 April 1662) was a religious radical from London, who served in the Parliamentarian army throughout the Wars of the Three Kingdoms. A supporter of Oliver Cromwell, he was one of those who approved the Execution of Charles I in January 1649.

Despite his friendship with Cromwell, Okey criticised his appointment as Lord Protector, and was forced to resign from the army in 1654. In 1659, he was elected as an MP in the Third Protectorate Parliament, and opposed the 1660 Stuart Restoration. Excluded from the 1660 Indemnity and Oblivion Act as a regicide, he took refuge in the Dutch Republic, but was extradited to England and executed on 19 April 1662.

== Personal details ==
John Okey was baptised at St Giles-in-the-Fields, London, on 24 August 1606, sixth child of William Okey and his wife, Margaret Whetherly. On 21 January 1630, he married Susanna Pearson (c. 1612–1656); after her death in 1658, Mary Blackwell became his second wife.

== War of the Three Kingdoms ==
Despite claims Okey worked in a brewery, (Note: Mocking the allegedly low social origins of their opponents was a common tactic for Royalist historians) his family appear to have been relatively prosperous, and by 1640 he owned a ship chandler business in London. A religious Independent and Puritan, when the First English Civil War began in August 1642, Okey enlisted in the Parliamentarian army as a quartermaster. In early 1643, he was serving in Staffordshire under Lord Brooke, who was killed at the Siege of Lichfield in March. Brooke was related by marriage to Arthur Haselrig, a leading Independent politician with republican beliefs; this connection may have led to Okey's appointment as captain in Haselrig's regiment.

The date of his original commission is unclear, but Okey's troop was certainly present at the Battle of Cropredy Bridge in June 1644, a Parliamentarian defeat which led to the disintegration of William Waller's Southern Association army. This was one of a series of military failures that led to the establishment of the New Model Army in April 1645, which included a regiment of dragoons. By now a major, Okey was nominated as their colonel, although he had no prior experience of handling these specialised troops.

At Naseby in June 1645, his dragoons repulsed an attack by Royalist cavalry, and subsequently joined the campaign to retake the West Country. They helped expel Royalist garrisons from Burrowbridge and Bath, Somerset, then took part in the recapture of Bristol in September. During this siege, Okey was briefly taken prisoner, but released after the city surrendered.

An upsurge of political activism began after the victory in the first civil war. Okey's regiment was not noticeably radical. Increased political activism did, however, give rise to agitation in June 1647. In December 1647, a loyal address was presented to the commander of the New Model Army, Thomas Fairfax, by many of the troops. Okey's regiment later served in the second civil war in South Wales in 1648. The same year, Okey also brought his regiment to fight in the battle of St Fagans as well as at the siege of Pembroke Castle.

== Involvement in the trial and execution of Charles I ==
In 1648, Okey was appointed a commissioner to the High Court of Justice after the king was declared as having "traitorously and maliciously levyed war against the present parliament and the people therein represented" and set to stand trial. Okey was one of 135 men who were selected and appointed by "An Act of the Commons Assembled in Parliament". Okey, along with about 80 others (all of whom were at risk of being labelled as regicides), was actively involved in the case and was present for most of the court's sittings. Moreover, Okey was one of 59 who signed the king's death warrant, and was also charged with upholding the validity of the actions surrounding the execution of Charles I.

== Religious radicalism ==
John Okey was considered a religious radical, and practised as both a Baptist and a Congregationalist. This outlook affected his military career, and he wrote following his own involvement in the battle of Naseby that the parliamentarians:

"...should magnifie the name of our God that did remember a poore handfull of dispised men, whom they had thought to have swallowed up before them."

In February 1652, after Okey's return to England following a military excursion in Scotland, Okey filed a petition to parliament regarding a number of religious reforms as a means of spreading the Gospel and reforming what he considered to be a flawed parochial ministry. There is also some evidence to suggest that Okey was involved in the creation of John Bunyan's Baptist church in Bedford in 1653.

Following his prosecution as a regicide, Okey was quoted as stating that his actions and strong commitment to Congregationalism was "for righteousness and for justice and for the advancement of a godly magistracy and a godly ministry".

== Petition of the three colonels ==
In 1654, Okey signed the petition of the three colonels, drafted by the Leveller and republican John Wildman, along with colonels Thomas Saunders, and Matthew Alured which criticised Oliver Cromwell and the Protectorate. It was unsuccessful and although only Alured was imprisoned, all three were cashiered from the New Model Army. Okey retired to Bedfordshire, where he had invested heavily in land, and was elected MP for Bedfordshire in the Third Protectorate Parliament of 1659.

== Arrest and execution ==
As part of the political compromise that allowed for the restoration of the monarchy at the end of the interregnum, Parliament passed the Act of Free and General Pardon, Indemnity, and Oblivion. Under this act most people were granted a general pardon for any crimes that they had committed during the civil war and during the interregnum. However two score of people were exempted from this pardon. The exceptions of certain crimes such as murder (without a licence granted by King or Parliament), piracy, buggery, rape and witchcraft, and people named in the act such as those involved in the regicide of Charles I.

Some of those who had reason to believe that they would not be included in the general pardon, fled abroad in an attempt to escape royalist retribution. Okey, with John Barkstead, went to Germany. In fleeing abroad, he forfeited the right to a trial for his alleged crimes and was declared an outlaw.

In 1662, however, while in the Netherlands, Okey was arrested along with Barkstead and Miles Corbet by Sir George Downing, the English ambassador to the Dutch court. The three prisoners were immediately sent to England, and, as they had been previously outlawed, their trial turned entirely on the question of identity.

Okey and his companions were executed at Tower Hill on 19 April 1662; although condemned to be hanged, drawn and quartered, they were left hanging for more than 20 minutes and thus were almost certainly dead before being quartered. Permission had been granted for Okey to be buried by his family in Stepney next to his first wife, but a large crowd had gathered to pay their respects and he was interred within the Tower of London.

== Sources ==
- Barkstead, John; Okey, John; Corbet, Miles (1662). The speeches, discourses, and prayers, of Col. John Barkstead, Col. John Okey, and Mr. Miles Corbet, upon the 19th of April being the day of their suffering at Tyburn. London. pp. 70–71.
- Durston, Christopher (2004). "Okey, John (1606-1662)". Oxford Dictionary of National Biography (online ed.). Oxford University Press. doi:10.1093/ref:odnb/20666. (Subscription, Wikipedia Library access or UK public library membership required.)
- Ede-Borrett, Stephen (2009). "SOME NOTES ON THE RAISING AND ORIGINS OF COLONEL JOHN OKEY'S REGIMENT OF DRAGOONS, MARCH TO JUNE, 1645". Journal of the Society for Army Historical Research. 87 (351). JSTOR 44231688.
- Tibbutt, H.G. (1955). Colonel John Okey 1606-1662. Publications of the Bedfordshire Historical Record Society. Vol. 35. Streatley: Bedfordshire Historical Record Society. ISBN 978-1800107236.
- Toynbee, Margaret; Young, Peter (1970). Cropredy Bridge 1644. Roundwood, Kineton. ISBN 978-0900093173.
