= Arnhem (ship) =

History

Dutch Republic
- Name: Arnhem
- Owner: Dutch East India Company
- Builder: Dutch East India Company, Amsterdam
- Commissioned: c.1654
- Fate: Wrecked on Saint Brandon Rocks (off Mauritius) on 12 February 1662

General characteristics
- Class & type: Dutch East Indiaman
- Tons burthen: 1,000 tons
- Propulsion: Sail
- Sail plan: Three masts

The Arnhem or Aernem (Dutch pronunciation: [ˈɑrnɛm]) was a Dutch East Indiaman sailing vessel that was shipwrecked 12 February 1662 off Mauritius on the Saint Brandon Rocks.

== Description ==
The Arnhem was built by the Dutch East India Company (Dutch: Vereenigde Oostindische Compagnie or VOC) chamber of Amsterdam at their wharf in 1654. It was named after the city of Arnhem in the Netherlands.

The sailing ship was an East Indiaman or spiegelretourschip. It had a capacity of 1,000 tons.

== Fate ==
Captained by Pieter Anthoniszoon, the Arnhem was one of seven VOC ships that left Batavia on 23 December 1661, homeward bound via the Cape of Good Hope. The other vessels were the Wapen van Holland, Prins Willem, Vogel Phoenix, Maarsseveen, Prinses Royal and Gekroonde Leeuw.

On 11 February 1662, the fleet was scattered by a violent storm. The Wapen van Holland (920 tons), Gekroonde Leeuw (1,200 tons) and Prins Willem (1,200 tons) disappeared without trace. The following day Arnhem ran aground on the Saint Brandon Rocks (also known as Cargados Carajos), a group of atolls and reefs some 200 kilometres north-east of Mauritius. Volkert Evertsz and other survivors of the wreck survived by piloting a small boat to Mauritius, and are thought to have been the last humans to see live dodos. They survived the three months until their rescue by hunting "goats, birds, tortoises and pigs". Evertsz was rescued by the English ship Truroe in May 1662. Seven of the survivors chose not to return with the first rescue ship.
