= Francisco Bances Candamo =

Spanish playwright (1662–1704)

Francisco Antonio de Bances y López-Candamo (April 26, 1662 – September 8, 1704) was a playwright of the Spanish Golden Age.

Bances Candamo was born in the mountains of Asturia. His father was a tailor, who died when Bances Candamo was eleven months old, and at the age of ten he moved into the care of a maternal uncle who was a canon in Seville, Antonio López-Candamo. After the death of his uncle, in his early twenties, Bances Candamo moved to Madrid, where he gained fame for his erudition and eloquence. His theatrical career began in 1685 with the premiere of his play Por su rey y por su dama de él, and he was soon appointed he was appointed as dramaturg to the royal court by Charles II of Spain.
