= Matthews baronets =

Extinct baronetcy in the Baronetage of England

The Matthews Baronetcy, of Gobions in the County of Essex, was a title in the Baronetage of England. It was created on 15 June 1662 for Philip Matthews. The title became extinct on the death of the second Baronet in 1708.

== Matthews baronets, of Gobions (1662) ==
- Sir Philip Matthews, 1st Baronet (c. 1642 – 1685)
- Sir John Matthews, 2nd Baronet (died 1708)
