= Gabriel Álvarez de Toledo =

18th-century Spanish writer

- Born: Gabriel Alvarez de Toledo y Pellicer de Tovar; 15 March 1662; Seville, Spain
- Died: 17 January 1714 (aged 51); Madrid, Spain
- Occupations: Poet; writer; librarian; theologian

Seat C of the Real Academia Española
- In office 8 July 1713 – 17 January 1714
- Preceded by: Seat established
- Succeeded by: Alonso Rodríguez Castañón

Gabriel Patricio Álvarez de Toledo y Pellicer de Tovar (15 March 1662—17 January 1714) was a Spanish poet, historian and theologian. He was a humanist, interested in philosophy and philology. He knew classical, semitic and modern languages, among French, Italian and German. He was the senior librarian of king Felipe V of Spain, and a member of the Secretary of State. He belonged to the Order of Santiago and was one of the founders of the Royal Spanish Academy. There are two periods in his life, one profane and the other religious. His poetic works appeared after his death in Madrid in 1744.

== Biography ==
Don Gabriel Patricio Álvarez de Toledo, was the son of Francisco Álvarez de Toledo, a native of Bragança, Portugal, who belonged to the Order of Calatrava, and Luisa María Pellicer de Tobar, a native of Madrid. He was a native of Seville, a descendant of the House of Alba, one of the most illustrious families of the Spanish, and Portugues nobility. He was a founder Member of the Royal Spanish Academy in 1713, Secretary of the King of Spain and a Knight of the Military Order of Alcantara. Of Portuguese descent, he was a true humanist, interested in philosophy and philology.

== Poetic work ==
Some of Don Gabriel's poetic works were printed in 1744 by Diego de Torres Villarroel, Professor of Mathematics and astronomer at the Salamanca University, in Diego de Torres Villarroel, under the title La Burromaquia, (something like "Treatise on the things related to Donkeys"), accompanied by some 17th-century mystical style religious poems.

== Main works ==
- 1713, Historia de la Iglesia y del mundo, desde su creación al diluvio.
- 1744, Obras pósthumas poéticas, con la Burromaquia.

== Sources ==
- Hill, Ruth (2000). Sceptres and Sciences in the Spains: Four Humanists and the New Philosophy (ca. 1680-1740). Liverpool: Liverpool University Press. ISBN 978-1-84631-400-1.
- Poesía del Siglo XVIII [18th century poetry]. Madrid: Editorial Castalia. 1975. ISBN 84-7039-216-6.
