= Purefoy baronets =

Extinct baronetcy in the Baronetage of England

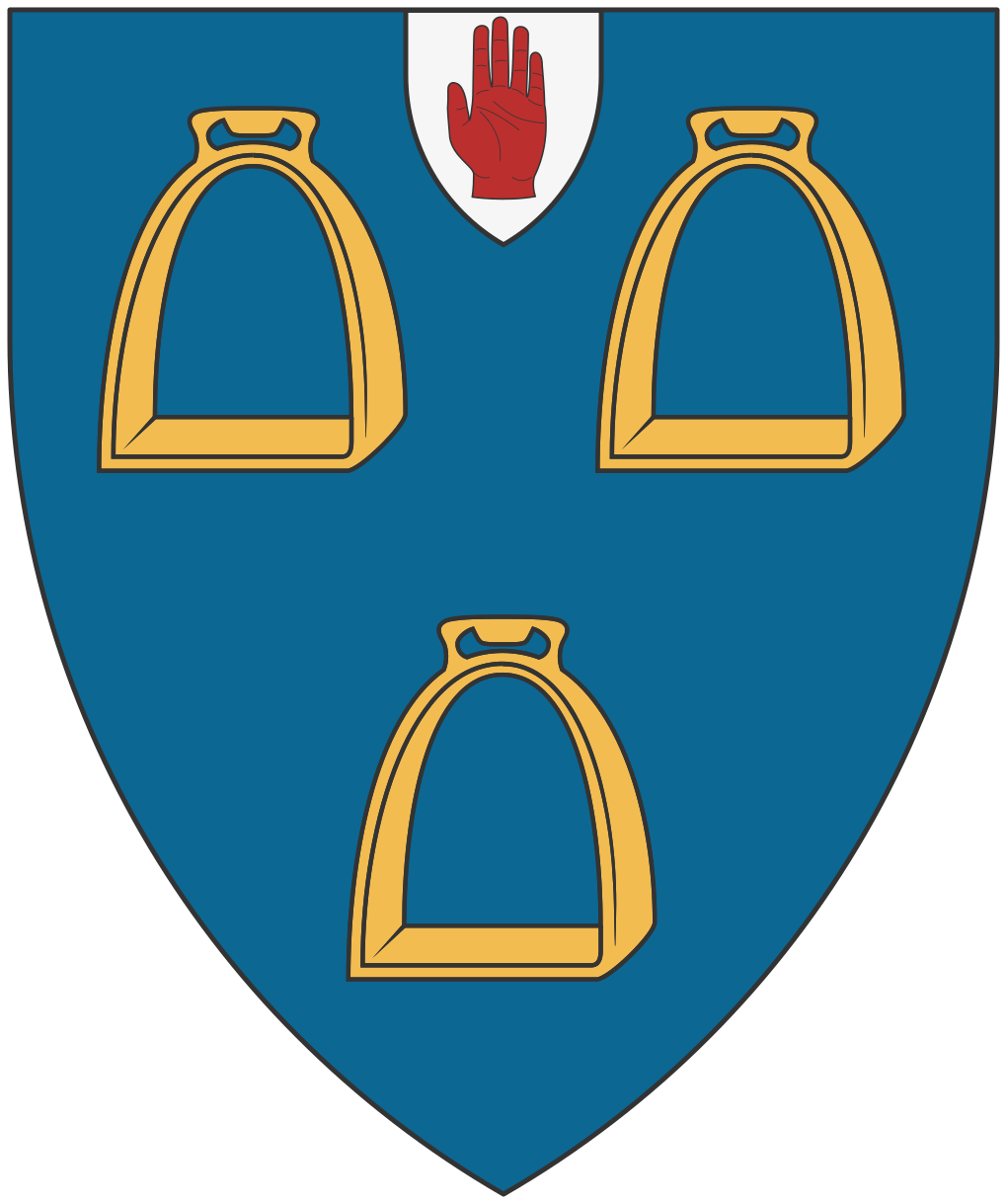
The coat of arms of the Purefoy baronets.

The Purefoy Baronetcy, of Wadley in the County of Berkshire, was a title in the Baronetage of England. It was created on 4 December 1662 for the six-year-old Henry Purefoy. The title became extinct on his death in 1686.

== Purefoy baronets, of Wadley (1662) ==
- Sir Henry Purefoy, 1st Baronet (1656–1686)
