= Miles Corbet =

English politician and regicide (1595–1662)

Miles Corbet MP
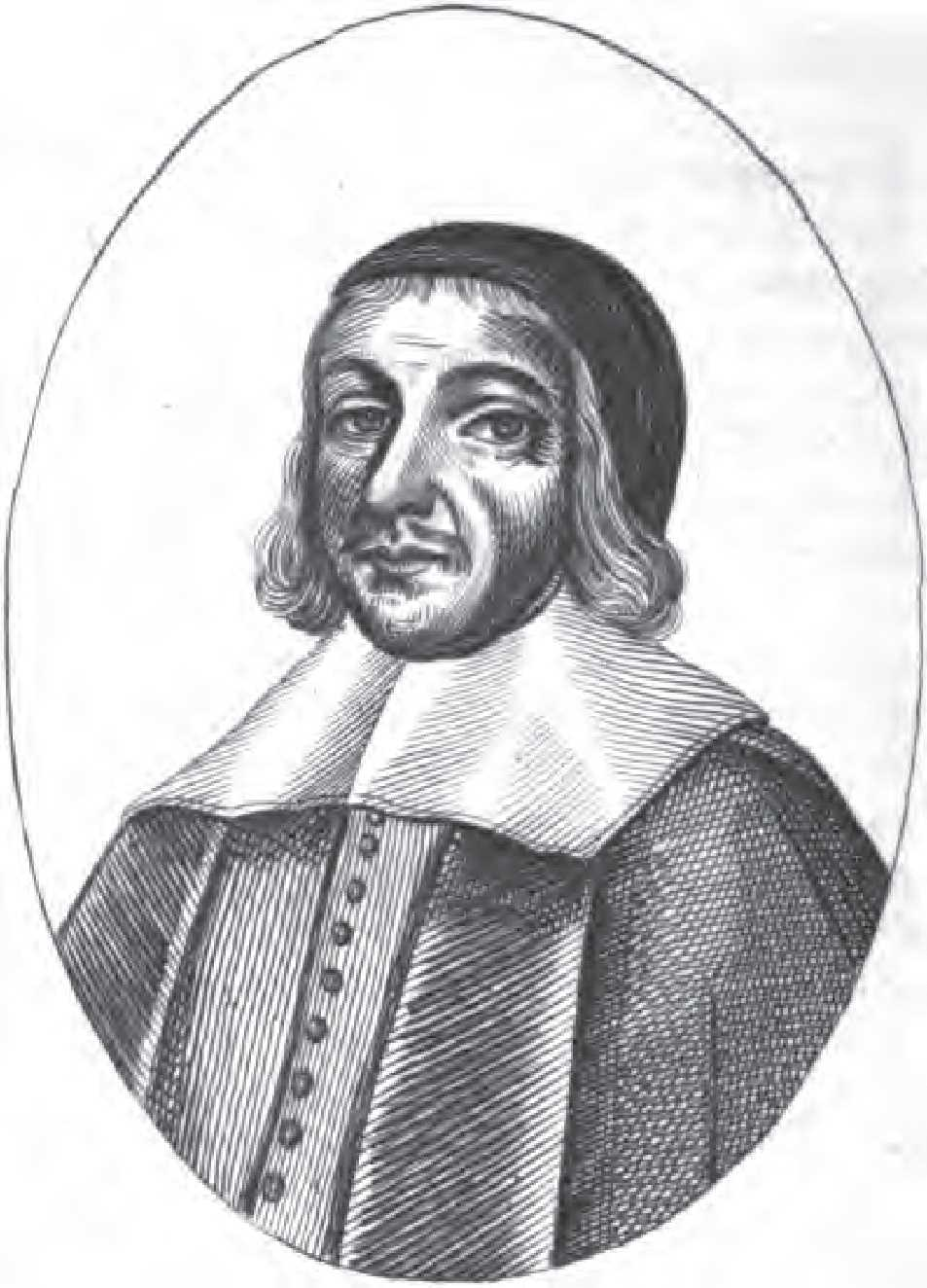

Member of Parliament for Yarmouth
- In office 17 March 1628 – 16 March 1660
- Preceded by: Sir John Corbet, 1st Baronet

Personal details
- Born: c. 1594 Sprowston, Norfolk
- Died: 19 April 1662 Tyburn gallows
- Party: Parliamentarian
- Occupation: Member of Parliament
- Profession: Lawyer

Miles Corbet (1594/5–1662) was an English politician, recorder and member of parliament for Yarmouth, and a regicide of King Charles I.

== Early life ==
Likely born in Sprowston, Norfolk, and a member of the Corbet family, he was the second son of Sir Thomas Corbet and the younger brother of Sir John Corbet, 1st Baronet, MP for Great Yarmouth from 1625 to 1629. In 1612, Miles Corbet matriculated as a pensioner at Christ's College, Cambridge. Corbet entered Lincoln's Inn and was appointed recorder of Great Yarmouth.

== Career ==
=== Member of Parliament for Yarmouth ===
He succeeded his brother John as MP for Yarmouth, England, serving from 1628 to 1653. In 1628, his father Thomas was imprisoned for almost a year in Westminster gatehouse because he refused to pay or support any collection of the 1628 forced loan. Miles created a petition that called for Great Yarmouth to be excused from payment of the loan.

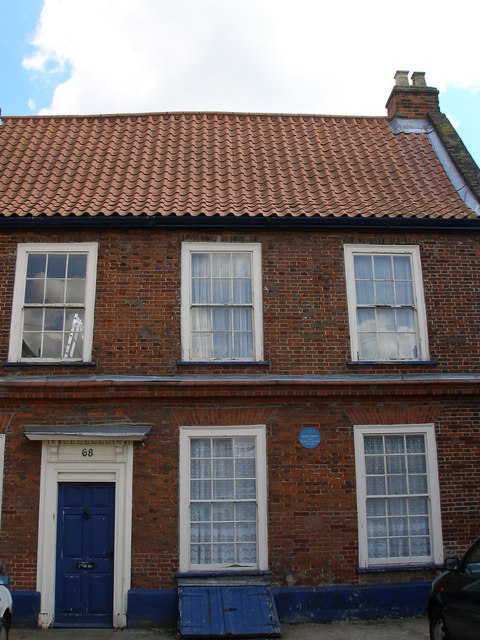
Corbet's house during his time as MP for Yarmouth.

Corbet was elected for the Short and Long Parliaments of 1640. Alongside Cornelius Holland, he led the radical 'Independent' minority within the Committee for Foreign Plantations. In 1644, he was made one of two clerks of the Court of Wards. During this time, he was criticised by Presbyterian stalwarts including Denzil Holles who called his committee for examinations a "continual horse-fair [...] even like dooms-day itself, to judge persons of all sorts and sexes". In 1645, Corbet was the subject of a satire, A most learned speech spoken in the House of Commons by Miles Corbet, taken in short hand by his clarkes. In 1648, alongside Robert Goodwin, he was granted the registrar's office in chancery in place of Walter Long.

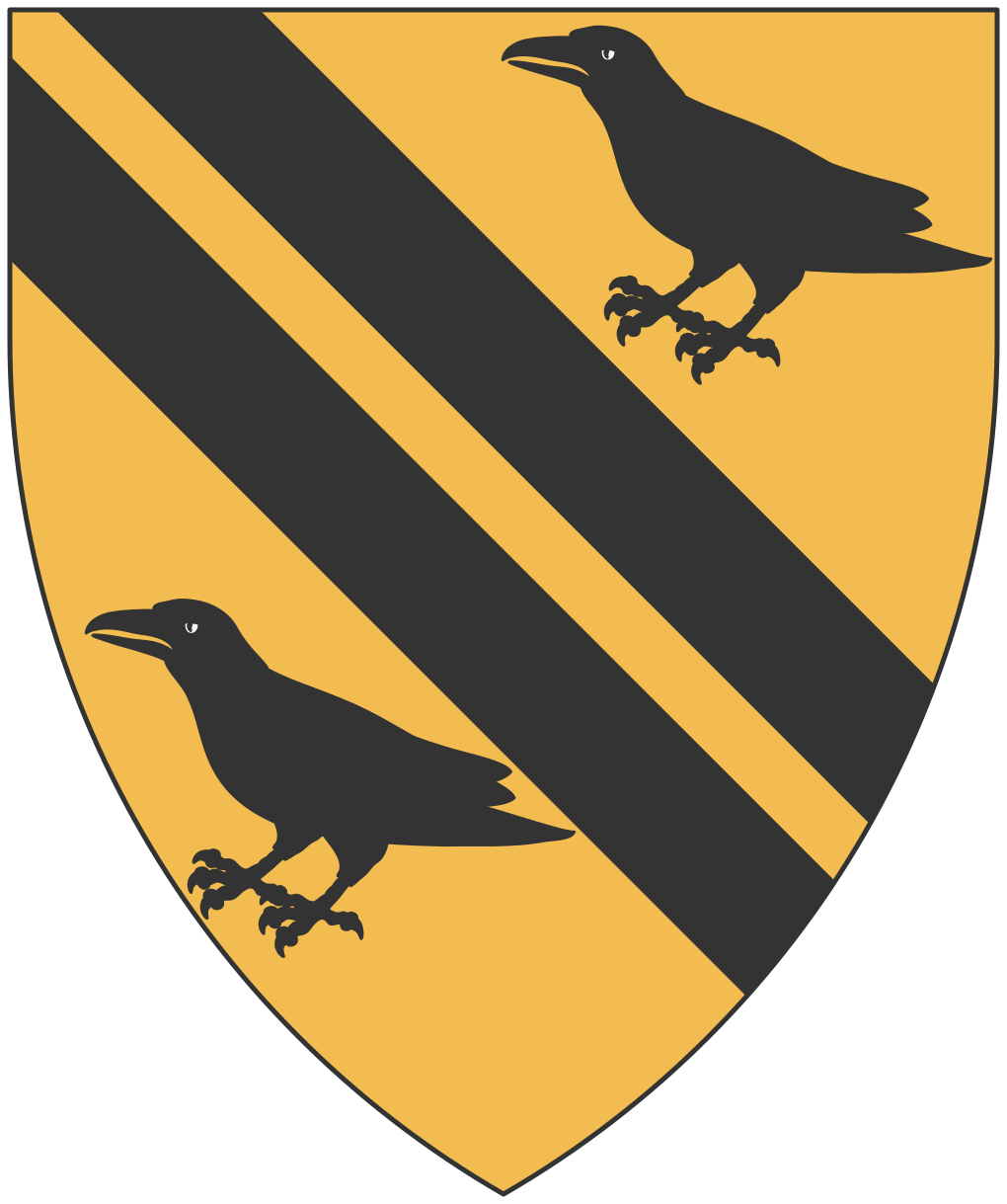
Arms of Corbet as per his seal on Charles I's execution warrant

Then, Corbet was named to the High Court of Justice to try Charles I; he was the final signatory of the warrant for the King's execution, after attending a single session on the matter. He would later reflect on the King's crimes, among which he listed "the horrid rebellion and bloudy massacres of the Protestants in Ireland," and "the levying warr against the parlement and the good people in England".

=== Commissioner in Ireland ===
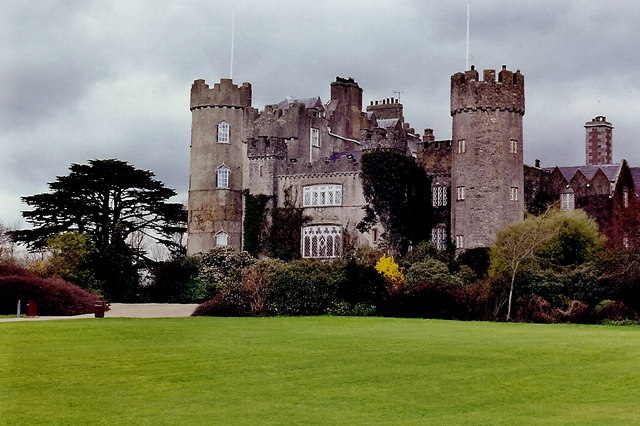
Malahide Castle's estate was granted to Corbet in 1649 until King Charles II's restoration

In 1649, Oliver Cromwell granted the estate of Malahide Castle to Corbet after the Cromwellian conquest of Ireland, and in October 1650 was appointed as one of four civil commissioners in Ireland. He landed in Waterford, Ireland in late 1650 to take up this position. He was appointed to the council in Ireland in August 1654, and that year opposed Irish elections based on the justification that there were unsettled military and climatic conditions. He was also appointed a commissioner of the council to hear and determine cases concerning proposed transplantation to Connaught. In July 1655, Corbet was appointed Chief Baron of the Irish Exchequer. He regained the Irish commissioner post under the restored Rump Parliament, managing the army's affairs and also leading a campaign to replace Presbyterians. Corbet was unsuccessful in the latter aim due to his unpopularity among the army and the public, and in December 1659 the president of Connaught Sir Charles Coote impeached him for maintaining in Ireland the interest of the republican party in England.

=== Post-Restoration ===
After the restoration of King Charles II in 1660, the castle was returned to its ancestral owners. For the Convention Parliament that year, Corbett was returned for Great Yarmouth. However, he lost his place in a double return. All the 59 men who had signed the death warrant of Charles I were in grave danger of severe punishment because they were considered regicides. Corbet, like many of them, fled England. He went to the Netherlands where he thought he would be safe. After 1660, Corbet continued in his belief that Charles I's execution was the will of God; he rejoiced that the Lord had raised up the "weak things of the world to confound the things which are mighty & this is wonderful and glorious in our eyes".

== Capture and execution ==
In the Dutch Republic, along with two other regicides John Okey and John Barkstead, he was arrested by English ambassador to the Netherlands Sir George Downing, who betrayed him. He was returned to England under guard, and imprisoned in the Tower of London. After a trial, Corbet was found guilty. In his last days, he authored a confession of faith that justified the regicide and mourned the restoration:

And now the enemy cast iniquity uppon us and they reproach all the footsteps of god & all his glorious appearances that been amongst us and they say where is their god and where is their reformation, and oh what a deluge of profanes of whoredoms swearing cursings drunkenness poperie prelacie malice raige and bitternesss broken out.

He wrote to his son John the day before his death, bequeathing him his cause and his faith, but no estate. Remaining unrepentant, he was dragged on a sledge to Tyburn, on 19 April 1662, aged 67. In his dying speech, which survives in the holdings of the Norfolk Record Office, he said:

When I was first called to serve in parliament I had an estate; I spent it in the service of the parliament. I never bought any king's or bishop's lands; I thought I had enough, at least I was content with it; that I might serve God and my country was that I aimed at.

Corbet was one of nine of Charles I's regicides to be hanged, drawn and quartered that day, enduring this experience "very cheerfully", and his remains were exposed on London Bridge. His wife Mary, to whom he was close, survived him and had several children, including a son, John.
