= Pierce baronets =

Extinct baronetcy in the Baronetage of Ireland

The Pierce Baronetcy, of Pierce Court in the County of Cavan, was title in the Baronetage of Ireland. It was created on 21 June 1622 for Henry Pierce. The title became extinct on the death of the second Baronet in 1649.

== Pierce baronets, of Pierce Court (1622) ==
- Sir Henry Pierce, 1st Baronet (died 1638)
- Sir George Pierce, 2nd Baronet (1624–1649)
