= John Barkstead =

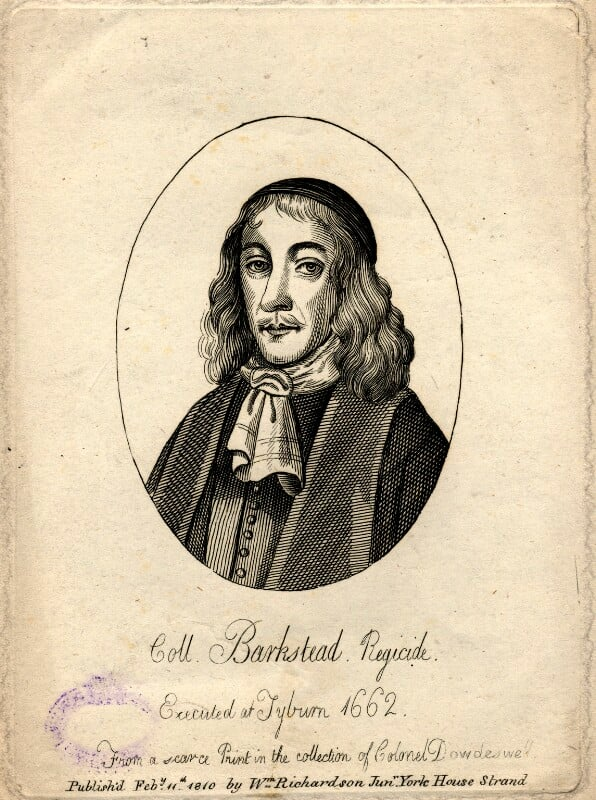
1810 portrait of Barkstead

Major-General Sir John Barkstead (died 19 April 1662) was an English army officer and politician who was one of the regicides of Charles I. Barkstead was a goldsmith in London; captain of parliamentary infantry under Colonel Venn; governor of Reading, 1645: commanded regiment at siege of Colchester; one of the king's judges, 1648; governor of Yarmouth, 1649, Lieutenant of the Tower of London, 1652; M.P. for Colchester, 1654, and Middlesex, 1656; knighted, 1656: escaped to continent, 1660; arrested, 1662; brought to England and executed.

== Biography ==
The date of Barkstead's birth is unknown, was originally a goldsmith in the Strand, and was often taunted by Robert Lilburne (a leveller) and the royalist pamphleteers with selling thimbles and bodkins. "Being sensible of the invasions which had been made upon the liberties of the nation, he took arms among the first for their defence in the quality of captain to a foot company in the regiment of Colonel Venn". On 12 August 1645 he was appointed by the House of Commons governor of Reading, and his appointment was agreed to by the Lords on 10 December. During the Second Civil War he commanded a regiment at the siege of Colchester.

In December 1648 Barkstead was appointed one of the judges of King Charles I. Referring, at his own execution, to the king's trial, he says: "I was no contriver of it within or without, at that time I was many miles from the place, and did not know of it until I saw my name in a paper . . . What I did, I did without any malice". He attended every sitting during the trial except that of 13 January. During the year 1649 he acted as governor of Yarmouth, but by a vote of 11 April 1650 his regiment was selected for the guard of parliament and the city, and on 12 August 1652 he was also appointed Lieutenant of the Tower of London. Cromwell praised his vigilance in that capacity in his first speech to the parliament of 1656: "There never was any design on foot, but we could hear of it out of the Tower. He who commanded there would give us account, that within a fortnight, or such a thing, there would be some stirring, for a great concourse of people were coming to them, and they had very great elevations of spirit". As Lieutenant of the Tower Barkstead's emoluments are said to have been two thousand a year.

In the parliament of 1654 Barkstead represented Colchester, in that of 1656 Middlesex. In November 1655, during the Rule of the Major Generals he was appointed major-general of the county of Middlesex and the assistant of Sir Philip Skippon in the charge of London. His services were rewarded by knighthood (19 January 1656) and by his appointment as steward of Cromwell's household.

Barkstead's conduct as Lieutenant of the Tower was attacked by all parties, and he was charged with extortion and cruelty. In February 1659 he was summoned before the committee of grievances, was obliged to release some prisoners, and was in danger of a prosecution.

At the Restoration Barkstead was one of the seven excepted both for life and estate (6 June 1660), but he contrived to escape to Germany, "and to secure himself became a burgess of Hanau." In 1662, however, he ventured into Holland to see some friends, and Sir George Downing, the king's agent in the United Provinces, having obtained from the states a warrant for his apprehension, seized him in his lodgings with John Okey and Miles Corbet. The three prisoners were immediately sent to England, and, as they had been previously outlawed, their trial turned entirely on the question of identity. Barkstead, with his companions, was executed on 19 April 1662. He showed great courage, thanked God he had been faithful to the powers he had served, and commended to the bystanders "the congregational way, in which he had found much comfort."

At the end of 1662 Samuel Pepys was commissioned by Earl of Sandwich and Sir Henry Bennet, Secretary of State, to search the Tower of London for £7,000, supposed to have been the proceeds of Barkstead's corrupt Governorship and hidden by him in or near the Governor's Lodgings. Pepys' four searches of the Bell Tower cellars and garden yielded nothing.
