= 1666 =

1666 in various calendars
- Gregorian calendar: 1666; MDCLXVI
- Ab urbe condita: 2419
- Armenian calendar: 1115; ԹՎ ՌՃԺԵ
- Assyrian calendar: 6416
- Balinese saka calendar: 1587–1588
- Bengali calendar: 1072–1073
- Berber calendar: 2616
- English Regnal year: 17 Cha. 2 – 18 Cha. 2
- Buddhist calendar: 2210
- Burmese calendar: 1028
- Byzantine calendar: 7174–7175
- Chinese calendar: 乙巳年 (Wood Snake); 4363 or 4156 — to — 丙午年 (Fire Horse); 4364 or 4157
- Coptic calendar: 1382–1383
- Discordian calendar: 2832
- Ethiopian calendar: 1658–1659
- Hebrew calendar: 5426–5427
- Hindu calendars
- Vikram Samvat: 1722–1723
- Shaka Samvat: 1587–1588
- Kali Yuga: 4766–4767
- Holocene calendar: 11666
- Igbo calendar: 666–667
- Iranian calendar: 1044–1045
- Islamic calendar: 1076–1077
- Japanese calendar: Kanbun 6 (寛文６年)
- Javanese calendar: 1588–1589
- Julian calendar: Gregorian minus 10 days
- Korean calendar: 3999
- Minguo calendar: 246 before ROC 民前246年
- Nanakshahi calendar: 198
- Thai solar calendar: 2208–2209
- Tibetan calendar: ཤིང་མོ་སྦྲུལ་ལོ་ (female Wood-Snake); 1792 or 1411 or 639 — to — མེ་ཕོ་རྟ་ལོ་ (male Fire-Horse); 1793 or 1412 or 640

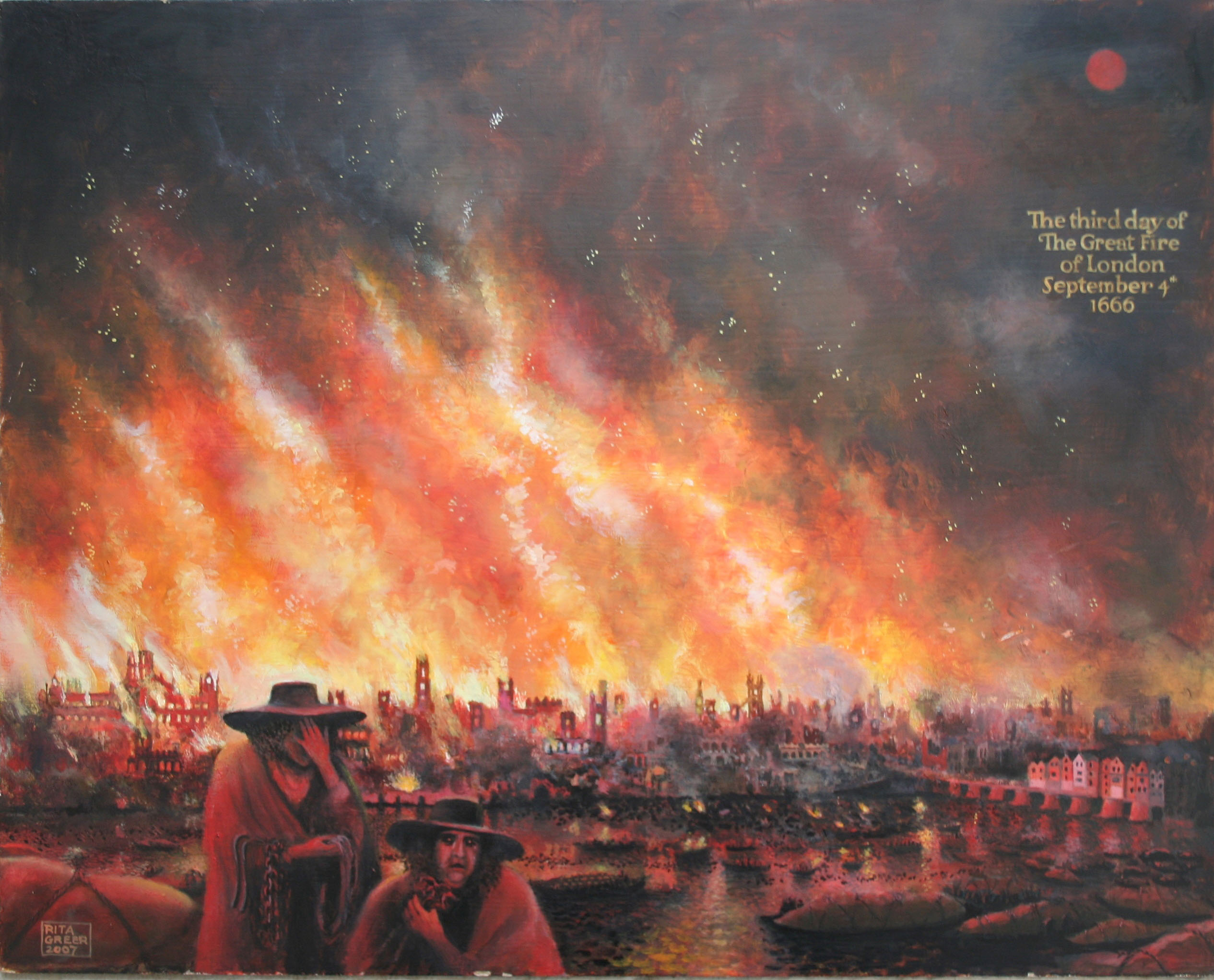
September 2: The Great Fire of London breaks out and destroys much of the English capital over the next four days.

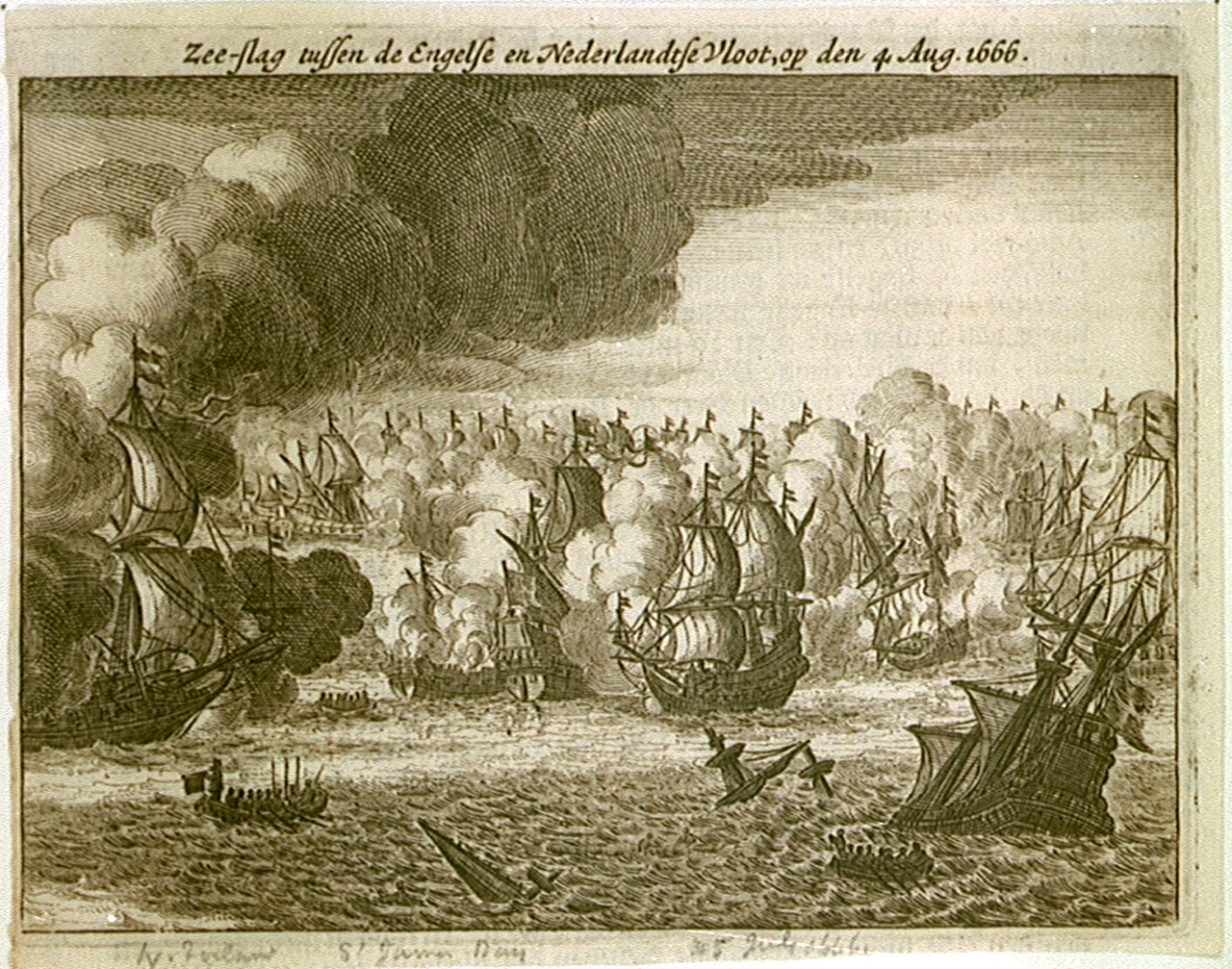
August 4: The Dutch Navy fails to invade the British Isles after the English triumph in the St. James's Day Battle

1666 (MDCLXVI) was a common year starting on Friday of the Gregorian calendar and a common year starting on Monday of the Julian calendar, the 1666th year of the Common Era (CE) and Anno Domini (AD) designations, the 666th year of the 2nd millennium, the 66th year of the 17th century, and the 7th year of the 1660s decade. As of the start of 1666, the Gregorian calendar was 10 days ahead of the Julian calendar, which remained in localized use until 1923.

This is the first year to be designated as an Annus mirabilis, in John Dryden's 1667 poem so titled, celebrating England's failure to be beaten either by the Dutch or by fire.

== Events ==
=== January–March ===
- January 17 – The Chair of Saint Peter (Cathedra Petri, designed by Bernini) is set above the altar in St. Peter's Basilica in Rome.
- January 27 – Mughal conquest of Chittagong: Mughal forces of Emperor Aurangzeb, in alliance with the Portuguese, under Shaista Khan and his son Buzurg Umed Khan, expel the Maghs from the Bengal port city of Chittagong, renaming the city as Islamabad.
- February 1 – The joint English and Scottish royal court returns to London as the Great Plague of London subsides.
- March 11 – The tower of St. Peter's Church, Riga, collapses, burying eight people in the rubble.
- March – The Tavernier Blue, precursor to the Hope Diamond, is first recorded, when French gem merchant Jean-Baptiste Tavernier purchases it from the Kollur Mine in the Mughal Empire in uncut form.

=== April–June ===
- April 20 – In colonial British North America, "Articles of Peace and Amity" are signed between the governments of the Province of Maryland and 12 Eastern Algonquian tribes — the Piscataways, Anacostancks, Doegs, Mattawomans, Portobackes, Chopticos, Mikikiwomans, Manasquesends, Chingwawateicks, Hangemaicks, Sacayos, and Panyayos.
- April 23 – On Saint Christopher Island more commonly called St Kitts, a Caribbean Sea island divided between colonies of England and France, a battle near Sandy Point Town over control of the territory ends with a victory by the French over a numerically-superior English force two days after English Deputy Governor William Watts of Anguilla had sent an expedition to capture the neighbouring island of Saint Martin. Governor Watts and the French Governor of Saint-Christophe, Charles de Sales, are both killed in the battle.
- May 12 – In India, General Shivaji Bhonsale of the Maratha Empire arrives at the Agra Fort for a meeting with Emperor Aurangzeb of the Mughal Empire, as part of the terms of peace under the 1665 Treaty of Purandar. After taking offence at the disrespect shown to him, he gets angry and attempts to leave; he and his son Sambhaji are immediately placed under arrest and imprisoned at the fort.
- May 13 – French theologian Louis-Isaac Lemaistre de Sacy is imprisoned in the Bastille after his conviction for heresy in connection with the Jansenist movement. Sacy uses his two and one-half years of incarceration (which lasts until November 14, 1668), to create the Bible du Port-Royal, a first French language rendition of the Bible, finishing a translation of the Old Testament from the Vulgate, written in Latin, that had been started by his brother Antoine, and then beginning work on the New Testament.
- May 21
  - The Holy Roman Empire, ruled by Leopold I, repurchases the territory of the Duchy of Opole and Racibórz (Oppeln und Ratibor), which it had ceded to Poland in 1645, for the sum of 120,000 guldens and consolidates it with Upper Silesia. The territory will be ceded from Germany to Poland in 1945 at the end of World War II.
  - Iliaș Alexandru becomes the ruler of Moldavia, part of modern-day Romania.
- June 4 – Molière's comedy of manners The Misanthrope is premièred at the Théâtre du Palais-Royal in Paris by the King's Players with himself in the title role.
- June 6 – Moulai al-Rashid is let into Fes by the city's Jews, establishing the power of Morocco's Alawi dynasty, which will continue into the 21st century.
- June 14 (June 4 Julian calendar) – The Four Days' Battle between the Dutch Republic fleet (84 ships under the command of Admiral Michiel de Ruyter) and the English Royal Navy (79 ships led by the Duke of Albemarle) in the North Sea, one of the longest naval engagements in history, ends with a retreat by the English after having started on June 11. A part of the Second Anglo-Dutch War, the battle ends with a Dutch victory, but heavy losses are sustained on both sides: the English lose 1,000 men and 10 ships are sunk, while the Dutch lose four ships and 1,550 men. Damaged, but not destroyed, the English fleet sets about repairs and refitting, and meets the Dutch fleet again on July 25 in the St. James's Day Battle.

=== July–September ===
- July 1 – During the Portuguese Restoration War between Portugal and Spain, the Battle of the Berlengas ends after four days as a fleet of 15 Spanish warships obtains the surrender of Fort of São João Baptista.
- July 6 – On 3 Muharram 1077 AH on the Muslim calendar, Sa'd ibn Zayd, a descendant of Hasan ibn Ali and of Muhammad (founder of Islam) becomes the new Sharif of Mecca, in modern-day Saudi Arabia. His ascension to the post follows the death of his father, Zayd ibn Muhsin, who had been the Sharif since 1631.
- July 13 – The Battle of Matwy, the bloodiest engagement of Lubomirski's rebellion, takes place in Poland at the village of Matwy. Jerzy Sebastian Lubomirski, who has led the revolt against Poland's King Jan II Kazimierz, defeats a larger number of troops led by John III Sobieski of the Polish-Lithuanian Commonwealth. Poland and Lithuania sustain 4,000 deaths compared to 200 rebel casualties.
- July 31 – The Agreement of Legonice is signed, with Poland restoring the titles of Jerzy Sebastian Lubomirski and Lubomirski's officers, granting amnesty to all the rebels, and King Jan II Kazimierz abandoning further reform plans.
- August 2 (July 23 Julian calendar) – A hurricane sweeps through the Caribbean Sea near Guadeloupe five days after Barbados colonial Governor Francis Willoughby led a force of two Royal Navy frigates, 12 commandeered vessels and over 1,000 men in a battle against French colonies during the Second Anglo-Dutch War. Willoughby and most of his crew die in the sinking of his flagship, HMS Hope
- August 4 (July 25 Julian calendar) – In the St. James's Day Battle of the Second Anglo-Dutch War, the English Royal Navy, under the command of Prince Rupert of the Rhine and George Monck, 1st Duke of Albemarle, defeats the Dutch Republic navy off the North Foreland of England. The victory comes 6 weeks after the British fleet had sustained a heavy loss in the Four Days' Battle. The Dutch ships Sneek and Tholen are sunk, with the loss of 800 men, while 300 Englishmen die in the sinking of HMS Resolution.
- August 17 – In India, General Shivaji Bhonsale, future ruler of the Maratha Empire, and his son Sambhaji escape from house arrest at the Agra Fort, where they have been held prisoner since May 12.
- August 19 (August 9 Julian calendar) – Rear Admiral Robert Holmes leads an English Royal Navy raid on the Dutch island of Terschelling, destroying 150 merchant ships in the Vlie estuary over a period of two days, and pillaging the town of West-Terschelling. The action becomes known as "Holmes's Bonfire".
- September 2 – The Great Fire of London begins as a blaze in a bakery owned by Thomas Farriner on Pudding Lane, near London Bridge. Over a period of four days, the fire destroys more than 13,000 buildings (including Old St Paul's Cathedral), but only six people are known to have died, while at least 80,000 are left destitute and homeless. The events are recorded by Samuel Pepys in his diary. The resurveying of property is credited with advancing both cartography and the practices of surveying, as well as resulting in the modern definition by John Ogilby of the statute mile, as 1,760 yards.
- September 4 – Mughal Emperor Aurangzeb grants the French East India Company a royal mandate to trade at the port of Surat.
- September 6 – The Cestui Que Vie Act 1666 is passed by the Parliament of England, to provide for the disposal of the property of missing persons.
- September 16 – The Apostasy of Sabbatai Zevi begins in Istanbul.

=== October–December ===
- October 10 – A "day of humiliation and fasting" is held in London churches a month after the Great Fire of London.
- October 11 – The Sieur de Buat, Captain Henri de Fleury de Coulan of the Army of the Dutch Republic, is beheaded in public at The Hague after being convicted of attempting to overthrow Dutch leader Johan de Witt.
- October 17 – In North America, a French Army regiment led by Alexandre de Prouville de Tracy erects crosses in the Mohawk lands of the eastern Iroquois Confederacy territory along the Mohawk River as part of an invasion that started on September 29. During the expedition, Prouville's forces find four abandoned Mohawk villages in the area, located in the modern U.S. state of New York near the village of Schenectady but never confront any Mohawk defenders, and the French never attempt to enforce their claim.
- October 23 – The most intense tornado on record in English history, an F4 storm on the Fujita scale or T8 on the TORRO scale, strikes the county of Lincolnshire with a path of destruction through the villages of Welbourn, Wellingore, Navenby and Boothby Graffoe, with winds of more than 213 miles per hour (343 km/h).
- October 26 – Abbas II, the Shah of Iran, dies at the age of 34 after a reign of 24 years, without designating a successor. His 18-year old son Sam Mirza is crowned as the new Safavid dynasty emperor six days later.
- October 27 – Robert Hubert, a Frenchman who has made a false confession to having started the Great Fire of London (despite not arriving in England until two days after the blaze started), is executed based on his statements.
- November 28 – The Battle of Rullion Green takes place in the Pentland Hills near Midlothian in Scotland as the culmination of the brief 'Pentland Rising' which began on November 15 as a rebellion by the Covenanters who oppose changes in the Church of Scotland. At least 2,000 men of the Scottish Royal Army, led by General Thomas Dalyell, defeat more than 750 Covenanter rebels who have been under the command of James Wallace of Auchens.
- December 12 – A sobor (church council) of the Russian Orthodox Church deposes Patriarch Nikon of Moscow, but accepts his liturgical reforms. Dissenters from these, known as Old Believers, continue into the 21st century.
- December 19 – Lund University is founded in Lund, Sweden.
- December 22 – The French Academy of Sciences, founded by Louis XIV, first meets.

=== Date unknown ===
- Isaac Newton uses a prism to split sunlight, as referenced in his alchemical works as Lux Dei, into the component colours of the optical spectrum, assisting the understanding of the scientific nature of light. He also develops differential calculus simultaneously with Leibniz. 1666 is consequently referred to as his Annus mirabilis or Newton's "Year of the Morning Star".
- Jean Talon completes a census of New France, the first census in North America.
- Dutch artist Johannes Vermeer paints The Art of Painting, his largest and most complex work.
- The first completed printed Bible translation into Armenian, Astuacašunč hnoc' ew noroc' ktakaranac (Oskanean Bible), is published in Amsterdam, edited by Bishop Oskan Yerevantsi.

== Births ==
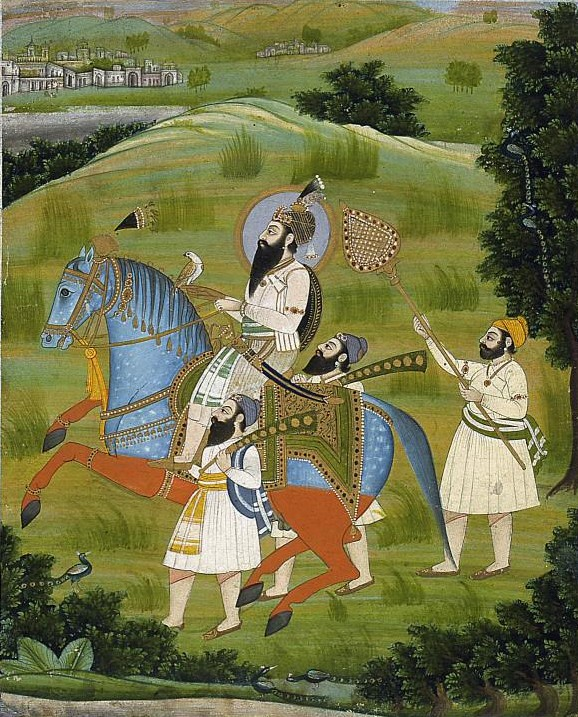
Guru Gobind Singh

- February 1 – Marie Thérèse de Bourbon, Princess of Conti and titular queen of Poland (d. 1732)
- February 9 – George Hamilton, 1st Earl of Orkney, British soldier (d. 1737)
- March 15 – George Bähr, German architect (d. 1738)
- May 14 – Victor Amadeus II of Sardinia (d. 1732)
- July 10 – John Ernest Grabe, German-born Anglican theologian (d. 1711)
- July 23 – Thomas Parker, 1st Earl of Macclesfield (d. 1732)
- August 4 – Maria Sophia of Neuburg, Queen consort of Portugal (d. 1699)
- August 13 – William Wotton, English scholar (d. 1727)
- September 5 – Gottfried Arnold, German church historian (d. 1714)
- September 6 – Tsar Ivan V of Russia (d. 1696)
- November 12 – Mary Astell, English writer (d. 1731)
- December 22 – Guru Gobind Singh, 10th Guru of Sikhism, social reformist, poet, and revolutionary (d. 1708)
- date unknown –
  - Arthur Chichester, 3rd Earl of Donegall (d. 1706)
  - Mary Pix, English author (d. 1709)

== Deaths ==
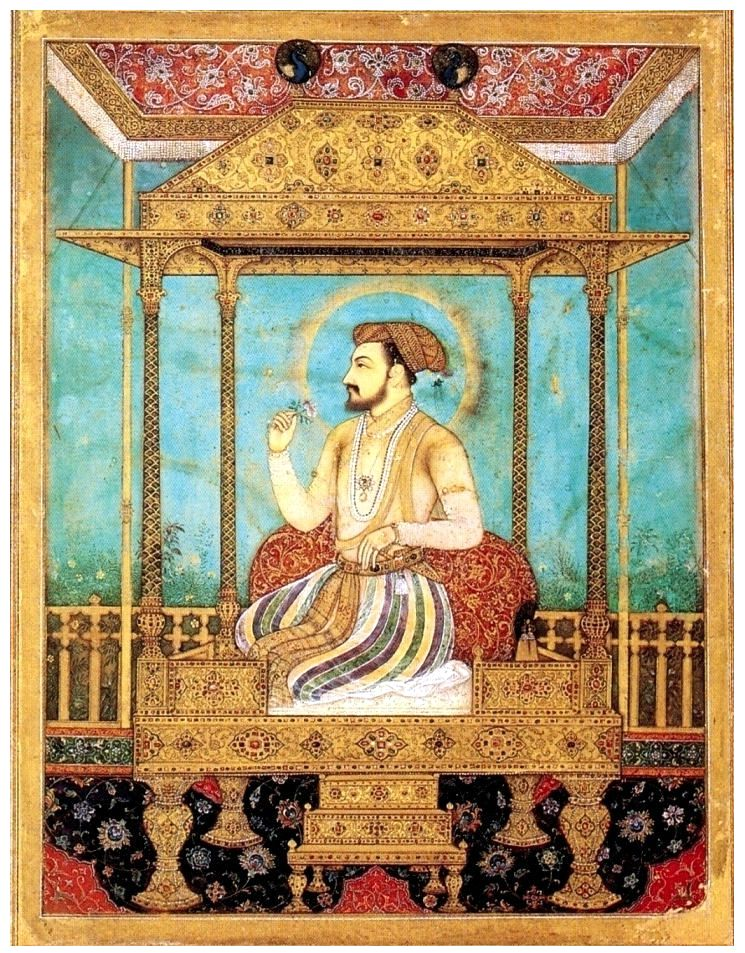
Shah Jahan

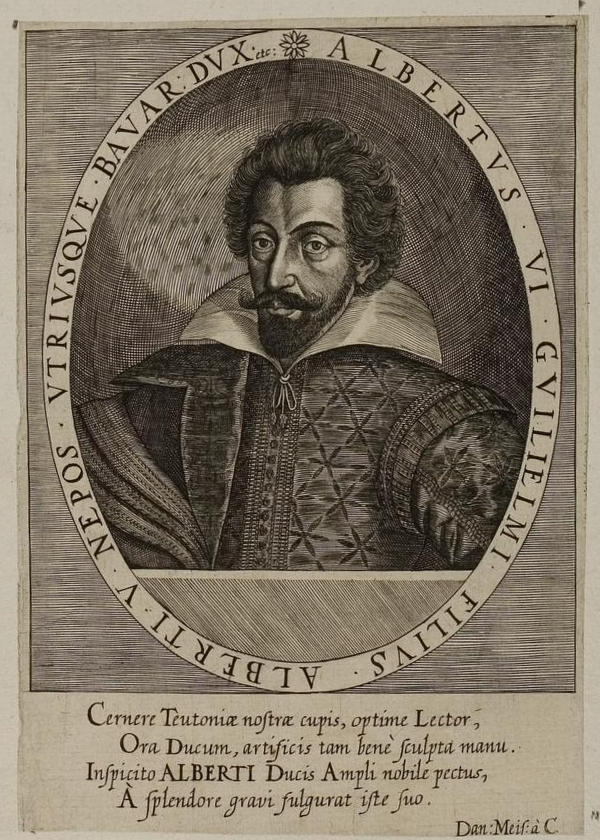
Albert VI of Bavaria

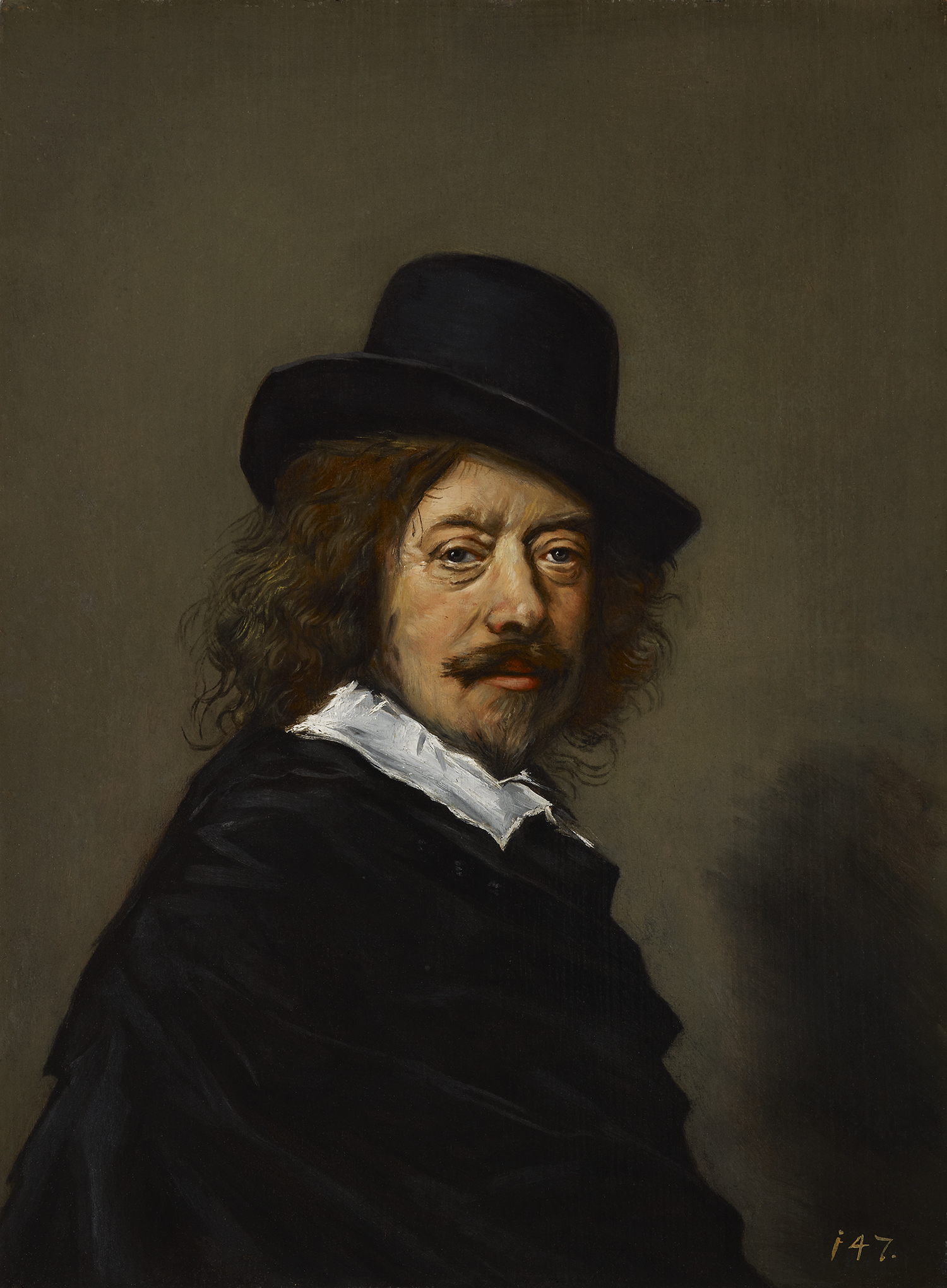
Frans Hals

- January 2 – John Holles, 2nd Earl of Clare, English politician and Earl (b. 1595)
- January 10 – Henry Hastings, 1st Baron Loughborough, English Royalist army commander (b. 1610)
- January 20 – Anne of Austria, queen of Louis XIII and regent of France (b. 1601)
- January 22 – Shah Jahan, Mughal Emperor of India (b. 1592)
- January 24 – Johann Andreas Herbst, German composer (b. 1588)
- January 28 – Tommaso Dingli, Maltese architect and sculptor (b. 1591)
- February 12 – Mildmay Fane, 2nd Earl of Westmorland, English politician (b. 1602)
- February 24 – Nicholas Lanier, English composer (b. 1588)
- February 26 – Armand de Bourbon, Prince of Conti, Frondeur (b. 1629)
- February 27
  - Luisa de Guzmán, Duchess of Braganza and Queen consort of Portugal (b. 1613)
  - Gustav Evertsson Horn, Finnish-Swedish politician, Field Marshal (b. 1614)
- March 1 – Ecaterina Cercheza, Princess consort of Moldavia (b. 1620)
- March 18 – Jan van Vliet, Dutch linguist (b. 1622)
- April 12 – Johann Rudolf Wettstein, Swiss diplomat (b. 1594)
- April 25 – Johann Reinhard II, Count of Hanau-Lichtenberg, German aristocrat (b. 1628)
- May 6 – Paul Siefert, German composer and organist (b. 1586)
- May 13 – Pier Francesco Mola, Italian painter of the High Baroque (b. 1612)
- May 22 – Gaspar Schott, German Jesuit scholar (b. 1608)
- June 11 – Cornelis Evertsen the Elder, Dutch admiral (b. 1610)
- June 12 – Abraham van der Hulst, Dutch admiral (b. 1619)
- June 16 – Sir Richard Fanshawe, British diplomat and translator (b. 1608)
- June 17 – Carlo de' Medici, Italian Catholic cardinal (b. 1595)
- June 28 – Sir Gervase Clifton, 1st Baronet, English politician (b. 1587)
- June 30 – Alexander Brome, English poet (b. 1620)
- July 5 – Albert VI of Bavaria (b. 1584)
- July 18 – Sir John Bowyer, 1st Baronet, English soldier and politician (b. 1623)
- July 25 – Henri, Count of Harcourt (b. 1601)
- July 26 – Camillo Francesco Maria Pamphili, Italian Catholic cardinal (b. 1622)
- July 30 – Francis Erdmann, Duke of Saxe-Lauenburg, Germany (b. 1629)
- August 5 – Johan Evertsen, Dutch admiral (b. 1600)
- August 6 – Tjerk Hiddes de Vries, Frisian naval hero and commander (of wounds received in the St. James's Day Battle) (b. 1622)
- August 15 – Johann Adam Schall von Bell, German Jesuit missionary (b. 1591)
- August 19 – Anton Günther I, Count of Schwarzburg-Sondershausen (b. 1620)
- August 23 – Johannes Hoornbeek, Dutch theologian (b. 1617)
- August 24 – Francisco Manuel de Mello, Portuguese writer (b. 1608)
- August 26 – Frans Hals, Dutch painter (b. 1580)
- September 4 – Girolamo Colonna, Catholic cardinal (b. 1604)
- September 10 – Christian Günther II, Count of Schwarzburg-Sondershausen-Arnstadt (b. 1616)
- September 17 – Augustus the Younger, Duke of Brunswick-Lüneburg (b. 1579)
- September 23 – François Mansart, French architect (b. 1598)
- September 27
  - Georg Albrecht, Margrave of Brandenburg-Bayreuth-Kulmbach (b. 1619)
  - János Szalárdi, Hungarian historian (b. 1601)
- October 12 – Dirk Graswinckel, Dutch jurist (b. 1600)
- October 27 – Manuel António of Portugal, Dutch-Portuguese nobleman (b. 1600)
- October 29 – Edmund Calamy the Elder, English Presbyterian leader (b. 1600)
- October 29 – James Shirley, English dramatist (b. 1596)
- November 1 – Jan Albertsz Rotius, Dutch painter (b. 1624)
- December 1 – James Ware, Irish genealogist (b. 1594)
- December 8 – Philippe Charles, Duke of Valois (b. 1664)
- December 20 – William Strode, English politician (b. 1589)
- December 22 – Guercino, Italian painter (b. 1591)
- December 26 – Alexandrine von Taxis, German Imperial General Post Master (b. 1589)
- December 30 – John Strangways, English politician (b. 1585)
- date unknown
  - Philip Fruytiers, Flemish painter (b. 1627)
  - James Howell, British writer (b. c. 1594)
  - Song Yingxing, Chinese encyclopedist (b. 1587)
