= Pobiedna =

Pobiedna may refer to the following places in Poland:

- Pobiedna, Lower Silesian Voivodeship (south-west Poland)
- Pobiedna, Masovian Voivodeship (east-central Poland)
