= Marcin Dunin =

His Excellency Marcin Dunin Sulgostowski
- Archbishop of Gniezno; Primate of Poland
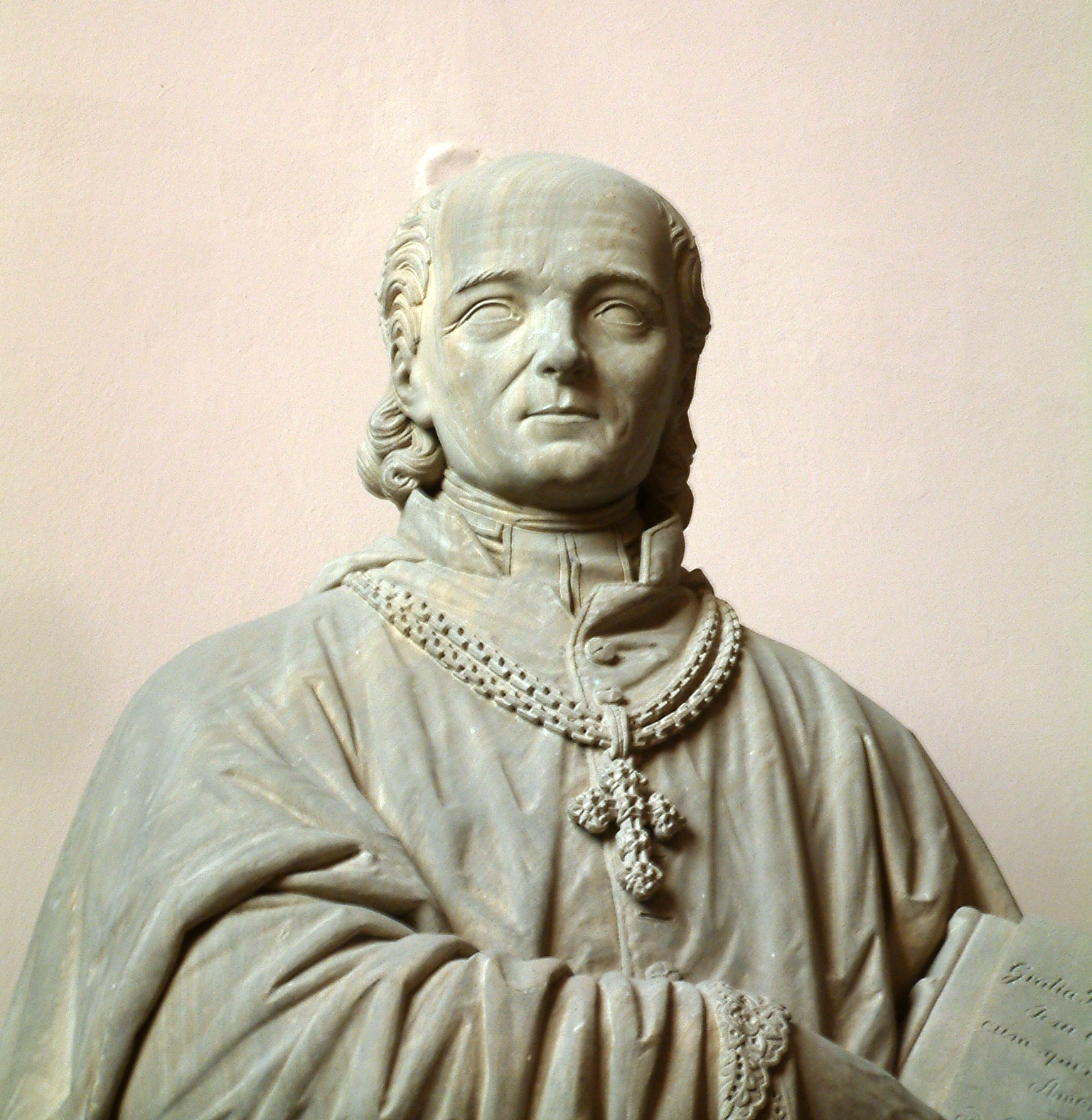
- Statue of Marcin Dunin in Poznań Archcathedral Basilica
- Church: Roman Catholic
- Archdiocese: Gniezno
- Installed: 1845
- Term ended: 1865

Orders
- Ordination: 4 June 1814
- Consecration: 27 April 1845

Personal details
- Born: 11 November 1774 Wał, Poland
- Died: 26 December 1842 (aged 68) Poznań, Grand Duchy of Posen
- Coat of arms

Marcin Dunin Sulgostowski of Łabędź coat of arms (German: Martin von Dunin; 11 November 1774, in Wał – 26 December 1842, in Poznań) was archbishop of Poznań and Gniezno, primate of Poland.

He was the oldest son of common land owners, Felicjan and Brygida née Szczakowska, and grew up under the protection of his uncle, Wacław Szczakowski. His education began in the Jesuits school in Rawa Mazowiecka, which was at that time a community in Congress Poland. He passed Abitur on the German-language gymnasium in Bromberg (now Bydgoszcz), the historic capital of the Royal Prussian Bromberg district. Between 1793 and 1797, he studied theology in Rome (Polish Rzym) at the Collegium Germanicum. Upon graduation he was ordained a priest.

After his return to Prussia, he started his ecclesiastical career by serving as a canon in the Prussian communities of Wiślica (Wislitz) and Włocławek. In 1815, he became chancellor of the Gniezno (Gnesen) Curia. He also held some secular offices – in 1817 he became the royal Prussian counselor for education in Posen District.

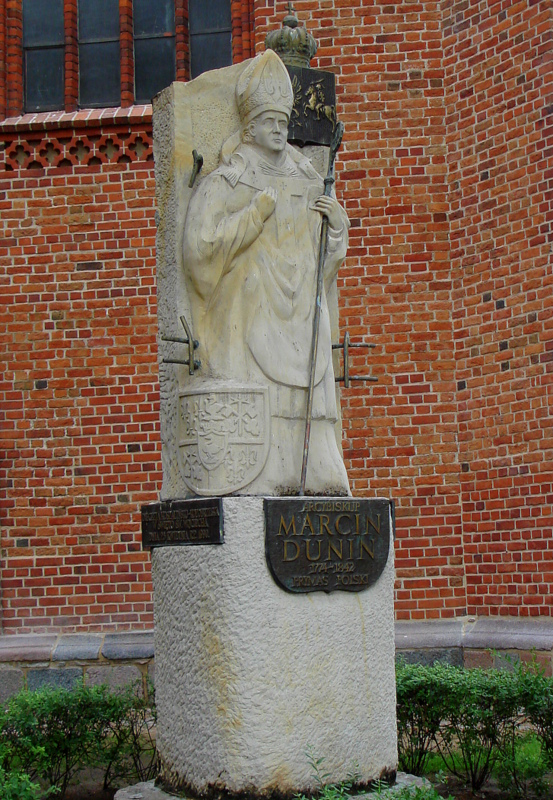
Kołobrzeg, monument of Bishop

Prussian authorities, considering Dunin's loyalty to the King of Prussia, recommended him as a candidate for the sees of archbishops of Poznań and Gniezno. He was appointed to those offices in 1830 and became bishop one year later. As proof of his loyalty and on demand of the president of Grand Duchy of Posen, Eduard Flottwell, Dunin wrote a pastoral letter condemning the November Uprising. On the other hand, Dunin got permission for Polish priests to communicate in Polish rather than German.

In 1837, the conflict between Prussian authorities and the archbishop began. Dunin, according to the breve of Pius VIII (1830), announced that all mixed marriages between Catholics and Protestants had to take an oath that all their offspring would be raised as Catholics. The Prussian authorities sentenced Dunin to six months of internment and the loss of his archbishopric thrones. His penalty started on April 3, 1839 in Berlin. The archbishop considered the sentence to be an unjustified intervention of secular authority into ecclesiastical law. He left Berlin and went to Poznań, where he was arrested. He was later sent to prison in the stronghold at Kolberg (Kołobrzeg). After ten months of penalty, the new king Frederick William IV granted his freedom. The monarch, to prevent a possible uprising of the partial Polish majority of the Grand Duchy, decided the dismissal of Flottwell. This was a foretaste of the Kulturkampf.

Dunin held the Prussian Order of the Black Eagle.

After his return to Poznań, Dunin swore loyalty to the new king, but he continued his anti-Prussian politics in church until his death. He was buried in the archcathedral of Poznań.

== Works ==
- Wilhelm von Schütz; Martin von Dunin: Ueber die preussische Rechtsansicht wegen der gemischten Ehen. Beigefügtes Werk: Nebst Rechtfertigung des Herrn v. Dunin auf die von der königl. Regierung in Berlin durch die Staatszeitung vom 31. Dezember 1838 veröffentlichte Erklärung. Regensburg: Manz, 1839.
- Martin von Dunin und Franz Pohl: Erzbischof von Gnesen und Posen: eine biographische und kirchenhistorische Skizze. Marienburg: Dormann 1843. Posen: W. Stefański, 1850.
- Marcin Dunin: Książka do nabożeństwa z polecenia najprzewielebniejszego śp. arcybiskupa Dunina dla wszystkich katolików szczególniej zaś dla wygody katolików Archidiecezyi Poznańskiéj i Gnieźnieńskiéj. 2. ed. 1850.
- Marcin Dunin: Książka do nabożeństwa dla wszystkich katolików, szczególniéj zaś dla wygody katolików archidyecezyi gnieźnieńskiéj i poznańskiéj / z polecenia najprzewielebniejszego arcybiskupa Dunin ułożone. Leszno: E. Günther, 1853.
- Marcin Dunin: Książka do nabożeństwa dla wszystkich katolików, szczególniéj zaś dla wygody katolików archidyecezyi gnieźnieńskiéj i poznańskiéj z polecenia najprzewielebniejszego X. arcy-biskupa Dunina ułożona, na nowo z rozkazu najprzewielebniejszego arcy-biskupa X. Leona Przyłuskiego przejrzana. Gnesen: J. B. Lange, 1861.
- Marcin Dunin: Książka do nabożeństwa dla wszystkich katolików, szczególniéj zaś dla wygody katolików archidyecezyi gnieźnieńskiéj i poznańskiéj / z polecenia najprzewielebniejszego X. arcy-biskupa Dunina ułożona, na nowo z rozkazu najprzewielebniejszego arcy-biskupa X. Leona Przyłuskiego przejrzana. Gnesen: J. B. Lange, 1864.
- Marcin Dunin: Książka do nabożeństwa dla wszystkich katolików / ułożona podług książki wydanéj z polecenia Najprzewielbniejszego Arcy-biskupa Dunina. Tschenstochau: Kohn und Oderfeld, 1887.
- Marcin Dunin: Nowy pana naszego Jezusa Chrystusa Testament z łacińskiego na język kpolski prezełożony przez Jakóba Wujka. Posen: Nakł. Ksiegarni Katolickiej, 1888.
