= Belek (disambiguation) =

Belek may refer to:

== Toponyms ==
- Belek, a town in Serik district of Antalya Province, Turkey
- Belek, a town in Türkmenbaşy district, Balkan Province, Turkmenistan
- Bełek, a village in Grójec County, Masovian Voivodeship, east-central Poland

== People ==
- Belek Ghazi, 12th-century Turkic bey
