= Albert VI =

Albert VI may refer to:

- Albert VI of Austria (1418–1463)
- Albert VI of Anhalt-Köthen (died 1475)
- Albert VI of Mecklenburg (1438–1483)
- Albert VI of Bavaria (1584–1666)
