= Gostomia =

Gostomia may refer to the following places:

- Gostomia, Masovian Voivodeship (east-central Poland)
- Gostomia, Opole Voivodeship (south-west Poland)
- Gostomia, West Pomeranian Voivodeship (north-west Poland)
