= Florian Stępniak =

Polish Capuchin priest and martyr (1912–1942)

Blessed Florian Stępniak OFMCap
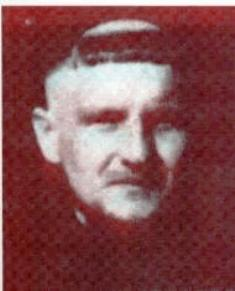

Priest & Martyr
- Born: Józef Stępniak; 3 January 1912; Żdżary
- Died: 12 August 1942 (aged 30); Dachau
- Beatified: 13 June 1999, Warsaw, Poland by Pope John Paul II
- Feast: 12 June

Florian Stępniak (born Józef Stępniak; 3 January 1912 – 12 August 1942) was a Polish Capuchin friar and Roman Catholic priest. One of the 108 Martyrs of World War II, he joined the Order of Friars Minor Capuchin in 1931. He was studying theology at the Catholic University of Lublin when he was arrested by the Gestapo and transferred to Sachsenhausen and Dachau, where he was later gassed to death.

== Biography ==
Stępniak was born in Żdżary to Pawel and Anna Misztal. He underwent primary education at Żdżary, completed high school and attended the College of Saint Fidelis in Łomża; during his schooling, he was a member of the Secular Franciscan Order. Stępniak joined the Order of Friars Minor Capuchin and begun his novitiate on 14 August 1931, taking the religious name Florian. He made his temporary vows on 15 August 1932, professing his solemn vows on 15 August 1935 after finishing his studies in philosophy. Once he finished his theological studies in Lublin, he was ordained a priest on 24 June 1938. He was then sent to the Catholic University of Lublin to study scripture.

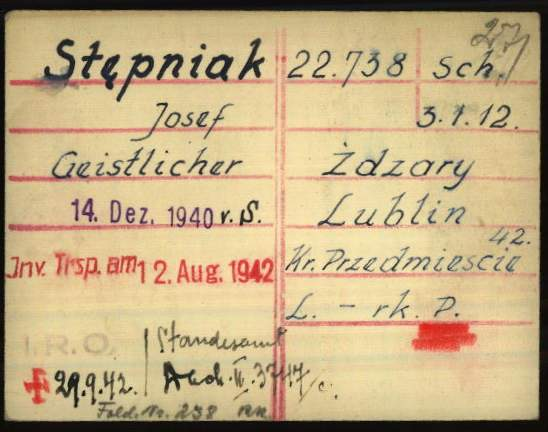
Registration card of Florian Stępniak as a prisoner at Dachau.

On 25 January 1940, Stępniak was arrested by the Gestapo and imprisoned at Lublin Castle. He was transferred to Sachsenhausen on 18 June 1940 and Dachau on 14 December 1940, receiving the prison number 22738 at the latter. After an illness in summer 1942, Stępniak was moved to the "invalid block"; he was executed with poison gas on 12 August 1942 and his body was likely cremated. He was beatified as part of the 108 Martyrs of World War II on 13 June 1999 at Warsaw by Pope John Paul II.

On 24 August 2022, a memorial for Stępniak was installed at Żdżary.

== See also ==
- List of Nazi-German concentration camps
- The Holocaust in Poland
- World War II casualties of Poland
