= Bieliny, Grójec County =

Bieliny
- Village
- Location within Poland
- Coordinates: 51°37′40″N 20°29′08″E
- Country: Poland
- Voivodeship: Masovian
- County: Grójec
- Gmina: Nowe Miasto nad Pilicą

Bieliny [bjɛˈlinɨ] is a village in the administrative district of Gmina Nowe Miasto nad Pilicą, within Grójec County, Masovian Voivodeship, in east-central Poland.
