= Borowina, Grójec County =

Borowina
- Village
- Location within Poland
- Coordinates: 51°34′13″N 20°37′18″E
- Country: Poland
- Voivodeship: Masovian
- County: Grójec
- Gmina: Nowe Miasto nad Pilicą

Borowina [bɔrɔˈvina] is a village in the administrative district of Gmina Nowe Miasto nad Pilicą, within Grójec County, Masovian Voivodeship, in east-central Poland.
