= Domaniewice, Grójec County =

Domaniewice
- Village
- Location within Poland
- Coordinates: 51°37′09″N 20°26′14″E
- Country: Poland
- Voivodeship: Masovian
- County: Grójec
- Gmina: Nowe Miasto nad Pilicą

Domaniewice [dɔmaɲɛˈvit͡sɛ] is a village in the administrative district of Gmina Nowe Miasto nad Pilicą, within Grójec County, Masovian Voivodeship, in east-central Poland.
