= Rudki, Grójec County =

Rudki
- Village
- Location within Poland
- Coordinates: 51°40′N 20°26′E
- Country: Poland
- Voivodeship: Masovian
- County: Grójec
- Gmina: Nowe Miasto nad Pilicą

Rudki [ˈrutki] is a village in the administrative district of Gmina Nowe Miasto nad Pilicą, within Grójec County, Masovian Voivodeship, in east-central Poland.
