= Rosocha, Masovian Voivodeship =

Rosocha
- Village
- Location within Poland
- Coordinates: 51°40′N 20°34′E
- Country: Poland
- Voivodeship: Masovian
- County: Grójec
- Gmina: Nowe Miasto nad Pilicą

Rosocha [rɔˈsɔxa] is a village in the administrative district of Gmina Nowe Miasto nad Pilicą, within Grójec County, Masovian Voivodeship, in east-central Poland.
