= Wólka Magierowa =

- Village
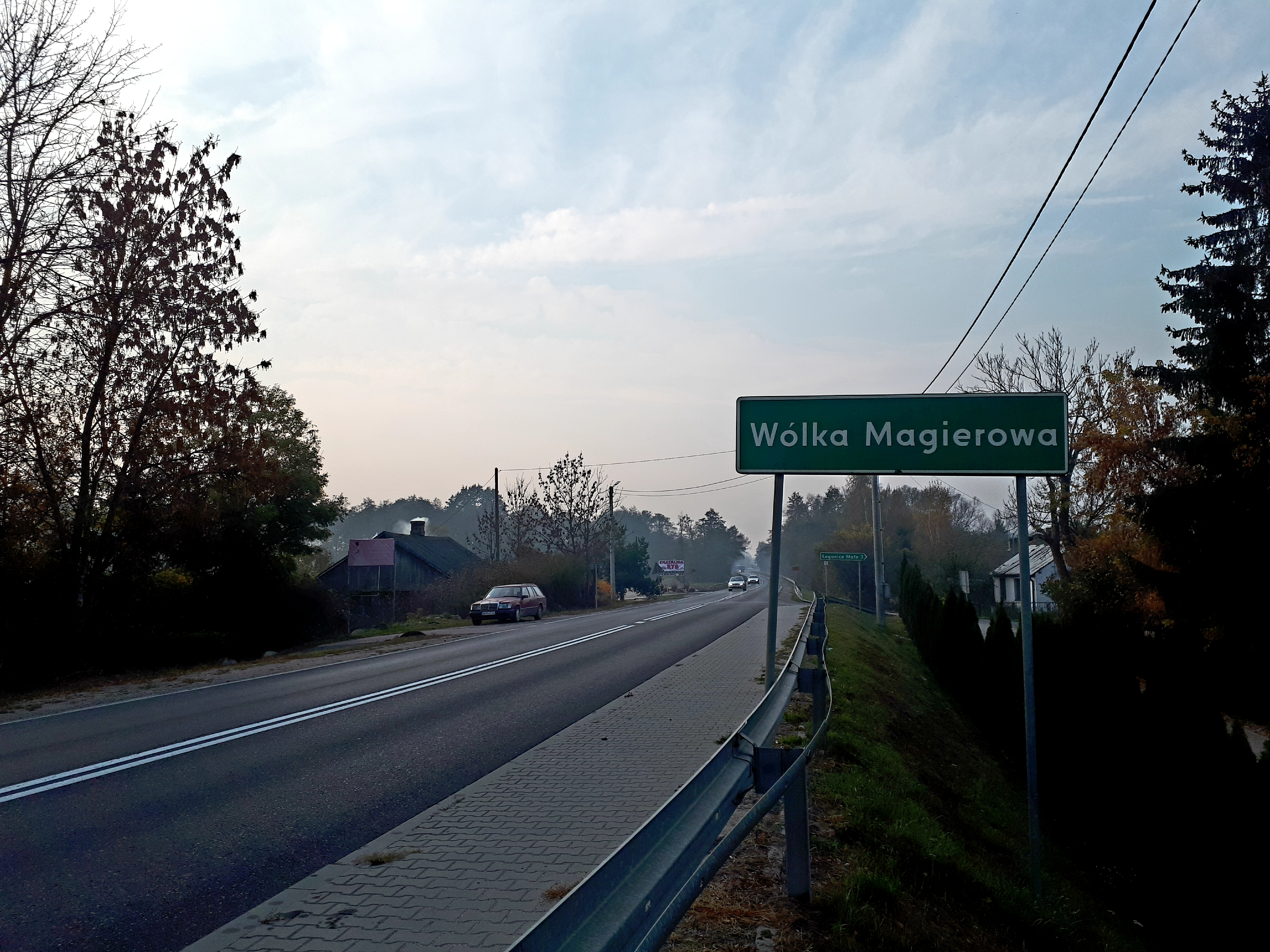

- Location within Poland
- Coordinates: 51°35′59″N 20°34′54″E
- Country: Poland
- Voivodeship: Masovian
- County: Grójec
- Gmina: Nowe Miasto nad Pilicą

Wólka Magierowa [ˈvulka maɡʲɛˈrɔva] is a village in the administrative district of Gmina Nowe Miasto nad Pilicą, within Grójec County, Masovian Voivodeship, in east-central Poland.
