= Gmina Nowe Miasto nad Pilicą =

Gmina Nowe Miasto nad Pilicą Nowe Miasto nad Pilicą Commune
- Gmina
- Coat of arms
- Interactive map of Gmina Nowe Miasto nad Pilicą
- Coordinates (Nowe Miasto nad Pilicą): 51°37′10″N 20°34′34″E
- Country: Poland
- Voivodeship: Masovian
- County: Grójec
- Seat: Nowe Miasto nad Pilicą

Area
  - Total: 158.47 km^{2} (61.19 sq mi)

Population (2006)
  - Total: 8,280
  - Density: 52.2/km^{2} (135/sq mi)
  - Urban: 3,832
  - Rural: 4,448
- Website: http://www.nowemiasto.pl/

Gmina Nowe Miasto nad Pilicą is an urban-rural gmina (administrative district) in Grójec County, Masovian Voivodeship, in east-central Poland. Its seat is the town of Nowe Miasto nad Pilicą, which lies approximately 34 kilometres (21 mi) south-west of Grójec and 73 km (45 mi) south-west of Warsaw.

The gmina covers an area of 158.47 square kilometres (61.2 sq mi), and as of 2006 its total population is 8,280 (out of which the population of Nowe Miasto nad Pilicą amounts to 3,832, and the population of the rural part of the gmina is 4,448).

== Villages ==
Apart from the town of Nowe Miasto nad Pilicą, Gmina Nowe Miasto nad Pilicą contains the villages and settlements of Bełek, Bieliny, Borowina, Dąbrowa, Domaniewice, Gilówka, Godzimierz, Gostomia, Jankowice, Józefów, Łęgonice, Nowe Bieliny, Nowe Łęgonice, Nowe Strzałki, Pobiedna, Promnik, Prosna, Rokitnica, Rosocha, Rudki, Sacin, Sańbórz, Strzałki, Świdrygały, Wał, Waliska, Wierzchy, Wola Pobiedzińska, Wólka Ligęzowska, Wólka Magierowa, Zalesie, Żdżarki and Żdżary.

== Neighbouring gminas ==
Gmina Nowe Miasto nad Pilicą is bordered by the gminas of Cielądz, Klwów, Mogielnica, Odrzywół, Rzeczyca, Sadkowice and Wyśmierzyce.
