= Nowe Strzałki =

- Village
- Location within Poland
- Coordinates: 51°39′28″N 20°24′35″E
- Country: Poland
- Voivodeship: Masovian
- County: Grójec
- Gmina: Nowe Miasto nad Pilicą
- Population: 120

Nowe Strzałki [ˈnɔvɛ ˈstʂau̯ki] is a village in the administrative district of Gmina Nowe Miasto nad Pilicą, within Grójec County, Masovian Voivodeship, in east-central Poland.
