= Żdżarki =

- Village
- Location within Poland
- Coordinates: 51°34′35″N 20°33′55″E
- Country: Poland
- Voivodeship: Masovian
- County: Grójec
- Gmina: Nowe Miasto nad Pilicą

Żdżarki [ˈʐd͡ʐarki] is a village in the administrative district of Gmina Nowe Miasto nad Pilicą, within Grójec County, Masovian Voivodeship, in east-central Poland.
