= Prosna, Masovian Voivodeship =

Prosna
- Village
- Location within Poland
- Coordinates: 51°34′42″N 20°32′18″E
- Country: Poland
- Voivodeship: Masovian
- County: Grójec
- Gmina: Nowe Miasto nad Pilicą

Prosna [ˈprɔsna] is a village in the administrative district of Gmina Nowe Miasto nad Pilicą, within Grójec County, Masovian Voivodeship, in east-central Poland.
