= Józefów, Gmina Nowe Miasto nad Pilicą =

Józefów
- Village
- Location within Poland
- Coordinates: 51°38′30″N 20°31′03″E
- Country: Poland
- Voivodeship: Masovian
- County: Grójec
- Gmina: Nowe Miasto nad Pilicą

Józefów (Polish pronunciation: [juˈzɛfuf]) is a village in the administrative district of Gmina Nowe Miasto nad Pilicą, within Grójec County, Masovian Voivodeship, in east-central Poland.
