= Sańbórz =

Village in Gmina Nowe Miasto nad Pilicą, Poland

- Village
- Location within Poland
- Coordinates: 51°39′48″N 20°25′17″E
- Country: Poland
- Voivodeship: Masovian
- County: Grójec
- Gmina: Nowe Miasto nad Pilicą

Sańbórz [ˈsaɲbuʂ] is a village in the administrative district of Gmina Nowe Miasto nad Pilicą, within Grójec County, Masovian Voivodeship, in east-central Poland.
