= Mątwy =

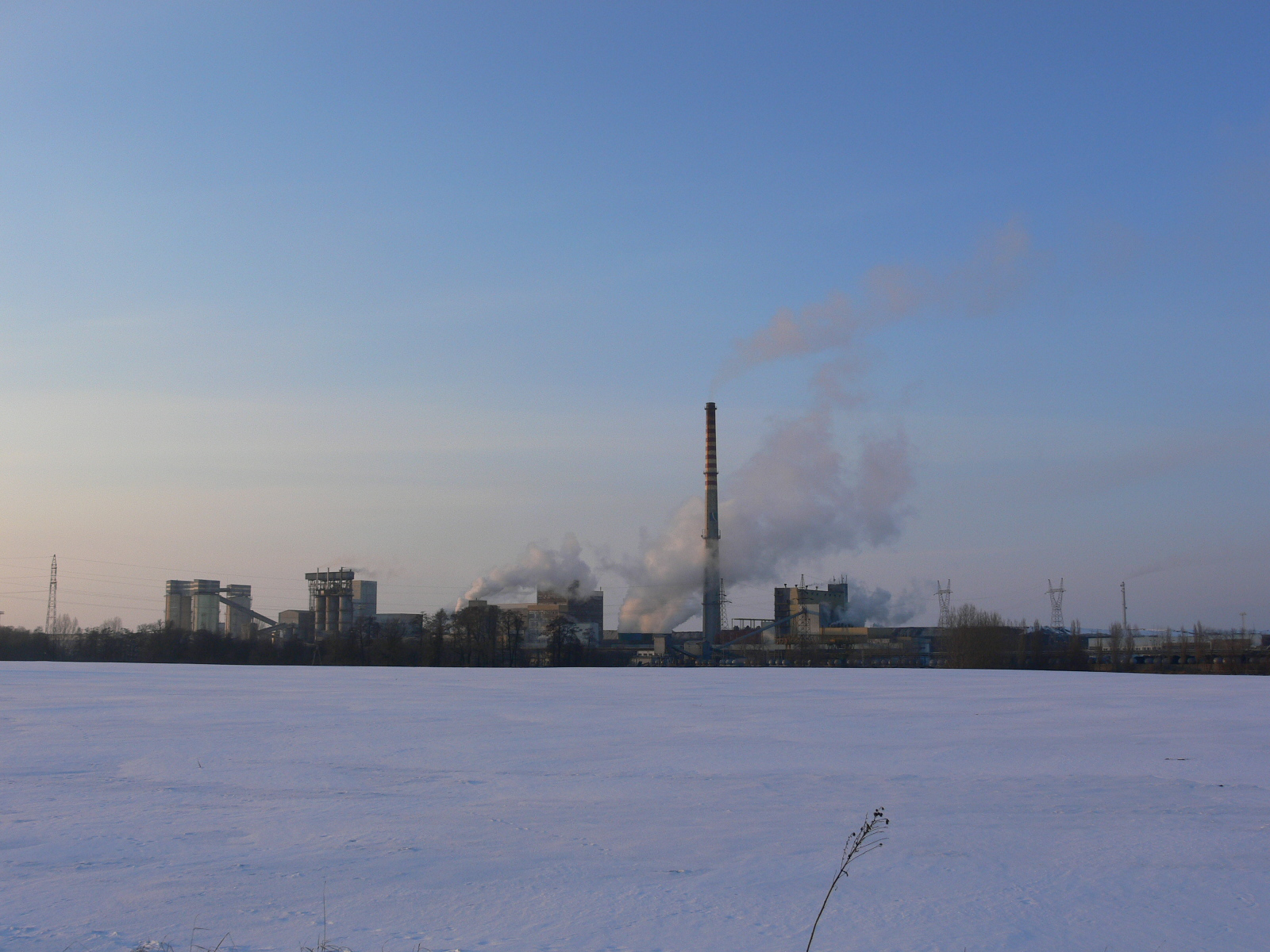
- A caustic soda production plant in Mątwy

- Location within Poland
- Coordinates: 52°45.3′N 18°15.3′E
- Country: Poland
- Voivodeship: Kuyavian–Pomeranian
- County: Inowrocław
- Town: Inowrocław
- Time zone: UTC+1 (CET)
  - Summer (DST): UTC+2 (CEST)

The village of Mątwy (German: 'Montwy') is located about 8 km south of Inowrocław in northern Poland. Formerly an independent village, it is a part of the town of Inowrocław.

== Industry ==
It is a significant caustic soda production site.

== History ==
=== Polish–Lithuanian Commonwealth ===
In 1666, Mątwy was the site of a battle in which the army of King John II Casimir Vasa was defeated in a rebellion led by Jerzy Sebastian Lubomirski known as 'Lubomirski's Rokosz'.

=== Prussia ===
Following the Congress of Vienna in 1815, Inowrocław and its surroundings were made a district of the Prussian Province of Posen. After the German defeat in World War I and the Treaty of Versailles becoming effective in 1920, the area was returned to Poland.

=== World War II ===
Following the Nazi invasion of Poland in 1939 and the establishment of the Reichsgau Wartheland, from 1940 onwards many prisoners of war were stationed in Mątwy. From December 1942 to August 1943 this included a Jewish forced labour camp working in the caustic soda factory.

Prisoner of war camps located here included a Heilag (repatriation camp) (closed September 1943), Stalag 391 (I D) (1941-December 1942), Oflag 10 (from December 1942), Oflag XXI-B (June - September 1943) and Stalag XXI-D (September - December 1943). Oflag 64 and Construction and Labour Battalion 146 for Soviet prisoners were also stationed here. Over 900 deaths were recorded during this period.
