= Wola Pobiedzińska =

- Village
- Location within Poland
- Coordinates: 51°38′N 20°38′E
- Country: Poland
- Voivodeship: Masovian
- County: Grójec
- Gmina: Nowe Miasto nad Pilicą
- Population: 150

Wola Pobiedzińska [ˈvɔla pɔbjɛˈd͡ʑiɲska] is a village in the administrative district of Gmina Nowe Miasto nad Pilicą, within Grójec County, Masovian Voivodeship, in east-central Poland.
