= Wał, Masovian Voivodeship =

Wał
- Village
- Location within Poland
- Coordinates: 51°38′35″N 20°27′40″E
- Country: Poland
- Voivodeship: Masovian
- County: Grójec
- Gmina: Nowe Miasto nad Pilicą

Wał [vau̯] is a village in the administrative district of Gmina Nowe Miasto nad Pilicą, within Grójec County, Masovian Voivodeship, in east-central Poland.
