= Bełek =

- Village
- Location within Poland
- Coordinates: 51°39′10″N 20°37′17″E
- Country: Poland
- Voivodeship: Masovian
- County: Grójec
- Gmina: Nowe Miasto nad Pilicą
- Population (2021): 91

Bełek [ˈbɛwɛk] is a village in the administrative district of Gmina Nowe Miasto nad Pilicą, within Grójec County, Masovian Voivodeship, in east-central Poland. The Lubanka river, a tributary of the Pilica, flows through the village. In 2021, the total population of the village was 78.
