= Battle of Mątwy =

1666 battle

- Part of the Lubomirski Rebellion
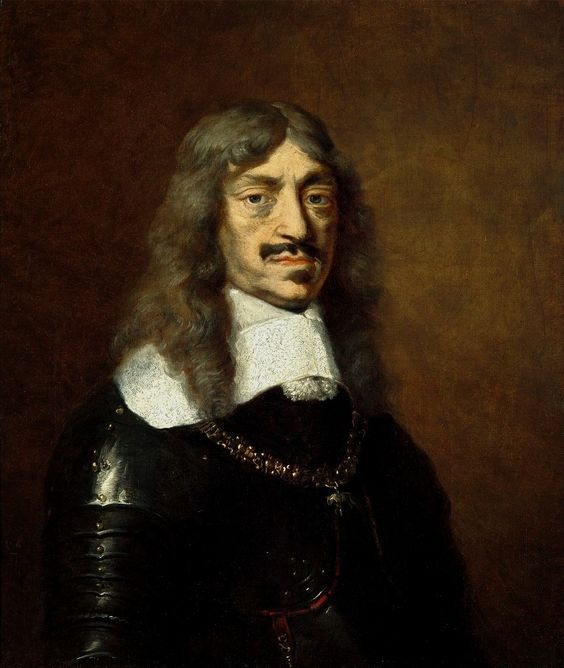
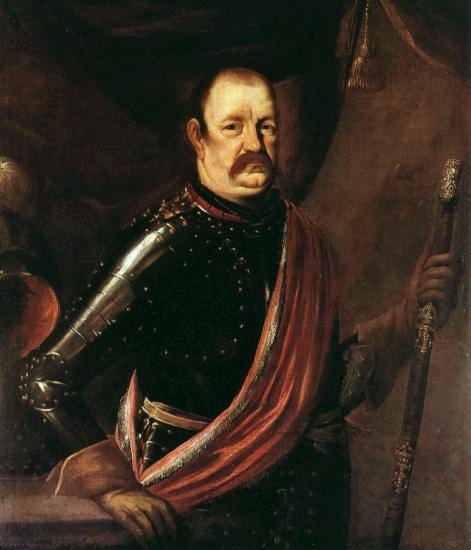
- King John II Casimir (left) and Hetman Jerzy Sebastian Lubomirski (right)
Date	13 July 1666
Location	Mątwy, Polish–Lithuanian Commonwealth
Result	Rebel victory

Belligerents
Royal Army	Rebels

Commanders and leaders
King John II Casimir; Stanisław Rewera Potocki; John Sobieski; Michał Kazimierz Pac	Jerzy Sebastian Lubomirski; Adam Ustrzycki; Krzysztof Grzymultowski; Stanisław Warszycki; Achacy Pisarski

Units involved
Royal Army: 3,000 dragoons; Polish cavalry; 7,000–9,000 infantry; Lithuanian cavalry; 30 pieces of artillery	Rebel Army: 1,200 dragoons; confederated comput units; Pospolite ruszenie from Greater and Lesser Poland

Strength
20,000	15,000

Casualties and losses
Approximately 4,000	Around 200

The Battle of Mątwy (Polish: Bitwa pod Mątwami) was the biggest and bloodiest battle of the so-called Lubomirski Rokosz, a rebellion against Polish King John II Casimir, initiated by a magnate and hetman, Jerzy Sebastian Lubomirski. It took place on 13 July 1666 in the village of Mątwy (now a district of Inowrocław), and ended in rebel victory. The royal army of the Polish–Lithuanian Commonwealth lost almost 4000 of its best and most experienced soldiers, who were murdered by Lubomirski's men. Rebel losses are estimated at 200.

== Battle ==
On 12 July, first royal divisions appeared in Mątwy. A skirmish with rebel forces, which guarded the Noteć river ford soon took place. On the next day, other royal forces, consisting mostly of Lithuanian units appeared. Taking advantage of a fog, several hundred cavalrymen managed to cross the river, and soon afterwards, remaining royal divisions began to cross the Noteć. Lithuanian hetman Michał Kazimierz Pac however missed a chance to shatter rebel army, and decided to wait for Crown divisions.

The defeat of royal forces was the result of several mistakes. Other from Pac's delay, royal leaders did not know exact positions of the rebels, thinking that their main units were located far from the ford. Furthermore, they did not get acquainted with the topography of the area.

King John II Casimir, unaware of the danger, ordered the crossing of the whole army, which consisted of some 20,000 men. First, Lithuanian dragoons and reiters got to the other bank of the Noteć, followed by cavalry and Polish dragoons (altogether, some 4000 men). Next were two cavalry divisions of Mikolaj Hieronim Sieniawski and John Sobieski. There was no cooperation between all these units, and after crossing the Noteć, royal army created a battle formation, with Lithuanian cavalry on the left, Crown dragoons in the middle and Crown cavalry on the right. Sobieski made a fatal mistake, placing the cavalry in front of the dragoons, as before the end of the battle, retreating cavalrymen trampled the foot soldiers.

Meanwhile, Zarudny, who commanded front guard of the rebels, managed to retreat to a nearby hill, which he kept despite Lithuanian attacks. Soon afterwards, rebel cavalry, pospolite ruszenie and other forces joined Zarudny and his men.

The cavalry of Sieniawski and Sobieski, pressed by other units, which were trying to cross the river, got mixed with dragoons, located in the center. At the same time, rebel cavalry charged, followed by pospolite ruszenie from Greater Poland and Lesser Poland. This attack took the royal army by complete surprise: their cavalry was quickly destroyed, and signal to retreat was announced. Retreating cavalrymen trampled the dragoons: Sobieski tried to save the situation by ordering two cavalry units to attack, but this failed, and the future king himself had to retreat, narrowly escaping death.

Lithuanian cavalry also retreated, leaving the dragoons to themselves. The river ford was filled with equipment, men and their horses, so under the circumstances, Jan Kazimierz ordered a general retreat, abandoning those units which continued to fight. Following the battle, the rebels mercilessly murdered thousands of their prisoners, including some of the best soldiers of Poland and Lithuania.

== Consequences of the battle ==
The bloodbath and subsequent mass murder resulted in the deaths of 3873 royal soldiers and 200 rebels. Most of the victims were the most experienced and best military men of the two nations, including soldiers of Stefan Czarniecki, who had fought in Ukraine, Muscovy and Denmark. Czarniecki himself did not participate in the battle, as he had died a few months before.

Two weeks after the battle the Agreement of Łęgonice was signed. On 8 August 1666 John II Casimir and Lubomirski met at Jaroszyn.

== Armies and their commanders ==
=== Rebel forces under Jerzy Sebastian Lubomirski (15000 soldiers) ===
- 1200 dragoons commanded personally by Lubomirski,
- confederated comput units under Adam Ustrzycki,
- pospolite ruszenie from Greater and Lesser Poland, commanded by Krzysztof Grzymultowski, Stanislaw Warszycki and Achacy Pisarski.

=== Royal forces under King John II Casimir (20000 soldiers) ===
- 3000 dragoons under Crown Hetman Stanisław Rewera Potocki,
- Polish cavalry under Jan Sobieski,
- 7000–9000 infantry,
- Lithuanian cavalry under Hetman Michał Kazimierz Pac,
- 30 pieces of artillery

== Sources ==
- Listy Sobieskiego do Marysieńki [1] (list z 14 lipca 1666 r.)
- Wiesław Majewski "Studia i Materiały do Historii Wojskowości" t. VII
- Ludwik Stomma, Polskie złudzenia narodowe, Poznań 2006
- Tadeusz Wasilewski "Ostatni Waza na polskim tronie"
- Jan Chryzostom Pasek – "Pamiętniki"
- Mała Encyklopedia Wojskowa, Wydanie I, Rok 1967
