= Żdżary, Grójec County =

Żdżary
- Village
- Location within Poland
- Coordinates: 51°39′N 20°27′E
- Country: Poland
- Voivodeship: Masovian
- County: Grójec
- Gmina: Nowe Miasto nad Pilicą

Żdżary [ˈʐd͡ʐarɨ] is a village in the administrative district of Gmina Nowe Miasto nad Pilicą, within Grójec County, Masovian Voivodeship, in east-central Poland.
