= Łęgonice =

- Village
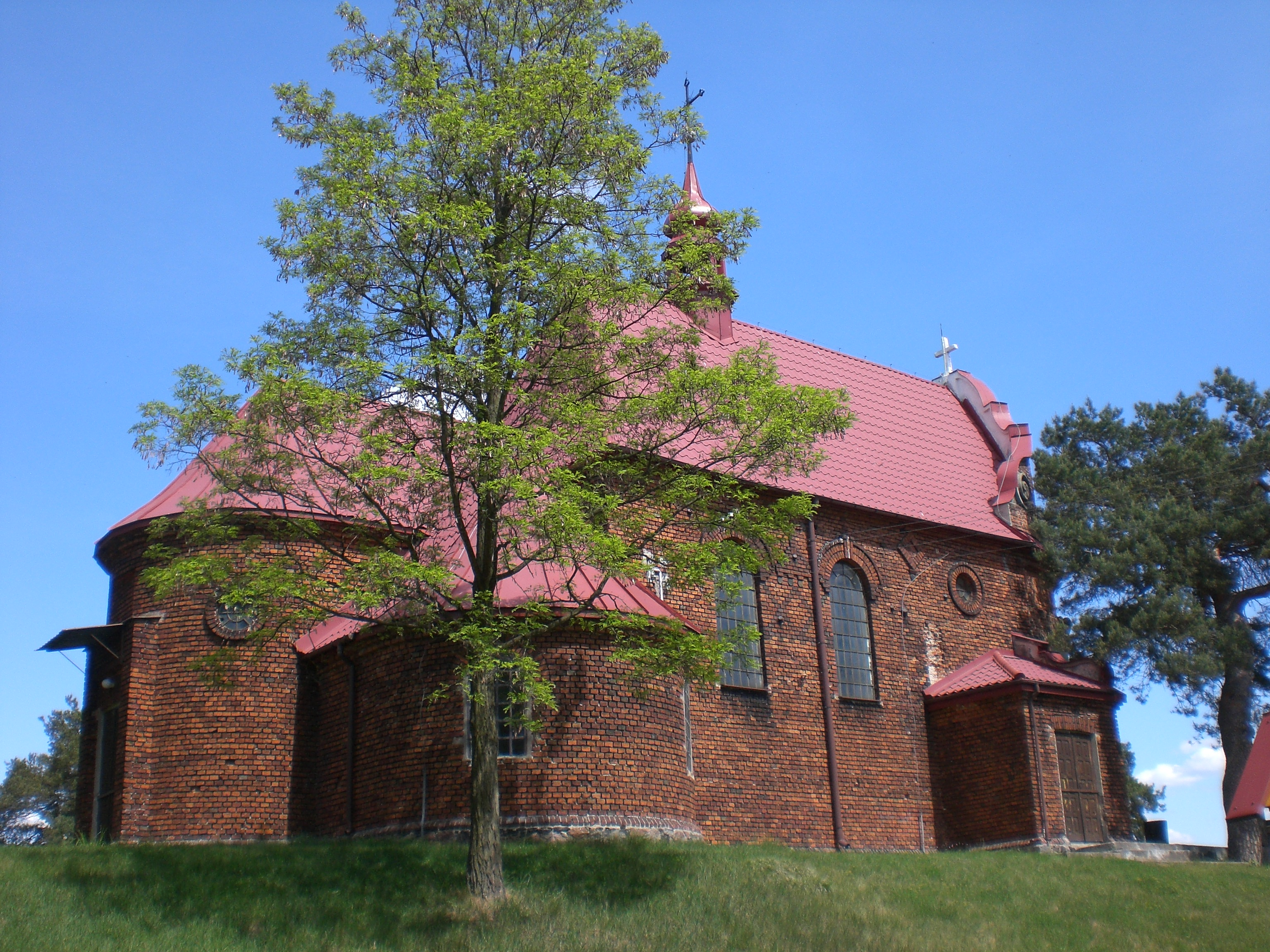
- Saint Roch church in Łęgonice

- Location within Poland
- Coordinates: 51°37′N 20°32′E
- Country: Poland
- Voivodeship: Masovian
- County: Grójec
- Gmina: Nowe Miasto nad Pilicą

Population
  - Total: 440
- Time zone: UTC+1 (CET)
  - Summer (DST): UTC+2 (CEST)
- Vehicle registration: WGR

Łęgonice [wɛnɡɔˈnit͡sɛ] is a village in the administrative district of Gmina Nowe Miasto nad Pilicą, within Grójec County, Masovian Voivodeship, in east-central Poland.
