= Thomas Farriner =

English baker and churchwarden (1615–1670)

- Born: c. 1615
- Died: 20 December 1670 (aged 54–55)
- Occupations: Baker; churchwarden
- Known for: Great Fire of London

Thomas Farriner (sometimes written as Faynor, Faryner or Farynor; c. 1615 – 20 December 1670) was an English baker and churchwarden in 17th century London. Allegedly, his bakery in Pudding Lane was the starting point for the Great Fire of London on 2 September 1666.

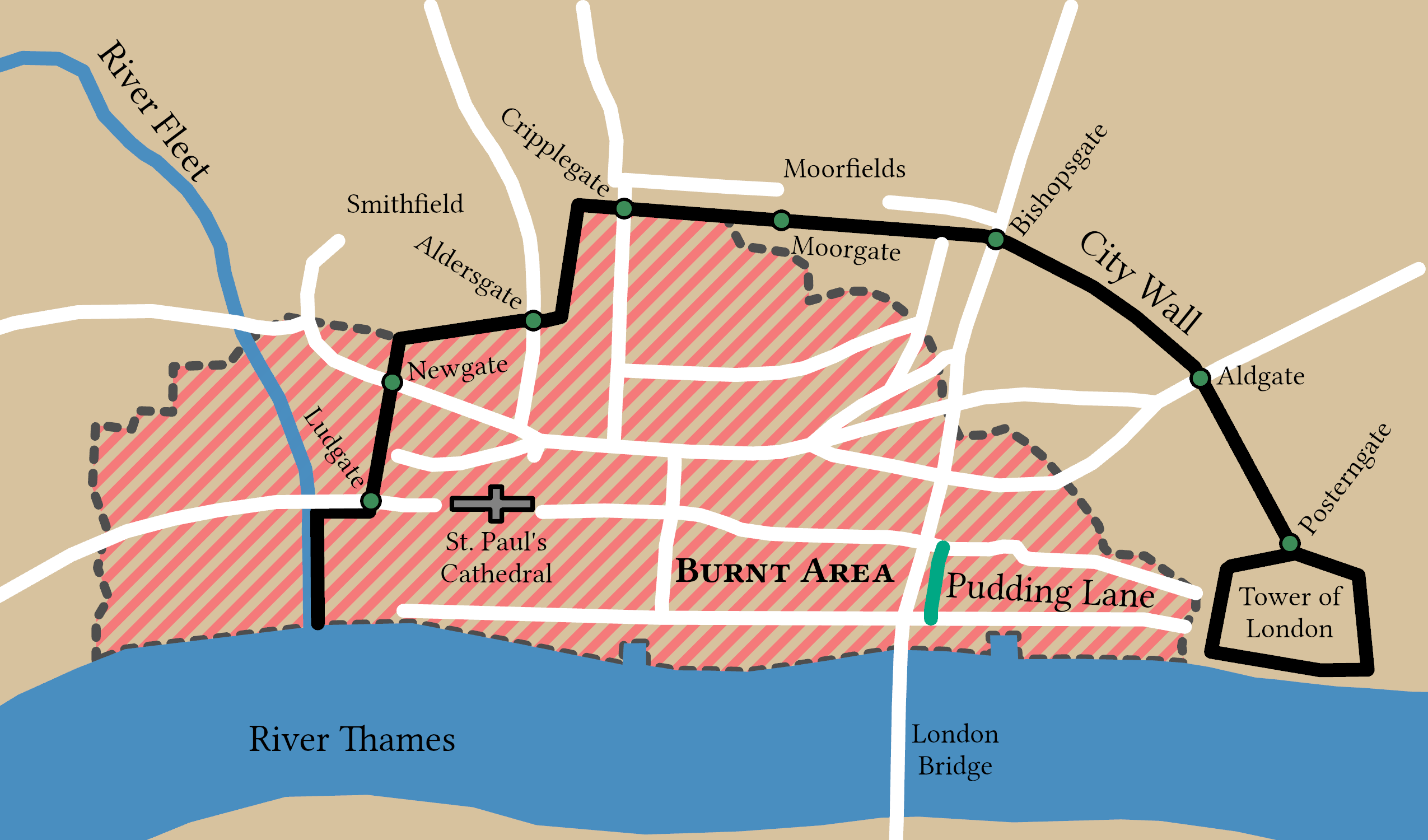
Map showing the extent of the Great Fire

== Career ==
Farriner joined the Baker's Company in 1637, and had his own shop by 1649. By the time of the Great Fire of London, Thomas Farriner was a well-known baker in the City of London, who provided bread for the Royal Navy during the Anglo-Dutch war.

== Great Fire of London ==
In the early hours of 2 September 1666, in his house on Pudding Lane, Farriner was awakened by smoke billowing under the door of his bedroom. His bakery downstairs, it turned out, had caught fire. Farriner and his daughter escaped out of an upstairs window, but their maid refused to follow because she was frightened of falling onto the street. When their house burned down, she died, becoming the first victim of the Great Fire of London.

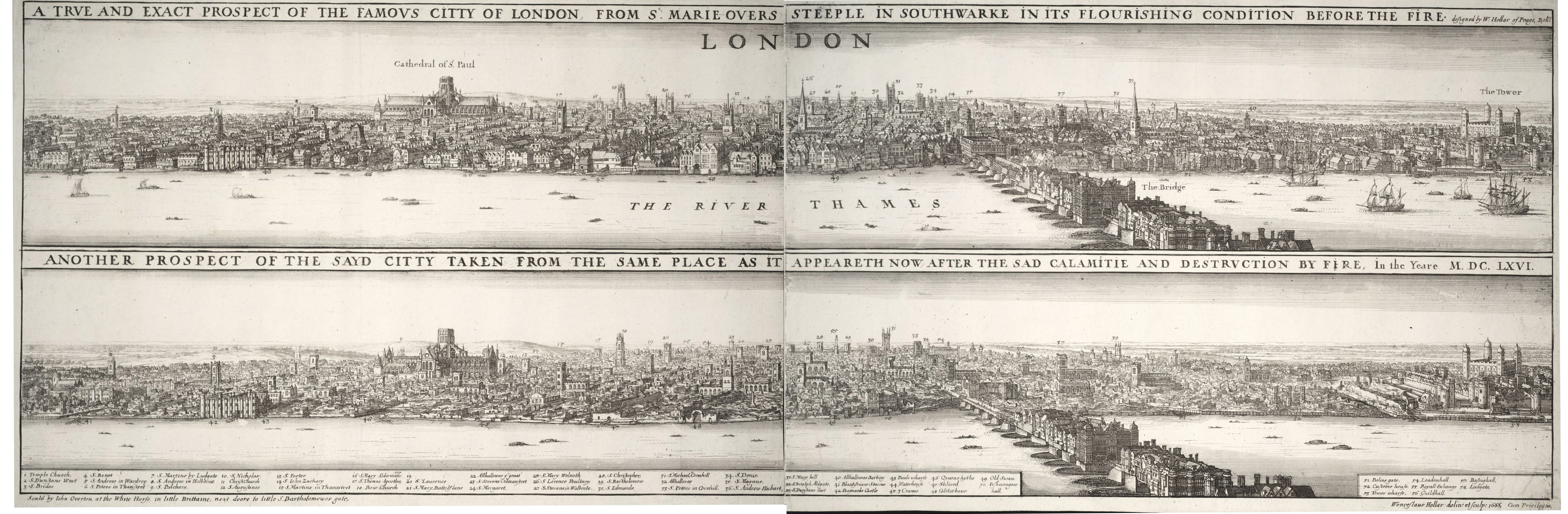
Wenceslas Hollar – London before and after the fire

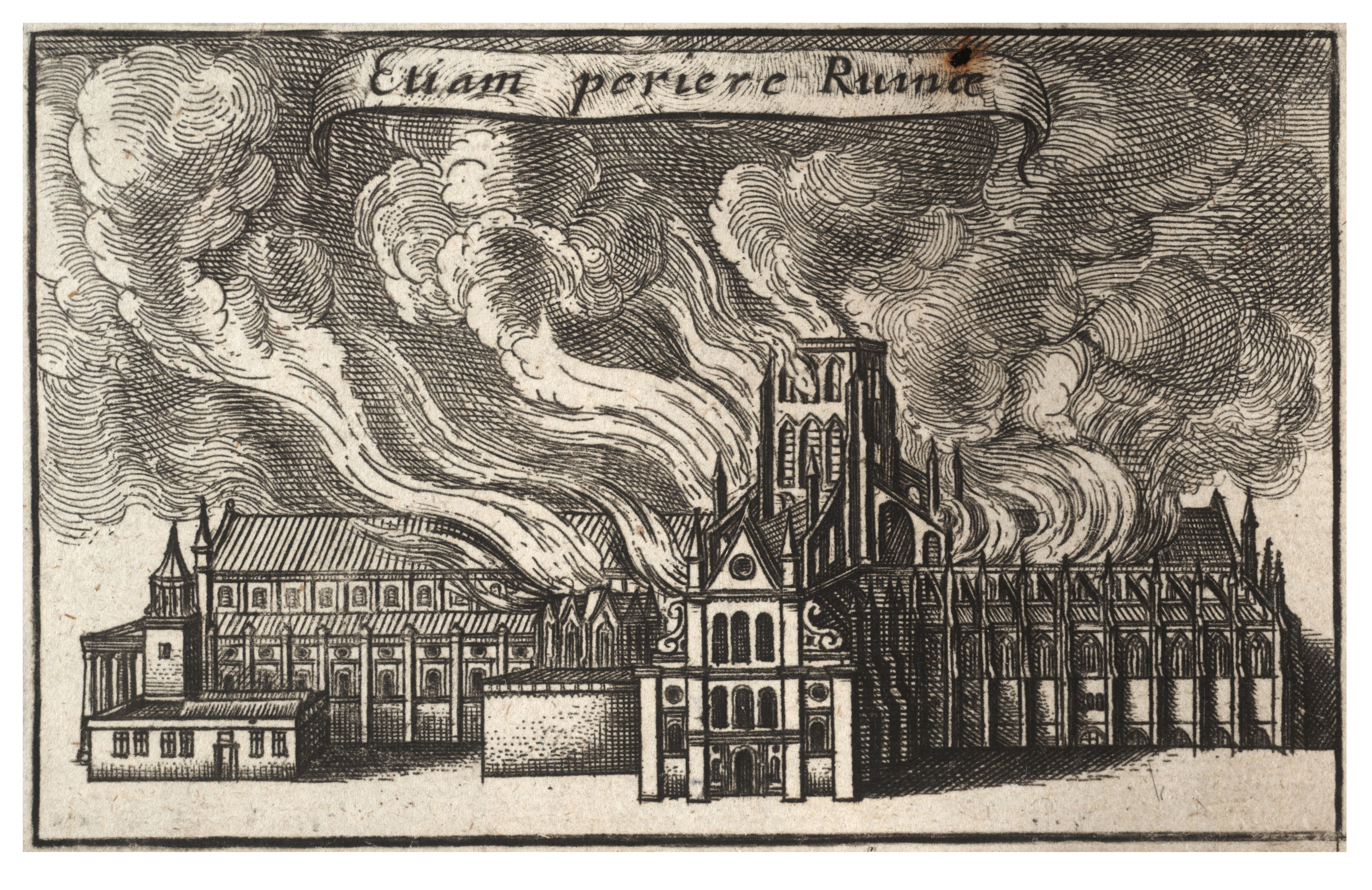
Wenceslas Hollar – St Paul's burning (Lex ignea)

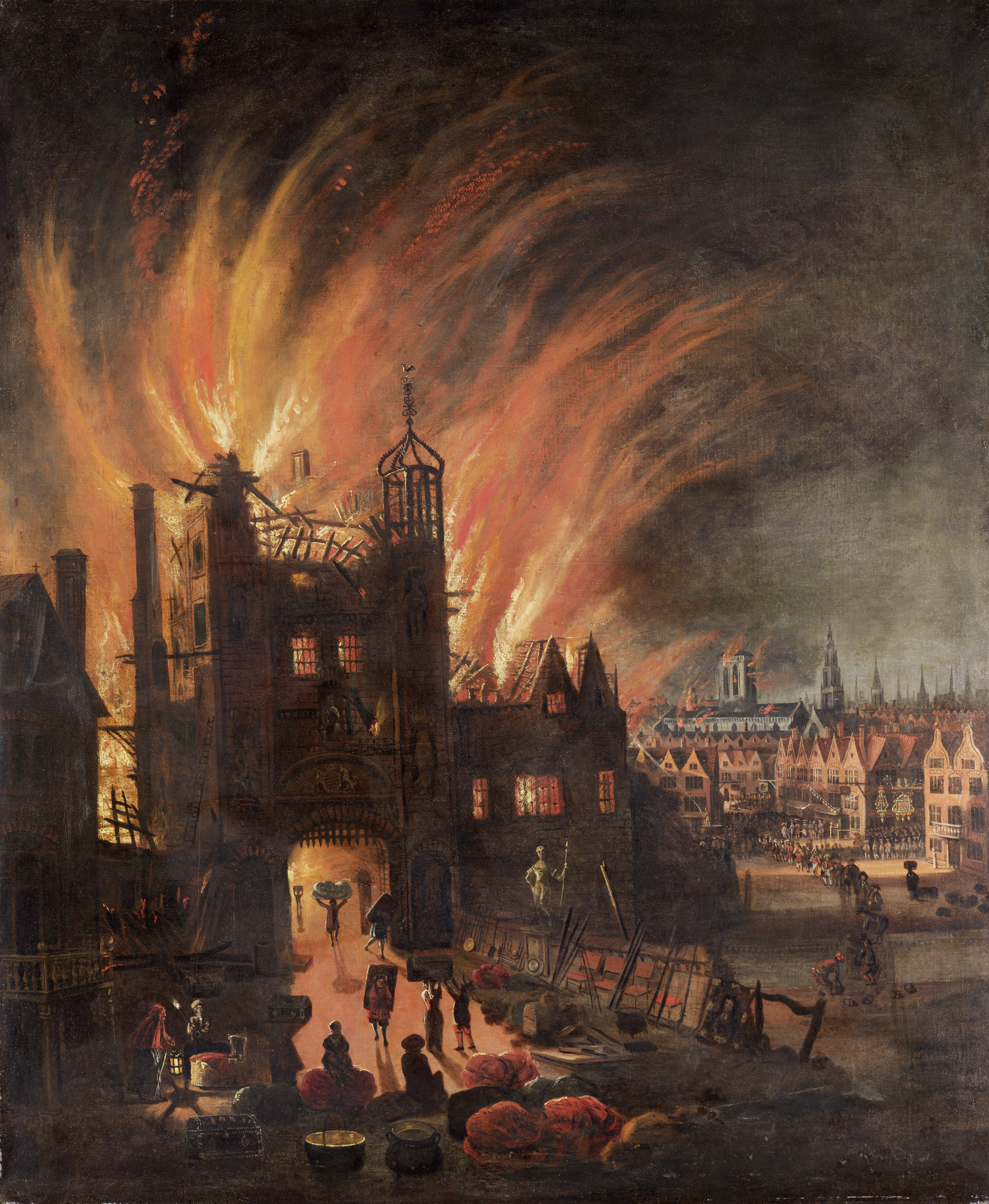
The Great Fire of London, with Ludgate and Old St. Paul's (c. 1670)

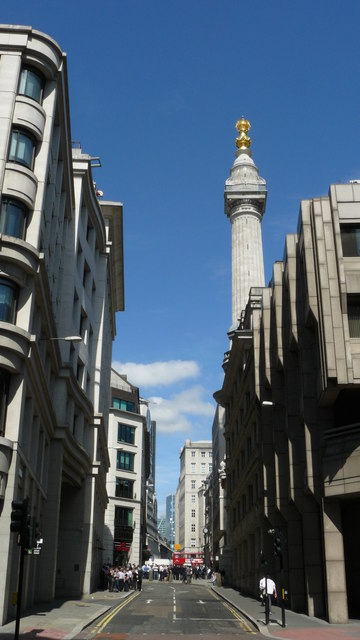
Pudding Lane with the memorial column marking the ignition point of the fire of London

After the fire, he rebuilt his business in Pudding Lane. He and his children signed the Bill falsely accusing Frenchman Robert Hubert of starting the fire.

Farriner died in 1670, aged 54–55, slightly over four years after the Great Fire of London.

== In popular culture ==
Thomas Farriner and his daughter are featured characters in the 2016 musical Bumblescratch.

Andrew Buchan played Farriner in the 2014 TV series The Great Fire.

In the Heroes of Olympus series by Rick Riordan, Farriner (written as "Faynor") is a demigod son of Hephaestus, the last child of Hephaestus able to create and control fire before Leo Valdez, one of the main protagonists in the series, and that his inability to control his power was what started the great fire.
