= Robert Hubert =

French watchmaker and scapegoat for the Fire of London

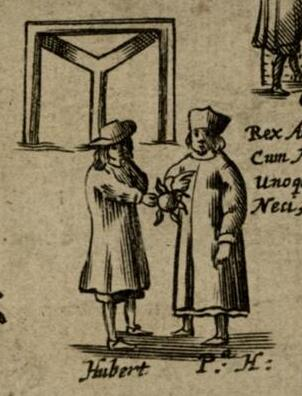
Hubert in the Pyrotechnica Loyalana (1667) receiving a fire-bomb from a Jesuit (perhaps William Harcourt, a Jesuit hanged after the Popish Plot), in front of a gallows.

Robert Hubert (c. 1640 – 27 October 1666) was a watchmaker from Rouen, France, who was executed following his false confession of starting the Great Fire of London.

== Great Fire of London ==
Between 2 and 6 September 1666, a major fire broke out in Pudding Lane in the City of London and proceeded to destroy around 80 percent of the old city.

== Confession ==
Hubert’s confession, at first, was of starting a fire in Westminster. However, this story proved unsatisfactory, and his confession changed upon learning that the fire never reached Westminster. Having learned that the fire started at Pudding Lane in the house of the baker Thomas Farriner (or Farynor), he then claimed to have thrown a crude fire grenade through the open window of the Farriner bakery. He claimed to have acted with accomplices, who stopped the water cocks to sabotage the effort to put out the fire. Hubert's confessed motive was, apparently, that he was a French spy and an agent of the Pope.

== Trial and execution ==
Hubert's confessions never seemed convincing. His retroactive change of story to fit the facts was not the only reason however. Hubert had not even been in London at the time that the fire broke out — he had not even arrived in England until two days after the fire started. That he was not in the country at the time of the outbreak of fire is not in doubt as testified, years later, by a captain of the Swedish ship the Maid of Stockholm, that he personally had landed Hubert ashore two days after the outbreak of the fire. Having never seen the Farriner bakery, Hubert also did not know that it had no windows. What is more, he was judged so severely crippled that it would have been impossible for him to throw the claimed grenade.

Hubert's confession is often attributed to mental simplicity, an inability to understand what it was he was doing; a kind of "Confessing Sam" (Note: "Confessing Sam" is the term in criminal psychology for a person who makes a false confession after a particularly widely publicised crime has taken place.) tendency. One source claims, though, that the confession was coerced "probably by an extreme form of torture".

As The London Gazette suggests, some put the disaster down to chance:

[...] notwithstanding which suspicion, the manner of the burning all along in a Train, and so blowen forwards in all its way by strong Winds, make us conclude the whole was an effect of an unhappy chance, or to speak better, the heavy hand of God upon us for our sins [...]

Despite the many obvious flaws and impossibilities in Hubert's confession, a scapegoat was needed. Even the king, Charles II, was suspected of having instigated it, in order to punish the people of London for the execution of his father. Nationalism was high with Britain embroiled in the Second Anglo-Dutch War, and many foreigners—Dutch, French, Spanish, Irish—were suspect. Frenchmen were particularly vulnerable, as illustrated by the murder of a Frenchman whose tennis balls were mistaken for 'balls of fire'. Hubert, a foreigner and Frenchman, was a chief suspect, as suggested by the London Gazette:

[...] Strangers, Dutch and French were, during the fire, apprehended, upon suspicion that they contributed mischievously to it, who are all imprisoned, and Informations prepared to make a severe inquisition [...]

Catholics were also chief suspects, and accusations were so formal as to be added to the Monument in 1668, which stayed (with brief interruptions) until 1830:

[...] the most dreadful Burning of this City; begun and carried on by the treachery and malice of the Popish faction.

Hubert had convenient attributes. He was convicted and sentenced to death at the Old Bailey.

Despite the contradictoriness of both Hubert's account and of public opinion, the Farriner family, in whose bakery the fire had started, was naturally under pressure — they needed to show that their ovens had been doused properly— and three members of the family were present in the jury. Thomas Farriner stated that, after midnight, he had:

gone through every room and found no fire, but in one chimney, where the room was paved with bricks, which fire I diligently raked up in embers [...] no window or door might let wind disturb them and that it was absolutely set on fire on purpose[...]

Few of the jury at his trial actually believed Hubert guilty. One contemporary account claims that Hubert was "only accused upon his own confession; yet neither the judges nor any present at the trial did believe him guilty, but that he was a poor distracted wretch, weary of his life, and chose to part with it in this way." The jury stated that he did not have "the fear of God before his eyes, but [was] moved and led away by the instigation of the devil".

Hubert was hanged at Tyburn, London, on 27 October 1666. As his body was being handed to the Company of Barber-Surgeons for dissection, it was torn apart by a crowd of Londoners.

It was hoped that with Hubert's death, "the talk of plots and conspiracies might die with him". In 1667, after the need for scapegoats had died down, the fire was officially attributed to 'the hand of God, a great wind and a very dry season...'. One source attributes the accident to a spark falling upon a bale of straw in the bakery of the Farriners, and many assume the spark to have come from the oven of the Farriners' bakery.
