= Vivente rege =

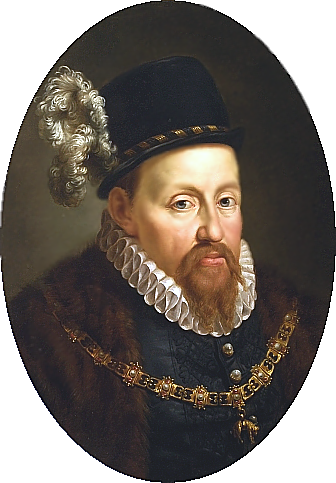
Sigismund II Augustus was elected vivente rege in 1529, eighteen years before his father's death.

Vivente rege (Latin: "with the king (still) living") (Note: Ablatives of present participle vivens + rex) is a form of monarchical election, where the monarch's successor, usually of the same dynasty, is elected before the death of the incumbent. It was an important element of politics in the Kingdom of Poland during the period when the king was elected by the nobility (the szlachta). Some monarchs attempted to push through the elections of their chosen heirs during their lives. The szlachta resisted these attempts, on the grounds that this form of succession would lead to absolute monarchy.

== See also ==
- Bishop coadjutor
