= Albert VI of Bavaria =

German nobleman

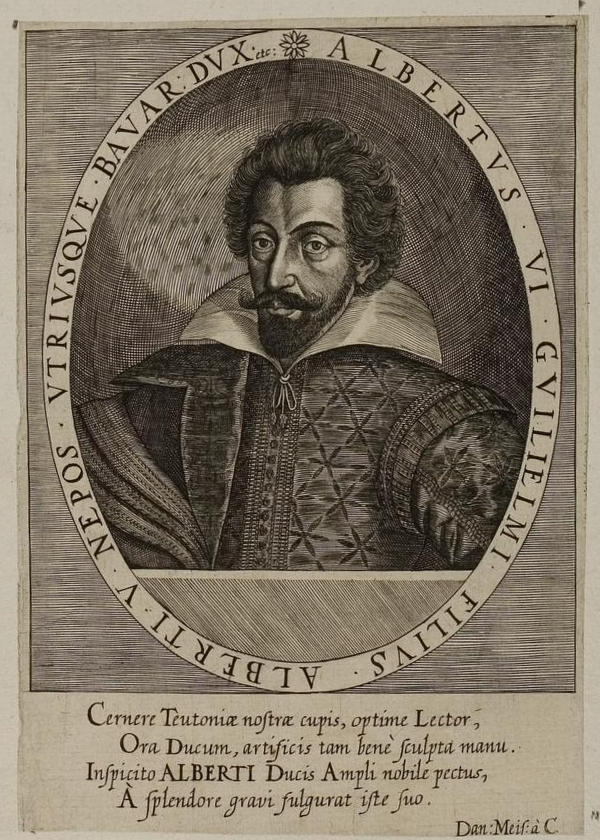
Duke Albert VI

Albert VI of Bavaria (German: Albrecht VI., der Leuchtenberger, Landgraf von Bayern-Leuchtenberg; 26 February 1584 – 5 July 1666) son of William V, Duke of Bavaria and Renata of Lorraine, born and died in Munich.

== Biography ==
Albert was 1651–1654 the regent for his young nephew Elector Ferdinand Maria. Through his wife Mechthilde, Albrecht came into possession of the Landgraviate of Leuchtenberg, which he exchanged in 1650 for the Reichsgrafschaft (county) Haag. After the death of his son Maximilian Heinrich, Haag reverted to Bavaria.
Albert's successor in Leuchtenberg was Maximilian Philipp Hieronymus of Bavaria, the second son of Elector Maximilian I. After Maximilian's death, Leuchtenberg was also united with Bavaria.

Albrecht died on July 5, 1666, in Munich and was buried in the pilgrimage church in Altötting.

== Issue ==
In 1612 married Princess Mechthilde of Leuchtenberg (24 October 1588 – 1 June 1634), place of burial: Wallfahrtkirche Altötting. They had 5 children:

1. Maria Renata, Duchess of Bayern-Leuchtenberg (3 August 1616 – 1 March 1630)
2. Karl Johann Franz, Duke of Bayern-Leuchtenberg (10 November 1618 – 19 May 1640)
3. Ferdinand Wilhelm, Duke of Bayern-Leuchtenberg (25 August 1620 – 23 October 1629)
4. Maximilian Heinrich, Archbishop and Elector of Cologne (8 October 1621 – 3 June 1688)
5. Sigmund Albrecht, Bishop of Freising and Regensburg 1668 (5 August 1623 – 4 November 1685)

== Ancestors ==
Albert's ancestors in three generations
Albert VI of Bavaria	Father: William V, Duke of Bavaria	Paternal Grandfather: Albert V, Duke of Bavaria	Paternal Great-grandfather: William IV, Duke of Bavaria
Albert VI of Bavaria	Father: William V, Duke of Bavaria	Paternal Grandfather: Albert V, Duke of Bavaria	Paternal Great-grandmother: Jakobaea of Baden
Albert VI of Bavaria	Father: William V, Duke of Bavaria	Paternal Grandmother: Anna of Austria	Paternal Great-grandfather: Ferdinand I, Holy Roman Emperor
Albert VI of Bavaria	Father: William V, Duke of Bavaria	Paternal Grandmother: Anna of Austria	Paternal Great-grandmother: Anna of Bohemia and Hungary
Albert VI of Bavaria	Mother: Renata of Lorraine	Maternal Grandfather: Francis I, Duke of Lorraine	Maternal Great-grandfather: Antoine, Duke of Lorraine
Albert VI of Bavaria	Mother: Renata of Lorraine	Maternal Grandfather: Francis I, Duke of Lorraine	Maternal Great-grandmother: Renée of Bourbon-Montpensier
Albert VI of Bavaria	Mother: Renata of Lorraine	Maternal Grandmother: Christina of Denmark	Maternal Great-grandfather: Christian II of Denmark
Albert VI of Bavaria	Mother: Renata of Lorraine	Maternal Grandmother: Christina of Denmark	Maternal Great-grandmother: Isabella of Burgundy

Preceded by Maximilian I. (Prince Elector)	Prince Administrator (Kuradministrator) of Bavaria; 1651–1654	Succeeded by Ferdinand Maria (Prince Elector)
