= 1660 =

1660 in various calendars
- Gregorian calendar: 1660; MDCLX
- Ab urbe condita: 2413
- Armenian calendar: 1109; ԹՎ ՌՃԹ
- Assyrian calendar: 6410
- Balinese saka calendar: 1581–1582
- Bengali calendar: 1066–1067
- Berber calendar: 2610
- English Regnal year: 11 Cha. 2 – 12 Cha. 2
- Buddhist calendar: 2204
- Burmese calendar: 1022
- Byzantine calendar: 7168–7169
- Chinese calendar: 己亥年 (Earth Pig); 4357 or 4150 — to — 庚子年 (Metal Rat); 4358 or 4151
- Coptic calendar: 1376–1377
- Discordian calendar: 2826
- Ethiopian calendar: 1652–1653
- Hebrew calendar: 5420–5421
- Hindu calendars
- Vikram Samvat: 1716–1717
- Shaka Samvat: 1581–1582
- Kali Yuga: 4760–4761
- Holocene calendar: 11660
- Igbo calendar: 660–661
- Iranian calendar: 1038–1039
- Islamic calendar: 1070–1071
- Japanese calendar: Manji 3 (万治３年)
- Javanese calendar: 1582–1583
- Julian calendar: Gregorian minus 10 days
- Korean calendar: 3993
- Minguo calendar: 252 before ROC 民前252年
- Nanakshahi calendar: 192
- Thai solar calendar: 2202–2203
- Tibetan calendar: ས་མོ་ཕག་ལོ་ (female Earth-Boar); 1786 or 1405 or 633 — to — ལྕགས་ཕོ་བྱི་བ་ལོ་ (male Iron-Rat); 1787 or 1406 or 634

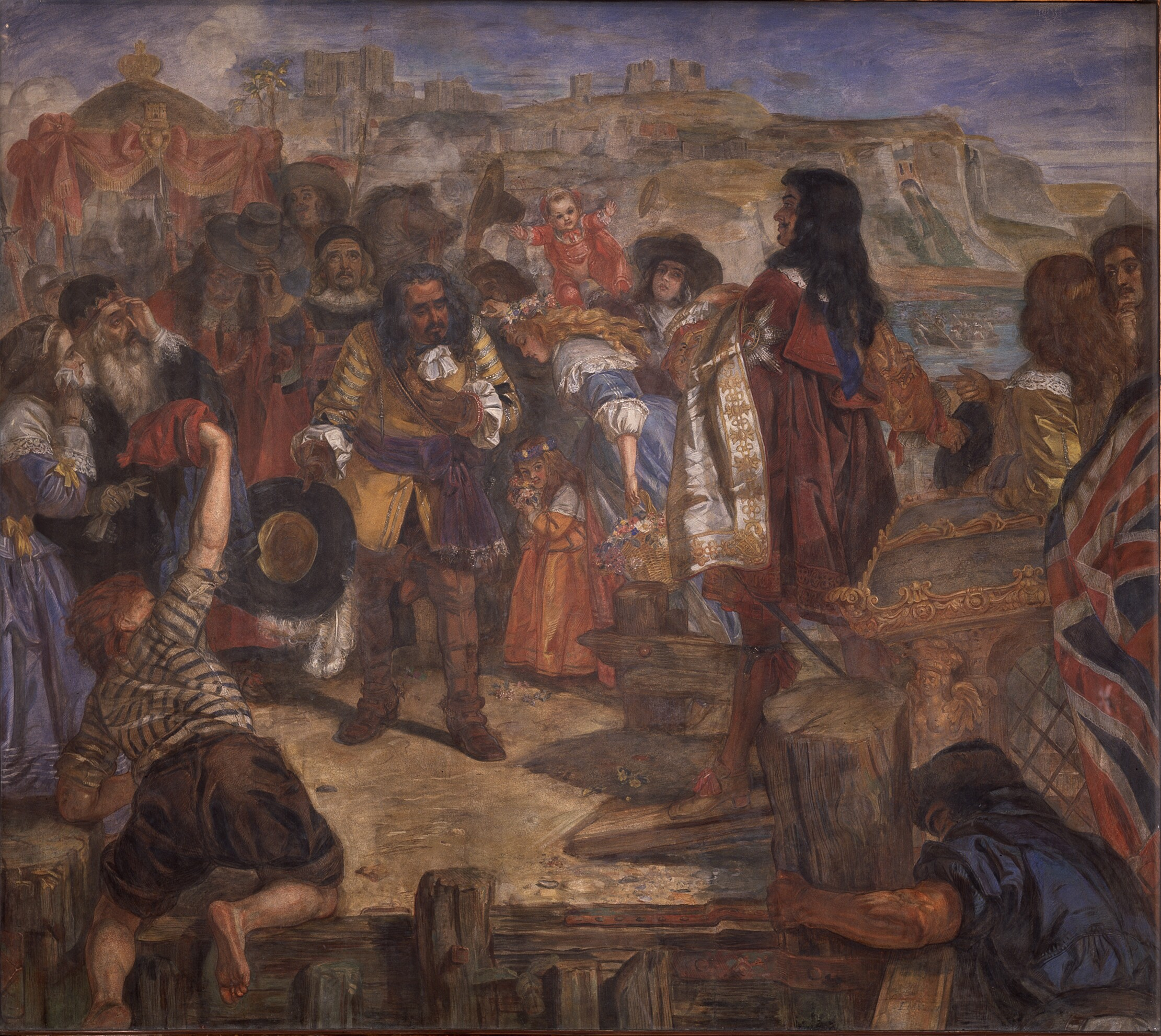
May 25: Stuart Restoration: King Charles II lands at Dover and sets foot on English soil in his return from exile

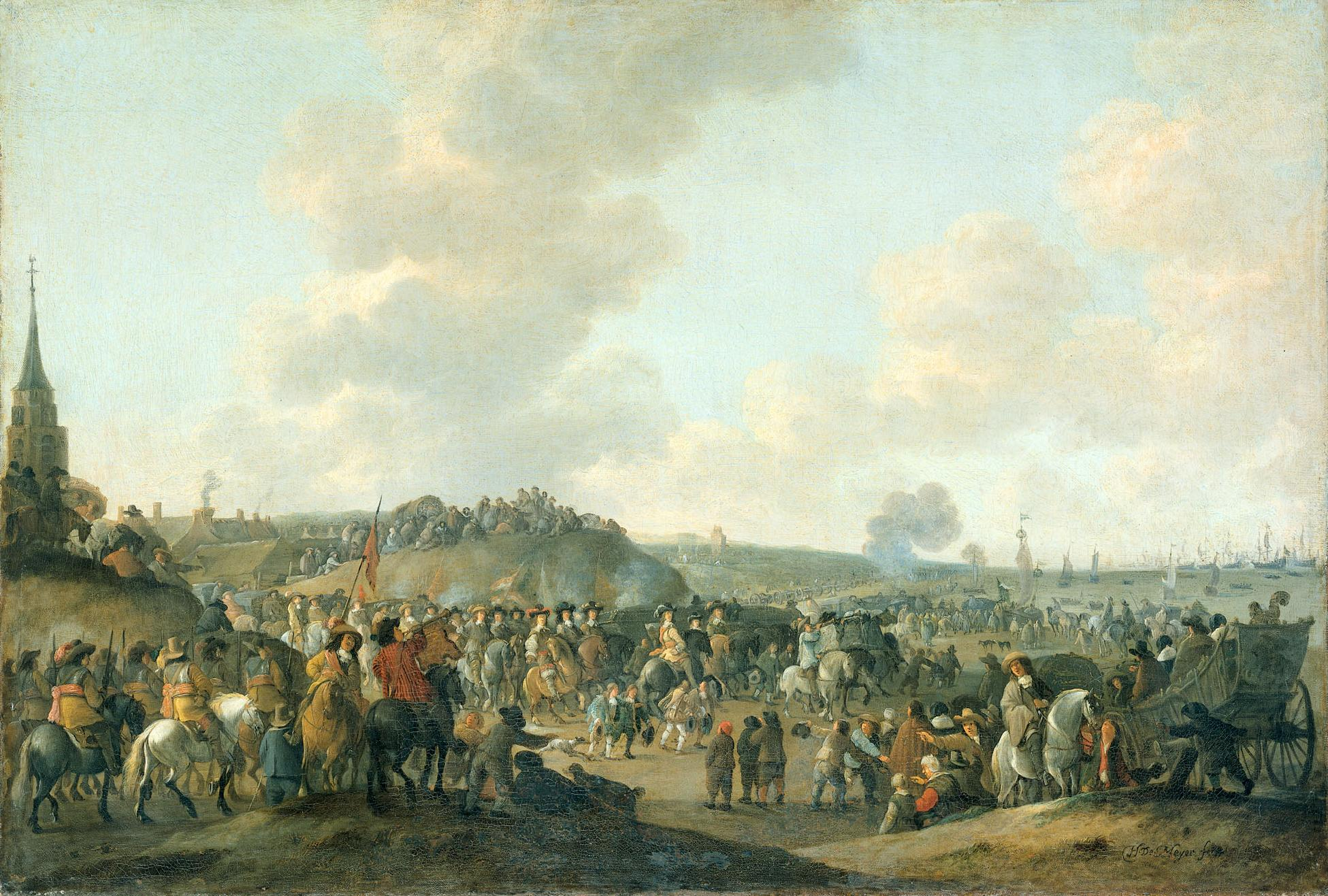
The Stuart Restoration begins.

1660 (MDCLX) was a leap year starting on Thursday of the Gregorian calendar and a leap year starting on Sunday of the Julian calendar, the 1660th year of the Common Era (CE) and Anno Domini (AD) designations, the 660th year of the 2nd millennium, the 60th year of the 17th century, and the 1st year of the 1660s decade. As of the start of 1660, the Gregorian calendar was 10 days ahead of the Julian calendar, which remained in localized use until 1923.

== Events ==
=== January–March ===
- January 1
  - At daybreak, English Army Colonel George Monck, with two brigades of troops from his Scottish occupational force, fords the River Tweed at Coldstream in Scotland to cross the Anglo-Scottish border at Northumberland, with a mission of advancing toward London to end military rule of England by General John Lambert and to accomplish the English Restoration, the return of the monarchy to England. By the end of the day, he and his soldiers have gone 15 mi (24 km) through knee-deep snow to Wooler while the advance guard of cavalry had covered 50 mi (80 km) to reach Morpeth.
  - At the same time, rebels within the New Model Army under the command of Colonel Thomas Fairfax take control of York and await the arrival of Monck's troops.
  - Samuel Pepys, a 36-year-old member of the Parliament of England, begins keeping a diary that later provides a detailed insight into daily life and events in 17th century England. He continues until May 31, 1669, when worsening eyesight leads him to quit. Pepys starts with a preliminary note, "Blessed be God, at the end of the last year I was in very good health, without any sense of my old pain but upon taking of cold. I lived in Axe-yard, having my wife and servant Jane, and no more in family than us three." For his first note on "January 1. 1659/60 Lords-day", he notes "This morning (we lying lately in the garret) I rose, put on my suit with great skirts, having not lately worn any other clothes but them," followed by recounting his attendance at the Exeter-house church in London.
- January 6 – The Rump Parliament passes a resolution requesting Colonel Monck to come to London "as speedily as he could", followed by a resolution of approval on January 12 and a vote of thanks and annual payment of 1,000 pounds sterling for his lifetime on January 16.
- January 11 – Colonel Monck and Colonel Fairfax rendezvous at York and then prepare to proceed southward toward London. gathering deserters from Lambert's army along the way.
- January 16 – With 4,000 infantry and 1,800 cavalry ("an army sufficient to overawe, without exciting suspicion"), Colonel Monck marches southward toward Nottingham, with a final destination of London. Colonel Thomas Morgan is dispatched back to Scotland with two regiments of cavalry to reinforce troops there.
- January 31 – The Rump Parliament confirms the promotion of Colonel George Monck to the rank of General and he receives the commission of rank while at St Albans.
- February 3 – General George Monck, at the head of his troops, enters London on horseback, accompanied by his principal officers and the commissioners of the Rump Parliament. Bells ring as they pass but the crowds in the streets are unenthusiastic and the troops are "astonished at meeting with so different a reception to that which they had received elsewhere during their march.".
- February 13 – Charles XI becomes king of Sweden at the age of five, upon the death of his father, Charles X Gustavus.
- February 26 – The Rump Parliament, under pressure from General Monck, votes to call back all of the surviving members of the group of 231 MPs who had been removed from the House of Commons in 1648 so that the Long Parliament can be reassembled long enough for a full Parliament to approve elections for a new legislative body.
- February 27 – John Thurloe is reinstated as England's Secretary of State, having been deprived of his offices late in the previous year.
- March 3 – General John Lambert, who had attempted to stop the Restoration, is arrested and imprisoned in the Tower of London. He escapes on April 9 but is recaptured on April 24. Though spared the death penalty for treason in 1662, he remains incarcerated on the island of Guernsey for the rest of his life until his death at age 64 on March 1, 1684.
- March 16 – The Long Parliament, after having been reassembled for the first time in more than 11 years, votes for its own dissolution and calls for new elections for what will become the Convention Parliament to make the return from republic to monarchy.
- March 31 – The war in the West Indies between the indigenous Carib people, and the French Jesuits and English people who have colonized the islands, is ended with a treaty signed at Basse-Terre at Guadeloupe at the residence of the French Governor, Charles Houël du Petit Pré.

=== April–June ===
- April 2 – The Merces baronets, a British nobility title is created.
- April 4 – The Declaration of Breda, signed by Charles Stuart, son of the late King Charles I of England, promises amnesty, freedom of conscience, and army back pay, in return for support for the English Restoration. The Declaration is read to the new parliament on May 1.
- April 25 – The Convention Parliament, a new House of Commons for England, freely elected with no requirement for candidates to swear loyalty to the Commonwealth of England, assembles in London to work out the restoration of the monarchy.
- May 1 – The Convention Parliament votes to welcome the Declaration of Breda and unanimously approves a resolution for England declaring that "according to the ancient and fundamental laws of this kingdom, the Government is, and ought to be, by Kings, Lords and Commons."
- May 3 – In the Treaty of Oliva, peace is made between the Swedish Empire, the Polish–Lithuanian Commonwealth, the Habsburgs and Brandenburg-Prussia.
- May 8 – In exile in the Netherlands, Prince Charles Stuart receives word that the Parliament of England has declared his elevation to the throne as King Charles II of England.
- May 14 – The Irish Parliament declares Charles to be King of Ireland.
- May 15 – John Thurloe is arrested for high treason, for his support of Oliver Cromwell's regime.
- May 21 – The Desormeaux caravan and 300 Iroquois die in explosion at Long Sault.
- May 23 – With the way cleared for his return to England, King Charles II ends his exile at the Hague in the Netherlands and departs from Scheveningen harbor on the English ship Naseby, renamed for the occasion HMS Royal Charles , as part of a fleet of English warships brought by Admiral Edward Montagu. On commemorative memorabilia in the Netherlands, the date of Charles's departure is listed as June 2, 1660, the date on the Gregorian calendar used in continental Europe but not in England.
- May 25 – King Charles II lands at Dover.
- May 27
  - The Treaty of Copenhagen is signed, marking the conclusion of the Second Northern War. Sweden returns Trøndelag to Norway, and Bornholm to Denmark.
  - William Morice takes office as the first Secretary of State for the Northern Department in Great Britain, with responsibility for conducting foreign relations with the Netherlands, Scandinavia, Poland, Russia, and the Holy Roman Empire. Relations with France, Spain, Portugal, Switzerland, the Italian states, and the Ottoman Empire are assigned to the Secretary of State for the Southern Department. The position will eventually evolve into the office of the Foreign Secretary.
- May 29 – King Charles II of England arrives in London and assumes the throne, marking the beginning of the English Restoration.
- June 1
  - The office of Secretary of State for the Southern Department begins operations in the Kingdom of Great Britain, with responsibility for the colonies of British America in what will later become Canada and the United States, as well as for Ireland and for the Channel Islands. Sir Edward Nicholas, a former British Secretary of State, takes office as the first Southern Department secretary.
  - Mary Dyer is hanged for defying a law banning Quakers from the Massachusetts Bay Colony.
- June 29 – John Thurloe is released from custody.

=== July–September ===
- July 13 – (Ashadh Vadya 1 of Shaka 1582) The Battle of Pavan Khind takes place in India when a 600-member contingent of the Maratha Empire army, commanded by Baji Prabhu Deshpande, works to rescue Maratha General Shivaji, who had escaped the night before from the fort of Panhala, which was under siege by the Adilshah Sultanate. The Bijapur Sultanate, commanded by Siddi Masud with a force of 10,000 men, loses 5,000 in a fight against a vastly outnumbered contingent of Adilshah.
- July 24 – The Great Fire of 1660 begins in Constantinople, capital of the Ottoman Empire (now Istanbul in Turkey), and destroys two-thirds of the city over two consecutive days, consuming 280,000 buildings and killing 40,000 people.
- July – Richard Cromwell, the last Lord Protector of England during its years as a republic, leaves the British Isles quietly and goes into exile in France, taking on an alias as "John Clarke".
- August 19 – Dr Edward Stanley preaches a sermon in the nave of Winchester Cathedral, to commemorate the return of the Chapter, following the English Restoration.
- August 29 – The Indemnity and Oblivion Act, officially "An Act of Free and General Pardon, Indemnity, and Oblivion" is given royal assent. as a general pardon for everyone who had committed crimes during the English Civil War and Interregnum (with the exception of certain crimes such as murder, piracy, buggery, rape and witchcraft, and people named in the act such as those involved in the regicide of Charles I). It also said that no action was to be taken against those involved at any later time, and that the Interregnum was to be legally forgotten.
- September 1 – Grigore I Ghica becomes the new Prince of Wallachia (now in Romania)
- September 14 – The 13-day long Battle of Lyubar begins at Liubar (now in Ukraine) during the Russo-Polish War between soldiers of the Polish–Lithuanian Commonwealth against Russia and ends with a victory by Poland.
- September 16 – Juan Francisco Leiva y de la Cerda arrives in Mexico City as the new Viceroy of New Spain.
- September 25 – Samuel Pepys has his first cup of tea (an event recorded in his diary).

=== October–December ===
- October 13 – The Rigsraad (High Council) of Denmark is abolished and Denmark-Norway becomes an absolute monarchy as King Frederik III is recognized by the nobility as being entitled to have his throne passed to his descendants by hereditary monarchy.
- October 13 to October 19 – Ten of the 57 "regicides" who signed the death warrant of Charles I of England in 1649 are executed over a period of one week, mostly at Charing Cross by being hanged, drawn and quartered, a process which includes being disemboweled (in some cases before they have died) and then and burned. The first to die is Thomas Harrison, a leader of the Fifth Monarchists. He is followed by John Carew (October 15); John Cook and Hugh Peter (October 16); (Adrian Scrope, John Moore, Gregory Clement and Thomas Scot) (October 17); and Daniel Axtell and Francis Hacker (October 19).
- November 28 – At Gresham College in London, twelve men, including Christopher Wren, Robert Boyle, John Wilkins, and Sir Robert Moray meet after a lecture by Wren, and decide to found "a College for the Promoting of Physico-Mathematicall Experimentall Learning" (later known as the Royal Society).
- December 8 – The first English actress appears on the professional stage in England in a non-singing role, as Desdemona in Othello at Vere Street Theatre in London, following the reopening of the theatres (various opinions have been advanced that the actress was Margaret Hughes, Anne Marshall or Katherine Corey). Historian Elizabeth Howe notes, however, that both William Davenant and Thomas Killigrew had women in their acting companies before 1660, and that Anne Marshall might be just one of the first rather than the actual first.
- December 15 – Andres Malong, a native chieftain of the town of Binalatongan (now San Carlos) in the Philippines, leads a successful revolt against the Spanish colonial administrators to liberate Pangasinan. He is proclaimed the King of Pangasinan, but the rebellion is suppressed on January 17, 1661, and Pangasinan is reconquered by February.
- December 18 – The Company of the Royal Adventurers into Africa, planned by Prince James, brother of King Charles II to capture persons along the coast of West Africa for resale as slaves, receives its charter. Prince James, later King James II, had started asking for investors (at 250 pounds sterling per share) starting on October 3, 1660.
- December 29 – The Convention Parliament is dissolved by King Charles II and elections are called for what will be called the Cavalier Parliament.

=== Date unknown ===
- Blaise Pascal's Lettres provinciales, a defense of the Jansenist Antoine Arnauld, is ordered to be shredded and burned by King Louis XIV of France.
- The Expulsion of the Carib indigenous people from Martinique is carried out by French occupying forces.
- Hopkins School is founded in New Haven, Connecticut.
- A permanent standing army is established in Prussia.

== Births ==
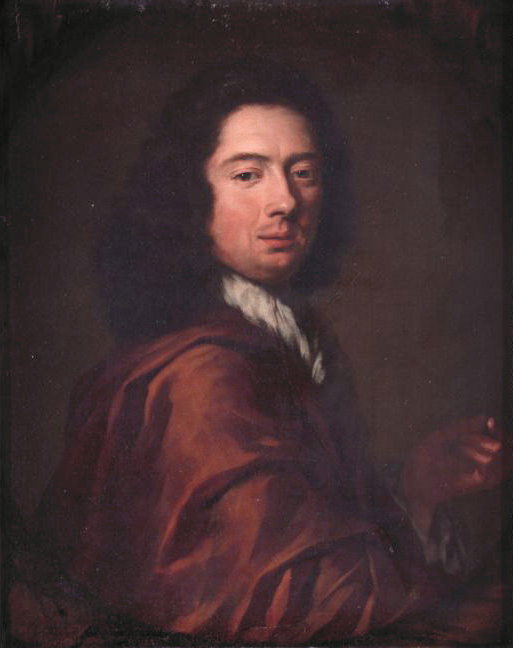
Arnold Houbraken

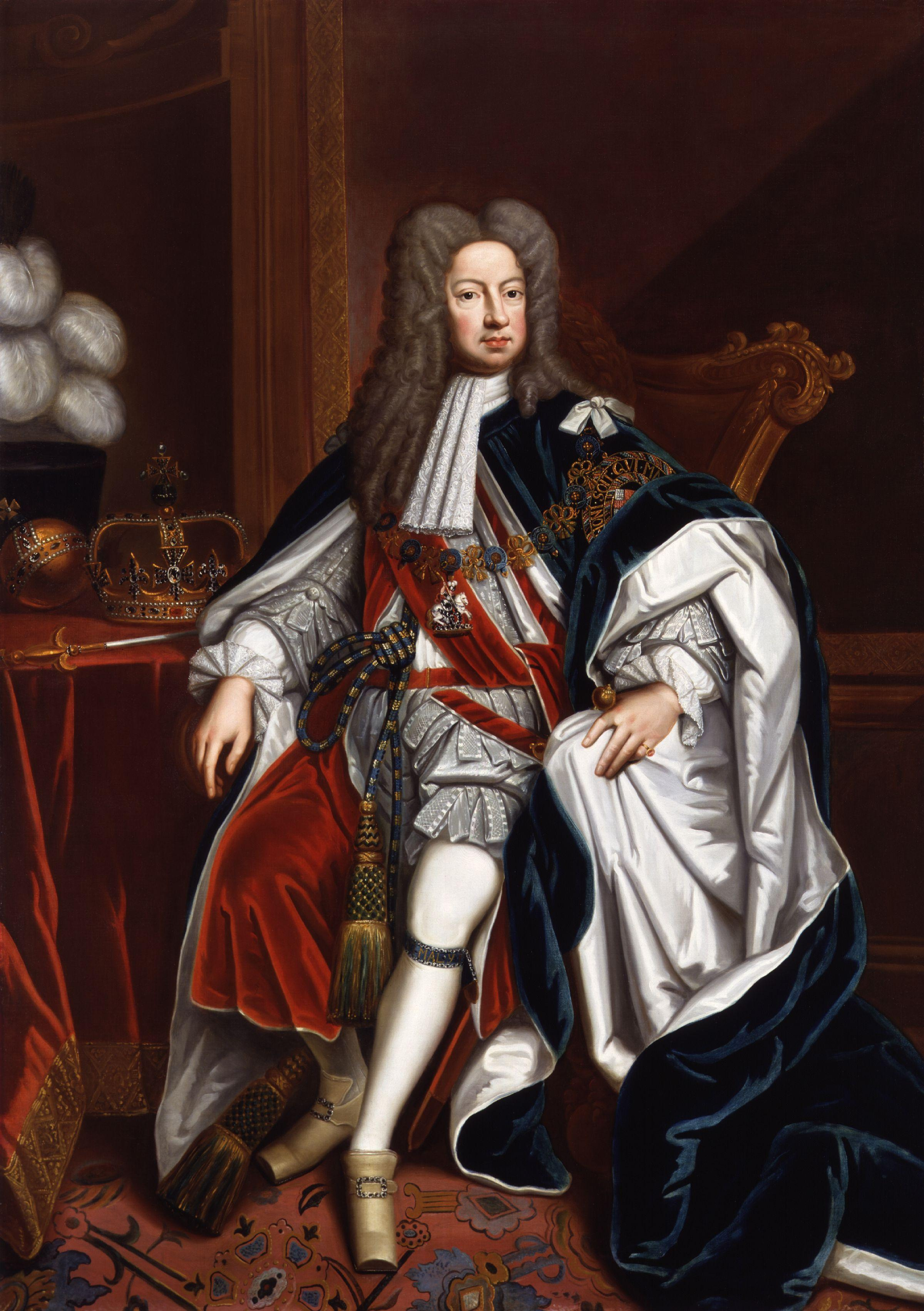
George I of Great Britain

- January 2 – Francis Hutchinson, Irish bishop (d. 1739)
- January 14 – Joseph Boyse, Presbyterian minister (d. 1728)
- January 27 – Felice Cignani, Italian painter (d. 1724)
- January – Hippolyte Hélyot, French historian (d. 1716)
- February 13 – Johann Sigismund Kusser, German composer (d. 1727)
- February 19 – Friedrich Hoffmann, German physician and chemist (d. 1742)
- February 20 – Leonhard Dientzenhofer, German architect (d. 1707)
- February 24 – John Murray, 1st Duke of Atholl (d. 1724)
- March 5 – George Stanhope, Dean of Canterbury (d. 1728)
- March 9 – Franz Joseph Feuchtmayer, German sculptor (d. 1718)
- March 12 – Zofia Czarnkowska Opalińska, mother-in-law of King Stanislaus I of Poland (d. 1701)
- March 15 – Olof Rudbeck the Younger, Swedish scientist and explorer (d. 1740)
- March 24 – Filippo Antonio Gualterio, Italian Catholic cardinal (d. 1728)
- March 25 – Samuel Crellius, Arian philosopher and theologian (d. 1747)
- March 28 – Arnold Houbraken, Dutch painter (d. 1719)
- April 6 – Johann Kuhnau, German composer, organist and harpsichordist (d. 1722)
- April 16 – Hans Sloane, British physician (d. 1753)
- April 19 – Sebastián Durón, Spanish composer (d. 1716)
- April 24 – Cornelis Dusart, Dutch painter (d. 1704)
- By May – Anne Killigrew, English poet and painter (d. 1685)
- May 2 – Alessandro Scarlatti, Italian composer (d. 1725)
- May 5 – David Leslie, 3rd Earl of Leven, British politician (d. 1728)
- May 20 – Andreas Schlüter, German sculptor (d. 1714)
- June 3 – Johannes Schenck, Dutch musician and composer (d. 1712)
- June 5 – Sarah Churchill, Duchess of Marlborough, British aristocrat (d. 1744)
- June 7 – King George I of Great Britain (d. 1727)
- June 17 – Jan van Mieris, Dutch painter (d. 1690)
- July 24 – Charles Talbot, 1st Duke of Shrewsbury, English politician (d. 1718)
- July 27 – Johann Patkul, Livonian nobleman, politician (d. 1707)
- August 2 – Luis Francisco de la Cerda, Spanish noble, politician (d. 1711)
- August 11 – Henrietta Wentworth, 6th Baroness Wentworth of England (d. 1686)
- August 17 – Sir Richard Bulkeley, 2nd Baronet of England (d. 1710)
- August 21 – Hubert Gautier, French engineer (d. 1737)
- August 27
  - Robert Wroth, British politician (d. 1720)
  - Claude-François Fraguier, French churchman, writer (d. 1728)
- September 2 – Louis Chéron, French painter (d. 1725)
- September 25 – Willem Verschuring, Dutch painter (d. 1726)
- September 26 – George William, Duke of Liegnitz (d. 1675)
- September – Daniel Defoe, English writer (d. 1731)
- October 20 – Robert Bertie, 1st Duke of Ancaster and Kesteven, English statesman (d.1723)
- October 21 – Georg Ernst Stahl, German physician and chemist (d. 1734)
- October 22 – Charles Stuart, Duke of Cambridge (d. 1661)
- October 30
  - Albrecht Konrad Finck von Finckenstein, German general (d. 1735)
  - Ernest August, Duke of Schleswig-Holstein-Sonderburg-Augustenburg (d. 1731)
- November 4
  - Albert Angell, Norwegian civil servant (d. 1705)
  - Samuel Russell, Minister of Branford, Yale co-founder (d. 1731)
- November 7 – Ferdinand Johann Adam von Pernau, Austrian ornithologist (d. 1731)
- November 11 – Francesco Maria de' Medici, Duke of Rovere and Montefeltro, Italian Catholic cardinal (d. 1711)
- November 15 – Hermann von der Hardt, German historian (d. 1746)
- November 20 – Daniel Ernst Jablonski, Czech bishop (d. 1741)
- November 22 – Franz Karl of Auersperg, Prince of Auersperg, Duke of Münsterberg (1705–1713) (d. 1713)
- November 28 – Maria Anna Victoria of Bavaria, Dauphine of France (d. 1690)
- November 30 – Victor-Marie d'Estrées, Marshal of France (d. 1737)
- December – Massimo Santoro Tubito, Italian priest and writer (d. unknown)
- December 4 – André Campra, French composer (d. 1744)
- December 18 – Countess Johanna Magdalene of Hanau-Lichtenberg, German countess (d. 1715)
- December 25 – Charles Somerset, Marquess of Worcester, English politician (d. 1698)
- December 26 – Peter Schenk the Elder, German engraver and cartographer (d. 1711)
- December 27 – Veronica Giuliani, Italian Capuchin mystic (d. 1727)
- date unknown
  - Chen Shu, Chinese painter (d. 1736)
  - Johann Joseph Fux, Austrian composer (d. 1741)
  - Jeanne Dumée, French astronomer (d. 1706)
  - Thomas Southerne, Irish playwright (d. 1746)

== Deaths ==
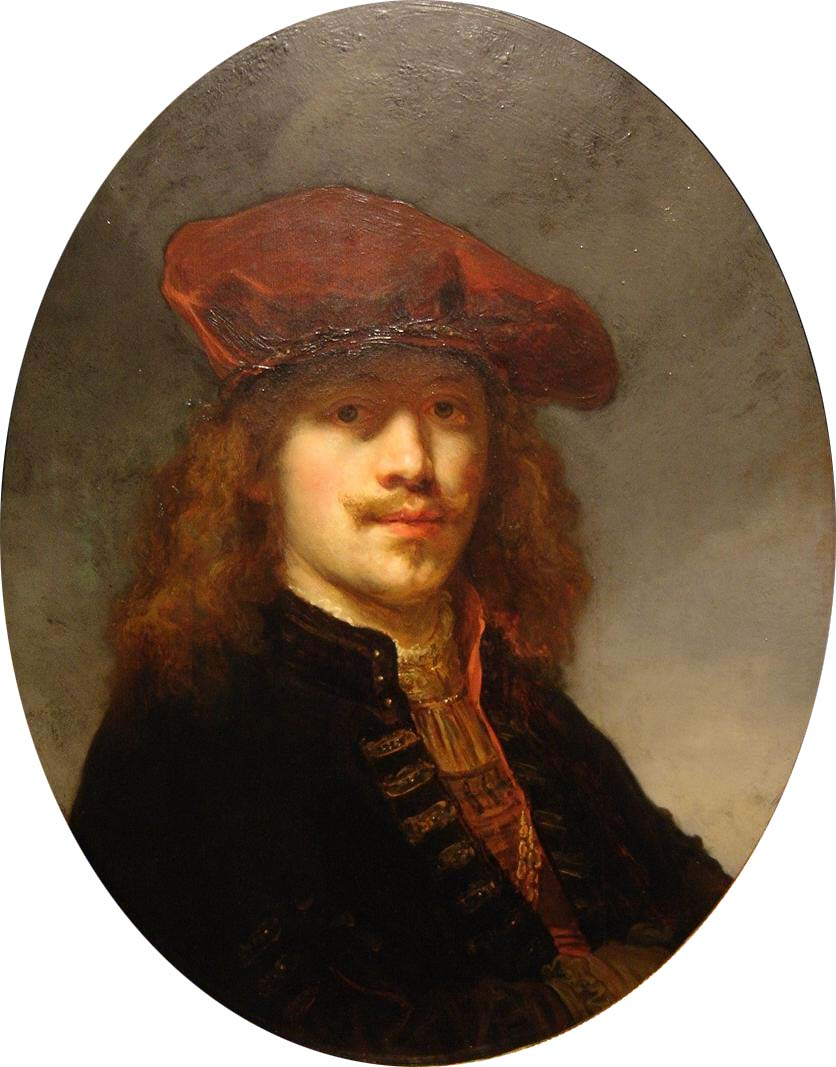
Govert Flinck

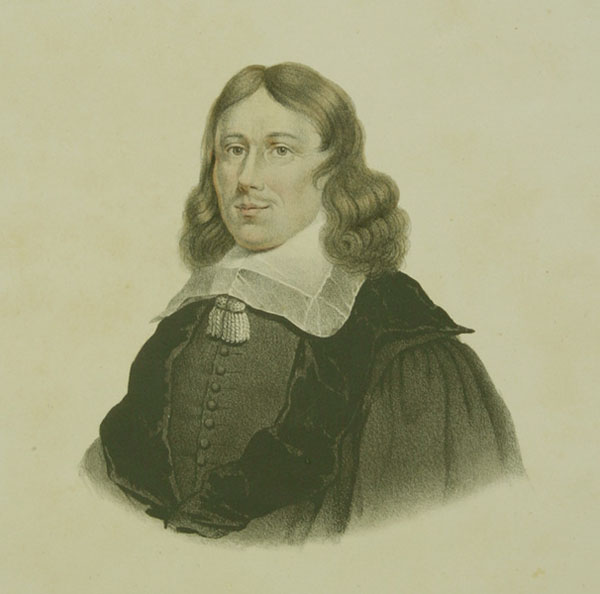
Frans van Schooten

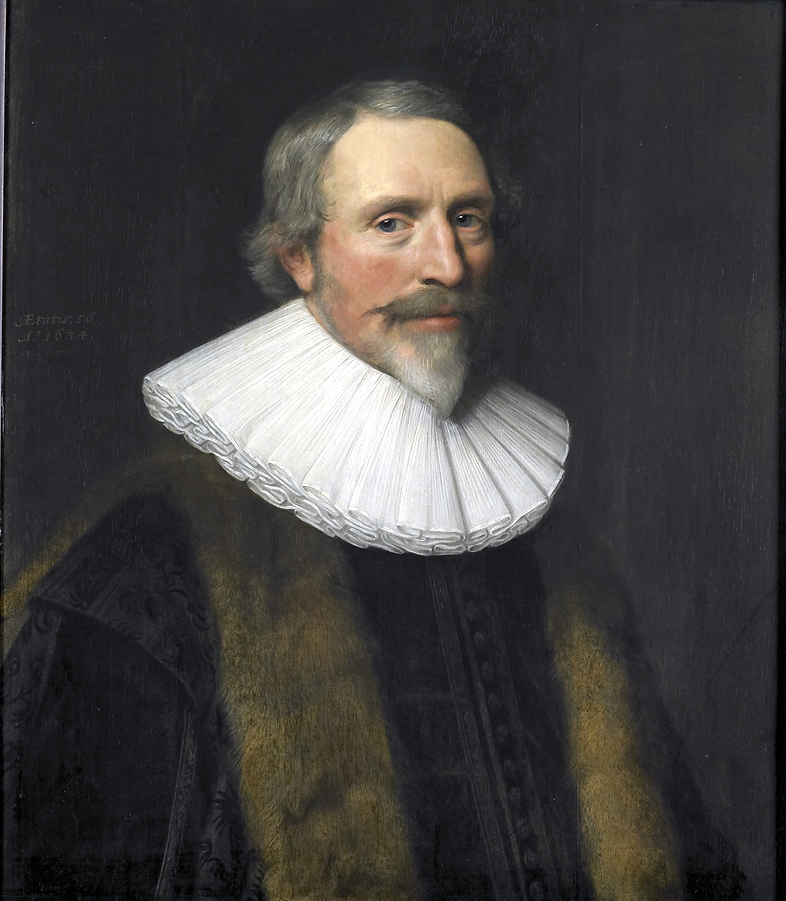
Jacob Cats

- January 16 – Peter Wtewael, Dutch painter (b. 1596)
- February 2
  - Govert Flinck, Dutch painter (b. 1615)
  - Gaston, Duke of Orléans, French politician (b. 1608)
- February 6 – Martin de Redin, Spanish 58th Grandmaster of the Knights Hospitaller (b. 1579)
- February 10 – Judith Leyster, Dutch painter (b. 1609)
- February 13 – King Charles X Gustav of Sweden (b. 1622)
- March – Philip Skippon, English soldier (b. c. 1600)
- March 5 – Felice Ficherelli, Italian painter (b. 1605)
- March 15 – Louise de Marillac, French co-founder of the Daughters of Charity (b. 1591)
- April 4 – Enno Louis, Prince of East Frisia, Frisian prince (b. 1632)
- April 6
  - Giovanni Battista Hodierna, Italian astronomer (b. 1597)
  - Michelangelo Cerquozzi, Italian painter (b. 1602)
- April 25 – Henry Hammond, English churchman (b. 1605)
- April 26 – Elizabeth Charlotte of the Palatinate, wife of George William (b. 1597)
- April 30 – Petrus Scriverius, Dutch writer (b. 1576)
- May 21 – Adam Dollard des Ormeaux, iconic figure in the history of New France (b. 1635)
- May 29
  - Frans van Schooten, Dutch mathematician (b. 1615)
  - George FitzGerald, 16th Earl of Kildare, Irish earl (b. 1612)
- June 1 – Mary Dyer, English Quaker (hanged) (b. c. 1611)
- June 2 – Annet de Clermont-Gessant, French 59th Grandmaster of the Knights Hospitaller (b. 1587)
- June 5 –Anne Holck, Danish noble and war heroine (b. 1602)
- June 7 – George II Rákóczi, Transylvanian ruler (b. 1621)
- June 8 – Lorentz Eichstadt, German mathematician and astronomer (b. 1596)
- June 13 – Lady Katherine Ferrers, English aristocrat and heiress (b. 1634)
- June 30 – William Oughtred, English mathematician (b. 1575)
- July 7 – Anna of Pomerania, Duchess-Consort of Croy and Havré (b. 1590)
- August 2 – Agostino Mitelli, Italian painter (b. 1609)
- August 6 – Diego Velázquez, Spanish painter (b. 1599)
- August 10 – Esmé Stewart, 2nd Duke of Richmond (b. 1649)
- August 14
  - Maria Gonzaga, Duchess of Montferrat, Italian noble (b. 1609)
  - William Lytton, Member of Parliament (b. 1586)
- August 31 – Johann Freinsheim, German classical scholar, critic (b. 1608)
- September 12 – Jacob Cats, Dutch poet, jurist and politician (b. 1577)
- September 13 – Henry Stuart, Duke of Gloucester, son of Charles I (b. 1640)
- September 15 – John Casimir, Prince of Anhalt-Dessau (b. 1596)
- September 27 – Vincent de Paul, French saint (b. 1580)
- October 4 – Francesco Albani, Italian painter (b. 1578)
- October 6 – Paul Scarron, French writer (b. 1610)
- October 14 – Thomas Harrison, English soldier (b. 1616)
- October 17 – Adrian Scrope, English regicide (b. 1601)
- November 5
  - Lucy Hay, Countess of Carlisle, English socialite (b. 1599)
  - Alexandre de Rhodes, French Jesuit missionary (b. 1591)
- November 27 – John Finch, 1st Baron Finch, English judge (b. 1584)
- November 30 – Prince Francis Charles of Saxe-Lauenburg (b. 1591)
- December 1 – Pierre d'Hozier, French historian (b. 1592)
- December 22 – André Tacquet, Belgian mathematician (b. 1612)
- December 24 – Mary, Princess Royal and Princess of Orange (b. 1631)
- December 27 – Hervey Bagot, English politician (b. 1591)
- approximate – William Stone, Colonial governor of Maryland (b. c. 1603)
