= 1602 =

1602 in various calendars
- Gregorian calendar: 1602; MDCII
- Ab urbe condita: 2355
- Armenian calendar: 1051; ԹՎ ՌԾԱ
- Assyrian calendar: 6352
- Balinese saka calendar: 1523–1524
- Bengali calendar: 1008–1009
- Berber calendar: 2552
- English Regnal year: 44 Eliz. 1 – 45 Eliz. 1
- Buddhist calendar: 2146
- Burmese calendar: 964
- Byzantine calendar: 7110–7111
- Chinese calendar: 辛丑年 (Metal Ox); 4299 or 4092 — to — 壬寅年 (Water Tiger); 4300 or 4093
- Coptic calendar: 1318–1319
- Discordian calendar: 2768
- Ethiopian calendar: 1594–1595
- Hebrew calendar: 5362–5363
- Hindu calendars
- Vikram Samvat: 1658–1659
- Shaka Samvat: 1523–1524
- Kali Yuga: 4702–4703
- Holocene calendar: 11602
- Igbo calendar: 602–603
- Iranian calendar: 980–981
- Islamic calendar: 1010–1011
- Japanese calendar: Keichō 7 (慶長７年)
- Javanese calendar: 1522–1523
- Julian calendar: Gregorian minus 10 days
- Korean calendar: 3935
- Minguo calendar: 310 before ROC 民前310年
- Nanakshahi calendar: 134
- Thai solar calendar: 2144–2145
- Tibetan calendar: ལྕགས་མོ་གླང་ལོ་ (female Iron-Ox); 1728 or 1347 or 575 — to — ཆུ་ཕོ་སྟག་ལོ་ (male Water-Tiger); 1729 or 1348 or 576

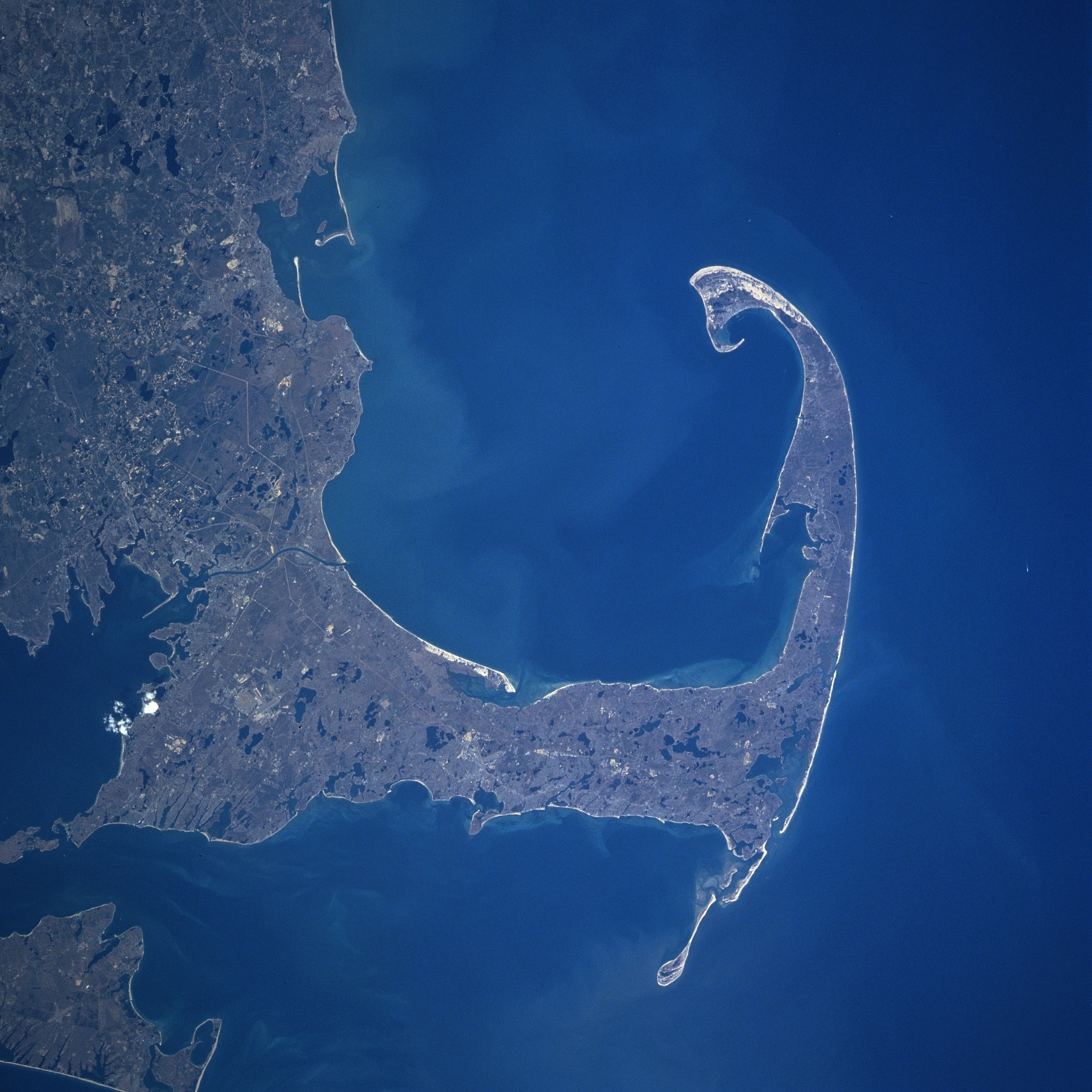
May 15: Bartholomew Gosnold discovers Cape Cod

1602 (MDCII) was a common year starting on Tuesday of the Gregorian calendar and a common year starting on Friday of the Julian calendar, the 1602nd year of the Common Era (CE) and Anno Domini (AD) designations, the 602nd year of the 2nd millennium, the 2nd year of the 17th century, and the 3rd year of the 1600s decade. As of the start of 1602, the Gregorian calendar was 10 days ahead of the Julian calendar, which remained in localized use until 1923.

== Events ==
=== January–March ===
- January 3 – Battle of Kinsale: The English defeat Irish rebels and their Spanish allies. (The battle happens on this date according to the Gregorian calendar used by the Irish and Spanish but on Thursday, 24 December, 1601 according to the old Julian calendar used by the English.)
- February 2 (Candlemas night) – In London, the first known production of William Shakespeare's comedy Twelfth Night takes place.
- March 20 – The United East India Company is established by the United Provinces States-General in Amsterdam, with the stated intention of capturing the spice trade from the Portuguese.

=== April–June ===
- April 20 – The Danish–Icelandic Trade Monopoly is established.
- May 25 (May 15 Old Style) – English explorer Bartholomew Gosnold, sailing in the Concord, becomes the first European at Cape Cod.
- June 2 – Dutch explorer Joris van Spilbergen lands on the eastern side of the island of Sri Lanka, at Santhamuruthu, and begins the process of attempting to establish a relationship with the rulers of the Kingdom of Kandy.
- June 3 – Anglo-Spanish War (1585) – Battle of Sesimbra Bay off of the coast of Portugal: Five galleons of the English Royal Navy defeat a larger force of Spanish Navy ships.
- June 5 – James Lancaster's East India Company fleet arrives at Achin (modern-day Aceh), Sumatra to deal with the local ruler. Having defeated Portugal's ally, the ruler is happy to do business, and Lancaster seizes a large Portuguese galleon and loots it.
- June 17 – An expedition of 14 Dutch Republic ships, commanded by Admiral Wybrand van Warwijck, departs from Texel on its expedition to the East Indies.
- June 18 – Nine Years' War (Ireland): Dunboy Castle in Ireland is taken by the English after 143 Irish defenders had withstood an 11-day siege by more than 4,000 English soldiers under the command of Sir George Carew. Of the 143 soldiers, who had been loyal to Donal Cam O'Sullivan Beare, 85 are killed in the siege, and the 58 survivors are hanged after the English victory.

=== July–September ===
- July 7 – The German duchy of Saxe-Altenburg, with a capital at Altenburg, is created as a separate duchy as a gift to Johann Philipp, the eldest son of his father Johann II, Duke of Saxe-Weimar.
- July 26 – William Shakespeare's tragedy Hamlet, recently premiered by the Lord Chamberlain's Men, is licensed for publishing in London but not in fact printed at this time.
- July 29 – Juan de Zúñiga Flores, Bishop of Cartagena, becomes the Grand Inquisitor of Spain but serves for only five months before his death at the age of 55.
- August 22 – Abu'l-Fazl ibn Mubarak, the prime minister for India's Mughal Emperor Akbar, is assassinated at Narwar as part of a plot by Emperor Akbar's son, Prince Salim, who will later succeed Akbar as Emperor Jahangir. Abu'l-Fazl's killer, Vir Singh Bundela, sends the victim's severed head to Prince Salim as proof of the plot's success.
- September 1 – The Mutiny of Hoogstraten, a rebellion by soldiers of the Army of Flanders, begins with the seizure by 3,000 disgruntled mercenaries of the town of Hoogstraten (now in Belgium). The mutineers hold the town for almost two years before surrendering on 18 May 1604.
- September 10 – Rory O'Donnell (Rudhraighe Ó Domhnaill) becomes the last Irish King of Tyrconnell upon the death of his brother, Hugh Roe O'Donnell (Aodh Ruadh Ó Domhnaill). After less than a year, Rory allows Tyrconnell (modern-day County Donegal in Northern Ireland) to come under Irish control in return for being created the Earl of Tyrconnell.
- September 12 – King Sigismund III Vasa of Poland receives the delivery of eight specially woven Persian carpets displaying Poland's royal coat of arms, after having dispatched agent Sefer Muratowicz to Kashan.
- September 20 – The siege of the Spanish Netherlands town of De Graaf ends after two months as a Dutch and English army forces the surrender of the Spanish defenders.
- September 30 – The siege of Weissenstein, a Swedish town that is now Paide in Estonia, ends after four months with a victory of 2,000 Polish and Lithuanian troops commanded by Jan Zamoyski, the Great Crown Hetman of the Polish–Lithuanian Commonwealth.

=== October–December ===
- October 3 – Battle of the Narrow Seas: An English fleet, joined by the Dutch, begins a pursuit of six Spanish galleys through the Strait of Dover, and defeats them the next day.
- November 8 – The Bodleian Library at the University of Oxford in England is opened.
- December 11 – A surprise attack by forces under the command of Charles Emmanuel I, Duke of Savoy, and his brother-in-law, Philip III of Spain, is repelled by the citizens of Geneva (this actually takes place after midnight, in the early morning of December 12, but commemorations/celebrations on Fête de l'Escalade are usually held on December 11 or the closest weekend).

=== Ongoing ===
- Russian famine of 1601–03
- Long Turkish War (1591/1593-1606)
- Jelali revolts

=== Date unknown ===
- The Portuguese are expelled from Bahrain.
- The Safavid Empire of Persia and the Spanish Empire conclude a defensive alliance and declare war on the Ottoman Empire.
- First publication, in London, of:
  - Ben Jonson's satirical comedy Poetaster.
  - William Shakespeare's comedy The Merry Wives of Windsor.
  - The play A Larum for London, or the Siedge of Antwerp.
- Copies are printed of the geographical map of East Asia created by Matteo Ricci, an Italian Jesuit stationed in Ming dynasty Beijing, China, with Chinese-written labeling and map symbols.
- The iconoclast and Confucian scholar Li Zhi commits suicide while in a Chinese prison, during the late Ming dynasty; he had taught that women were the intellectual equals of men and should be given equal opportunity in education; he was charged with spreading "dangerous ideas".

== Births ==
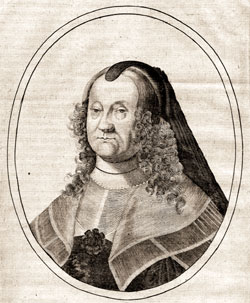
Countess Amalie Elisabeth of Hanau-Münzenberg born 29 January

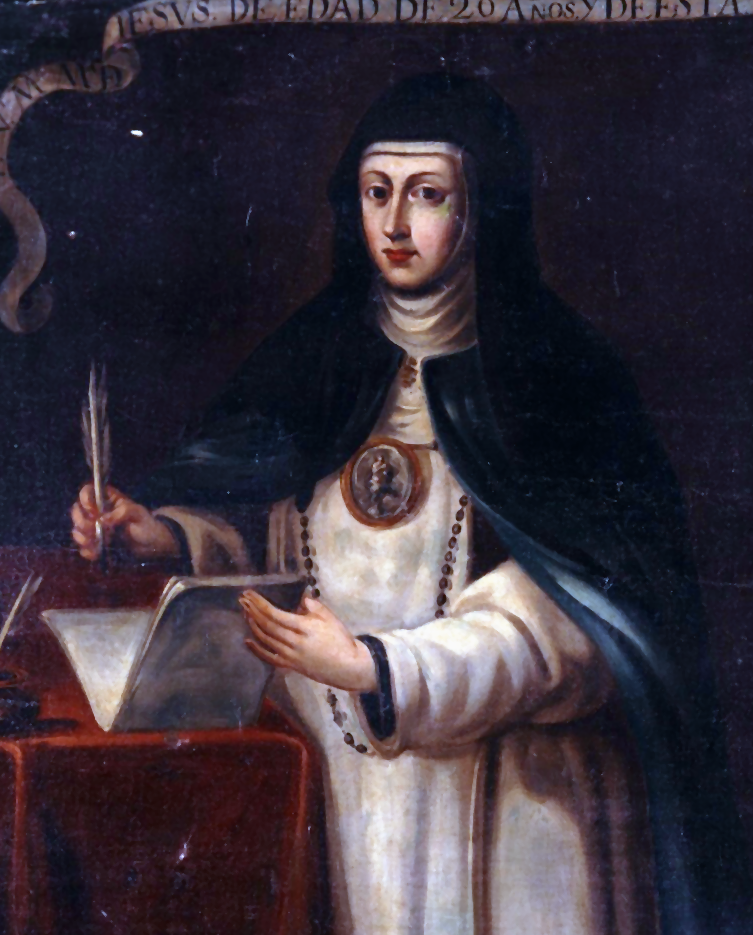
Mary of Jesus of Ágreda born 2 April

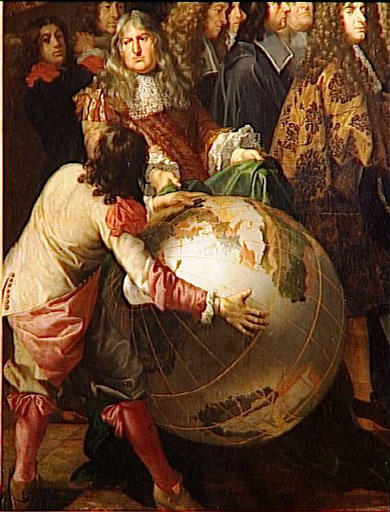
Gilles de Roberval born 10 August

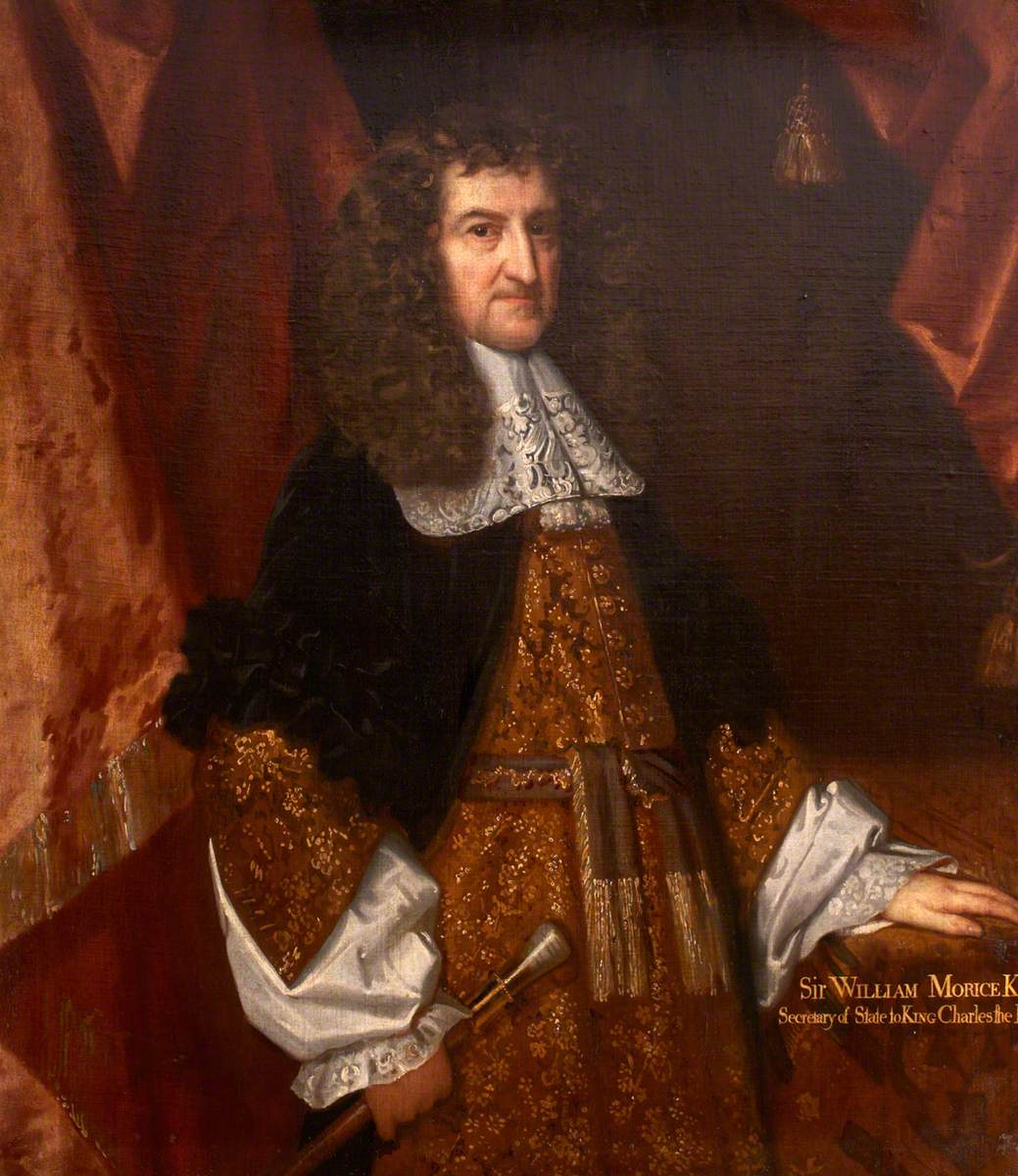
William Morice (Secretary of State) born 6 November

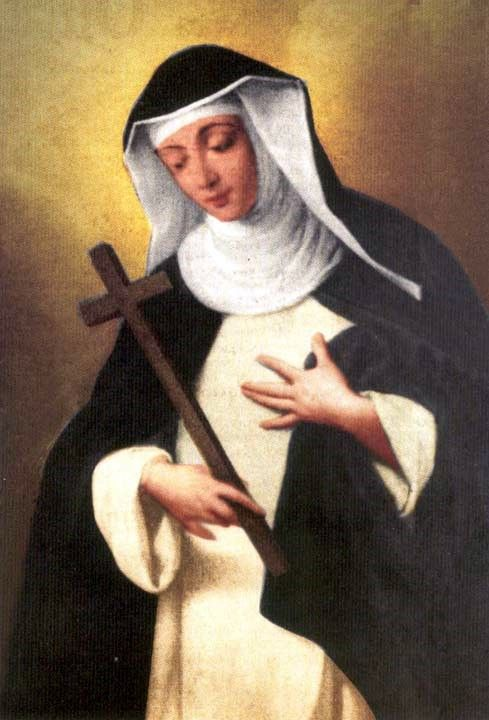
Agnes of Jesus born 17 November

=== January–March ===
- January 2
  - Rodrigo Ponce de León, 4th Duke of Arcos, Spanish noble (d. 1658)
  - Sir Thomas Twisden, 1st Baronet, English politician (d. 1683)
- January 14 – Sir Henry Slingsby, 1st Baronet, English baronet (d. 1658)
- January 18 – Robert Stuart, Duke of Kintyre and Lorne, fifth child of James VI of Scots and Anne of Denmark (d. 1602)
- January 19 – Anna Maria Antigó, Spanish Catholic nun (d. 1676)
- January 24 – Mildmay Fane, 2nd Earl of Westmorland, English politician (d. 1666)
- January 29 – Countess Amalie Elisabeth of Hanau-Münzenberg, Regent of Hesse-Kassel (1637–1650) (d. 1651)
- January 31 – Adam Billaut, French poet, carpenter (d. 1662)
- February 2 – Jeanne des Anges, French Ursuline nun in Loudun (d. 1665)
- February 12 – Michelangelo Cerquozzi, Italian painter (d. 1660)
- February 13 – William V, Landgrave of Hesse-Kassel (d. 1637)
- February 14 – Francesco Cavalli, Italian composer of the early Baroque period (d. 1676)
- February 16 – Eleonore Dorothea of Anhalt-Dessau, Duchess of Saxe-Weimar by marriage (d. 1664)
- February 18
  - Pieter Meulener, Flemish Baroque painter (d. 1654)
  - Per Brahe the Younger, Swedish soldier and statesman (d. 1680)
- March 12 – Juan Velez, Spanish Catholic prelate who was appointed Bishop of Cebu (d. 1661)
- March 18 – Jacques de Billy, French Jesuit mathematician (d. 1679)
- March 24 – Edward Leigh, English writer (d. 1671)
- March 27 – Sir Christopher Yelverton, 1st Baronet, English politician (d. 1654)
- March 29
  - John Arrowsmith, English theologian and academic (d. 1659)
  - John Lightfoot, English churchman and rabbinical scholar (d. 1675)

=== April–June ===
- April – William Lawes, English composer and musician (d. 1645)
- April 2 – Mary of Jesus of Ágreda, Franciscan abbess and spiritual writer (d. 1665)
- April 12 – Daniel Knudsen Bildt, Dano-Norwegian military officer and large estate owner in Norway (d. 1651)
- April 28 – Tokugawa Yorinobu, Japanese nobleman (d. 1671)
- April 30 – Robert Baillie, Scottish divine and historical writer (d. 1662)
- May 1 – William Lilly, English astrologer (d. 1681)
- May 2 – Athanasius Kircher, German scholar (d. 1680)
- May 10 – Samuel Newman, colonial Massachusetts clergyman (d. 1663)
- May 12 – Dorothea Augusta of Schleswig-Holstein-Gottorp, German duchess (d. 1682)
- May 26 – Philippe de Champaigne, French painter (d. 1674)
- June 2 – Rudolf Christian, Count of East Frisia, ruler of East Frisia in the early years of the Thirty Years' War (d. 1628)

=== July–September ===
- July 8 – François Perrochel, French cleric (d. 1682)
- July 9 – Maeda Gen'i, Japanese Buddhist priest
- July 14 – Cardinal Mazarin, French statesman (d. 1661)
- July 15 – John Bradshaw, English judge and regicide (d. 1659)
- July 18 – Samuel Stone, Connecticut Puritan minister (d. 1663)
- July 26 – Ana de los Angeles Monteagudo, Peruvian nun (d. 1686)
- August 10 – Gilles de Roberval, French mathematician (d. 1675)
- August 23 – Sir John Marsham, 1st Baronet, English politician (d. 1685)
- August 31 – Amalia of Solms-Braunfels, Princess consort to Frederick Henry (d. 1675)
- September 1 – Peregrine Hoby, English politician (d. 1679)
- September 17 – Sir Richard Newdigate, 1st Baronet, English politician (d. 1678)
- September 29 – Algernon Percy, 10th Earl of Northumberland, English military leader (d. 1668)

=== October–December ===
- October 3 – Arnold Braemes, English politician (d. 1681)
- October 9 – Robert Caesar, English politician (d. 1637)
- October 12 – William Chillingworth, controversial English churchman (d. 1644)
- November 6 – William Morice, English politician (d. 1676)
- November 17 – Agnes of Jesus, French Catholic nun (d. 1634)
- November 20 – Otto von Guericke, German inventor and Mayor of Magdeburg (d. 1686)
- November 22 – Elisabeth of France, queen of Philip IV of Spain (d. 1644)
- November 23 – Louis Philip, Count Palatine of Simmern-Kaiserslautern, Prince of Paltinate (d. 1655)
- November 27 – Chiara Margarita Cozzolani, Italian abbess and composer (d. 1670)
- December 4 – Johann Hülsemann, German theologian (d. 1661)
- December 7
  - Anne Holck, Danish noble and war heroine (d. 1660)
  - Bartholomew Mastrius, Italian theologian (d. 1673)
- December 18 – Simonds d'Ewes, English antiquarian and politician (d. 1650)
- December 26 – Sir Norton Knatchbull, 1st Baronet, English politician (d. 1685)

=== Date unknown ===
- John Berkeley, 1st Baron Berkeley of Stratton (d. 1678)
- Caesar, duc de Choiseul, French marshal and diplomat (d. 1675)
- John Greaves, English mathematician and antiquary (d. 1652)
- Jean-Baptiste Budes, Comte de Guébriant, marshal of France (d. 1643)
- Edward Montagu, 2nd Earl of Manchester, English soldier (d. 1671)
- Henry Marten, English lawyer, politician and regicide (d. 1680)
- Theodorus Moretus, Flemish mathematician (d. 1667)
- Nectarius of Jerusalem, Orthodox Patriarch of Jerusalem (d. 1676)
- Dudley North, 4th Baron North, English politician (d. 1677)
- Katarzyna Ostrogska, Polish noblewoman (d. 1642)
- Antoine de l'Age, duc de Puylaurens, French courtier (d. 1635)
- Eleonora Ramirez di Montalvo, Italian educator (d. 1659)

=== Probable ===
- Owen Feltham, English religious writer (d. 1668)
- Richard Óge Martyn, Irish politician (d. 1648)
- Salomon van Ruysdael, Dutch landscape painter (d. 1670)

== Deaths ==
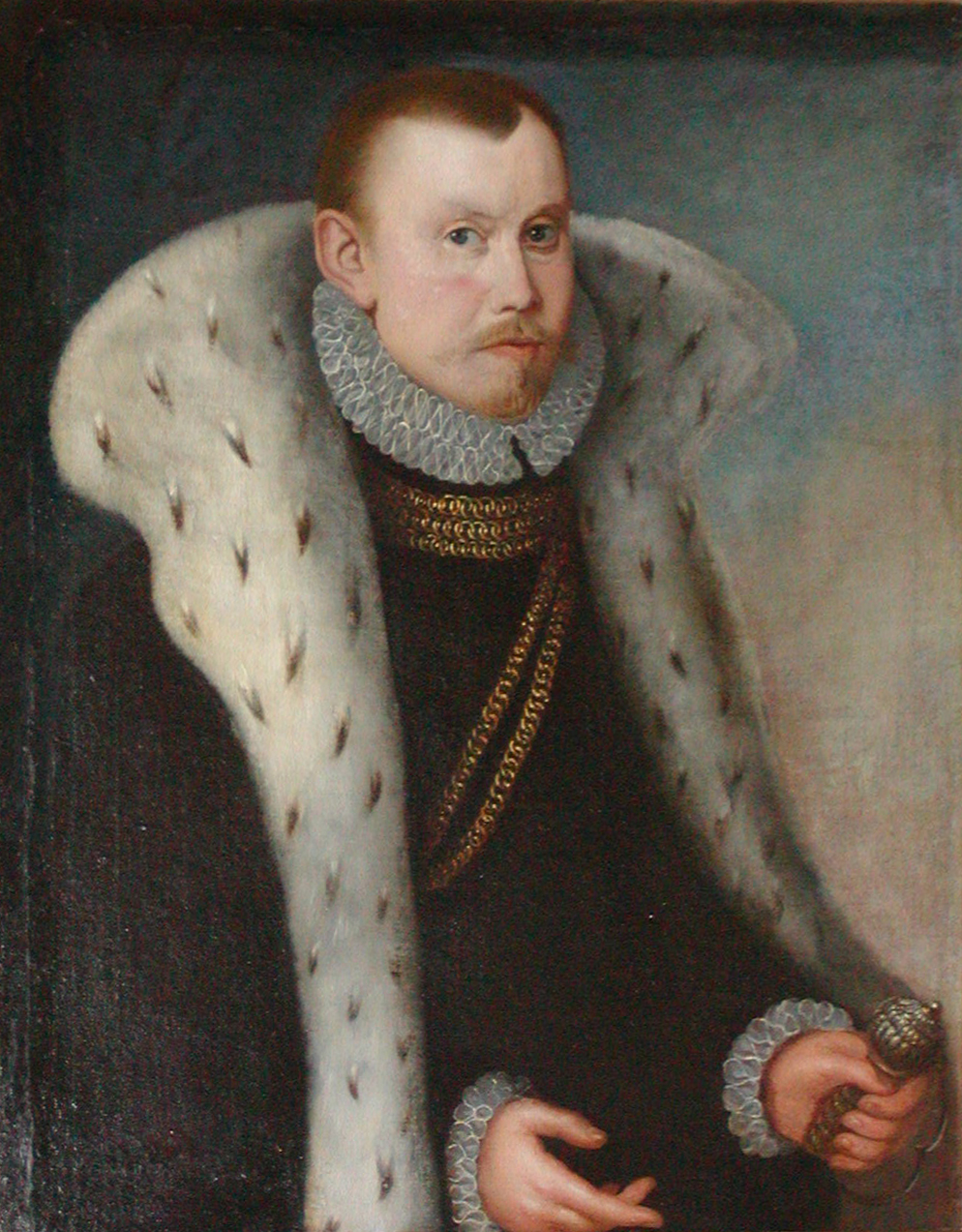
Ludvig Munk died 8 April

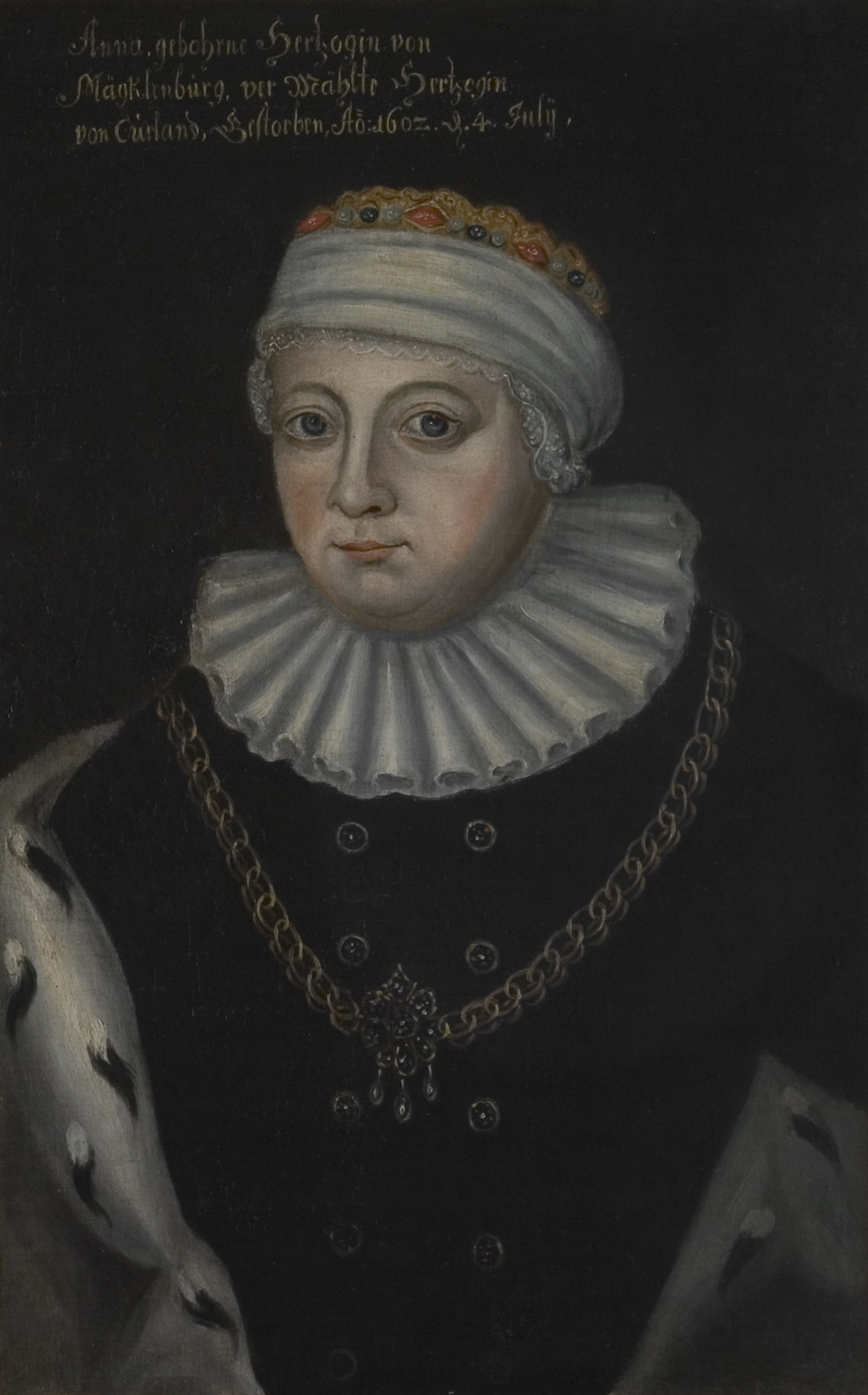
Anna of Mecklenburg died 4 July

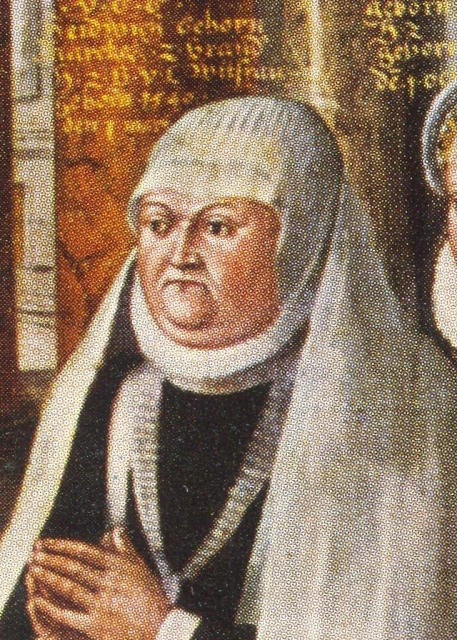
Hedwig of Brandenburg died 21 October

David I of Kakheti died 21 October

=== January–March ===
- January – Claude Fauchet, French historian
- February 3 – Paulus Melissus, German composer (b. 1539)
- February 13 – Alexander Nowell, English clergyman (b. 1507)
- February 19 – Philippe Emmanuel, Duke of Mercœur, French soldier (b. 1558)
- March 11 – Emilio de' Cavalieri, Italian composer (b. c. 1550)
- March 12 – Philip IV, Count of Nassau-Weilburg and Nassau-Saarbrücken (1574–1602) (b. 1542)
- March 22 – Agostino Carracci, Italian painter and graphical artist (b. 1557)
- March 24 – Ii Naomasa, Japanese general (b. 1561)
- March 25 – Joachim Frederick of Brieg, Duke of Wołów (b. 1550)

=== April–June ===
- April 8 – Ludvig Munk, Governor-general of Norway (b. 1537)
- April 10 – Amalia of Neuenahr, German noble (b. 1539)
- April 20 – Thomas Tichborne, English martyr (b. 1567)
- April 26 – Antonio Maria Salviati, Italian Catholic cardinal (b. 1537)
- May 9 – Giulio Antonio Santorio, Italian Catholic cardinal (b. 1532)
- May 22 – Renata of Lorraine (b. 1544)
- May 27 – Robert Stuart, Duke of Kintyre and Lorne, infant son of King James I/VI

=== July–September ===
- July 4 – Anna of Mecklenburg, Duchess consort of Courland (1566–1587) (b. 1533)
- July 7 – Friedrich Wilhelm I, Duke of Saxe-Weimar, German noble (b. 1562)
- July 31 – Charles de Gontaut, 1st Duke of Biron, French noble and military commander (b. 1562)
- August 12 – Abu'l-Fazl ibn Mubarak, Mughal vizier and historian (b. 1551)
- August 23 – Bastianino, Italian painter (b. c. 1536)
- September 14 – Jean Passerat, French writer (b. 1534)
- September 25
  - Caspar Peucer, German reformer (b. 1525)
  - William Redman, Bishop of Norwich (b. 1541)
- September 30 – Catherine of Brandenburg-Küstrin, daughter of Margrave John of Küstrin (b. 1549)

=== October–December ===
- October – Thomas Morley, English composer (b. 1557)
- October 1 – Hernando de Cabezón, Spanish composer and organist (b. 1541)
- October 7 – Thomas Schweicker, German artist (b. 1540)
- October 13 – Franciscus Junius, French theologian (b. 1545)
- October 20 – Walter Leveson, English Elizabethan Member of Parliament, Shropshire landowner (b. 1550)
- October 21
  - Hedwig of Brandenburg, Duchess of Brunswick-Wolfenbüttel, Duchess consort of Brunswick-Wolfenbüttel (b. 1540)
  - King David I of Kakheti (b. 1569)
- October 28 – John, Prince of Schleswig-Holstein, youngest son of Frederick II of Denmark and Norway (b. 1583)
- October 30 – Jean-Jacques Boissard, French antiquary and Latin poet (b. 1528)
- October 31 – Dominic Collins, Irish Jesuit lay brother and martyr (b. 1566)
- November 23 – Agnes of Solms-Laubach, Landgravine of Hesse-Kassel (b. 1578)
- November 29 – Anthony Holborne, English composer (b. c. 1545)
- December 1 – Kobayakawa Hideaki, Japanese samurai and warlord (b. 1577)
- December 29 – Jacopo Corsi, Italian composer (b. 1561)

=== Date unknown ===
- Epifani Olives i Terès, Spanish politician
- Oda Ujiharu, Japanese warlord (b. 1534)
- Valpuri Innamaa, Finnish shipowner
- Daniel Tossanus, French Reformed theologian (b. 1541)
