= Eleonora Ramirez di Montalvo =

- Stucco bust of Eleonora Ramirez di Montalvo by Giacomo Antonio Corbellini (1689)
- Born: 6 July 1602; Genoa, Republic of Genoa
- Died: 10 August 1659 (aged 57); Florence, Grand Duchy of Tuscany
- Occupations: Educator, writer, and poet
- Era: Counter-Reformation

Eleonora Ramirez di Montalvo (6 July 1602 – 10 August 1659) was an educator, writer, and poet from the Republic of Genoa. During her life she created two lay conservatories, Il Conventino and La Quiete. Her work has played a large role in the evolution of education for women.

== Life ==
Eleonora Ramirez di Montalvo was born in 1602 in Genoa, Italy. Her mother was Italian and her father was Spanish. Montalvo's father died when she was 5 years old. At the age of nine she was taken to the convent of San Jacopo in Via Ghibellina. She remained there for nine years. In 1620 she was removed from the convent and married to Orazio Landi. Five years after the marriage they separated. Though they were separated they remained married until Landi died in 1656 . Montalvo died shortly after in 1659.

== Education of Young Girls ==
In 1626 Montalvo began taking in poor and needy girls. She supported them financially as well as giving them religious, moral and cultural instruction. In 1627 her and the girls began moving to various houses until eventually in 1642 they moved to “casa dei Brandolini” in Via dell’Amore. They called it Il Conventino. The school itself was named the Congregation of the Ancille della Santissima Vergine or Handmaidens of the Blessed Virgin. Women from different backgrounds were welcome at Il Conventino. According to Jennifer Haraguchi, Montalvo struggled to “reconcile her desire to provide education to young women of all social classes with the Florentine Church’s position which at the time did not include the education of the poor.”

Eventually Montalvo desired to separate the girls of higher social status away from the girls of lower social class. In 1650 Montalvo opened a second conservatory for aristocratic girls located at Villa La Quiete. The school was named the Congregation of the Ancille della Santissima Trinità or Handmaidens of the Blessed Trinity. Though they were separate, Montalvo “advocated a combined instruction in religion, morals, reading, music, and dramatic performance” at both schools. Montalvo's unique educational pursuits were greatly supported by the Medici Family. Specifically, the Grand Duchess Vittoria della Rovere was a major supporter of Montalvo. She often made visits to La Quiete and completed the construction of a church there in 1688.

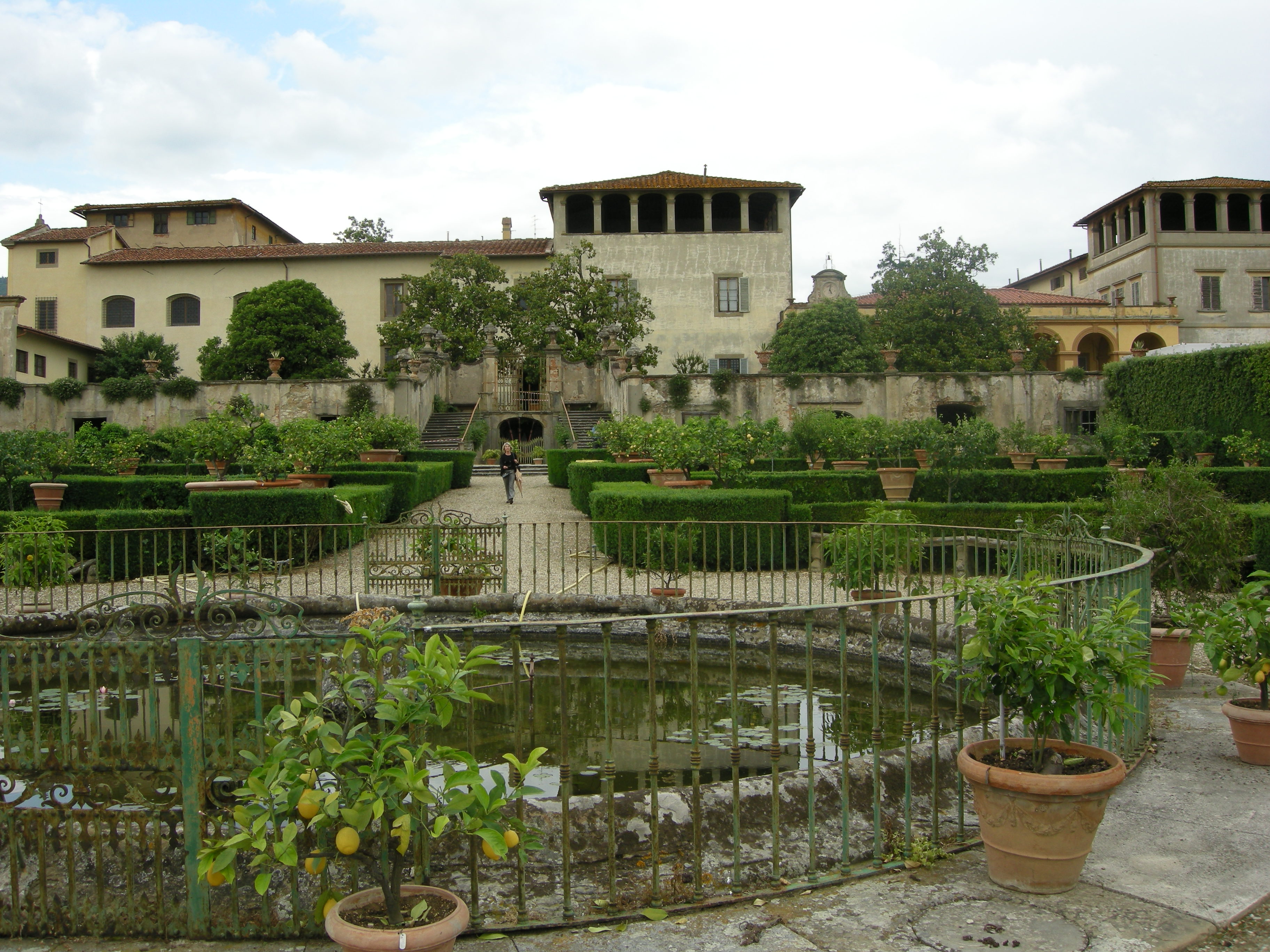
La Quiete today

== Teachings ==
Montalvo considered her schools an alternative to the roles of wife or nun that young girls often had to choose between during this time. In both conservatories Montalvo encouraged the teaching of writing, music, drama, domestic work, reading, sewing, and lessons on moral virtue. Though this level of education was typical for elite girls, most poor young girls worked as servants during this time period. While the curriculum at La Quiete was more advanced than Il Conventino's, the young elite were also taught how to complete domestic tasks such as cooking and cleaning laundry. Both Il Conventino and La Quiete “pushed the boundaries of educational expectations."

Montalvo used theatre specifically as a major component of her curriculum. This was not always the case. Originally Montalvo considered theatre a distraction and thus banned its practice in the Costituzioni of 1645. Fifteen years later she had changed her mind. In the Constituzioni for the Ancille della Santissma Trinita she permits the performance of plays that are based on the lives of saints.

== Writing ==
Montalvo produced several works throughout her life. She wrote several administrative handbooks for her conservatories: the Costituzioni (Regulations) of 1645 written for Il Conventino, the Costituzioni of 1656–7 for La Quiete, and the Istruzione alle maestre (Instruction for Teachers) for the teachers of La Quiete. Montalvo also composed a vita or autobiography that was never finished.

Montalvo was originally instructed to write her vita in 1636 by her confessor, Cosimo Pazzi. It was typical for catholic confessors to instruct women to write spiritual autobiographies or vita. These scittura segreta (secret writing) were meant to be analyzed by confessors so that they could better meet the woman's spiritual needs. Montalvo worked on her vita for 23 years. She began in 1636 (age 34) and continued to work on it until her death in 1659. This was not common for most women. Women were often commanded to write extensive accounts of their entire spiritual life and were given very little time. Once completed these accounts would be confiscated immediately and would sometimes be used to condemn the female authors as heretics.

Montalvo also composed many other works. She wrote plays, prayers, dramatic hagiographies, and two spiritual comedies: Rappresentazione delle virtù e de’ vizi (The Play of the Virtues and Vices) and Rappresentazione delli inganni della propria opinione (The Tricks Played By One's Own Opinion). Rappresentazione delle virtù e de’ vizi is about the struggle between the virtues “Prudence, Humility, Peace, Modesty, and Happiness” and the vices of “Stupidity, Dissoluteness, Discord, and Melancholy.” Her second play, Rappresentazione delli inganni della propria opinione, is about “the danger of trusting one’s own opinion and opposing the good rule of the superiors.” Bartolomeo Guidi explains that all of Montalvo's works were “intended for the instruction, inspiration, and enjoyment of the young women of her conservatories."

In a broader context, writing sacred literature was not completely uncommon for women during this time. At the beginning of the 1580s a push to create religious narratives was just beginning. Montalvo was one of the first women to begin producing such works along with other women of the time.

== Legacy ==
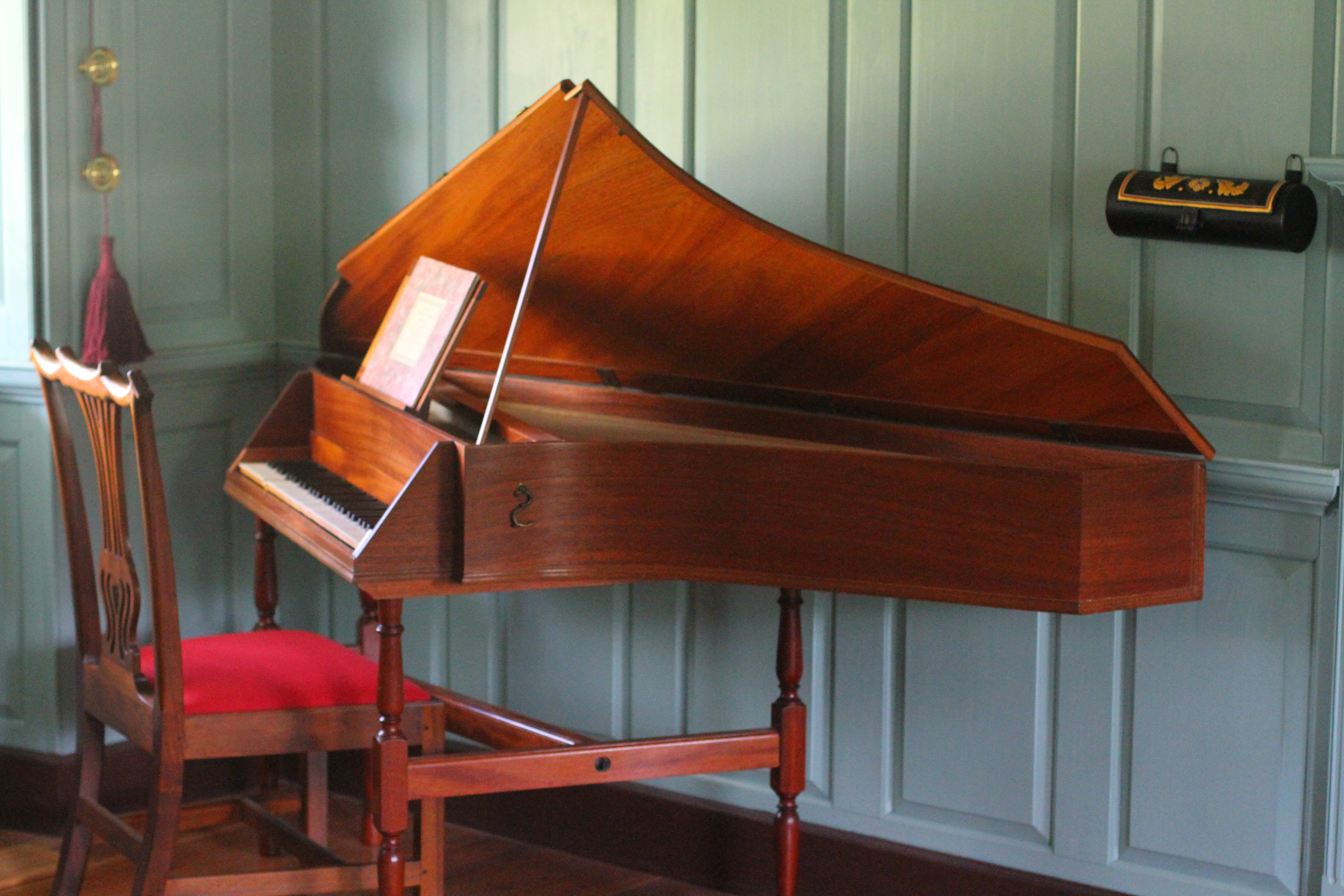
Example of a spinet

Jennifer Haraguchi states:

Montalvo was a pioneer in women’s education who pushed against societal expectations that young women should prepare themselves only for marriage or the convent. Montalvo offered a revolutionary ‘third path’ where women — affluent or not — did not have to be nuns to increase their knowledge of spiritual concepts and to have intense spiritual experiences

Today, Montalvo's spinet and bedroom are preserved at La Quiete. Several of her personal items have been kept, including her bed, blankets, devotional objects, her oil lamp, eating utensils, and several items of clothing.

Montalve church, interior, tomb of eleonora ramirez de montalvo, stucco by Giacomo Antonio Corbellini (1689)
