= Massimo Santoro Tubito =

Italian priest and writer

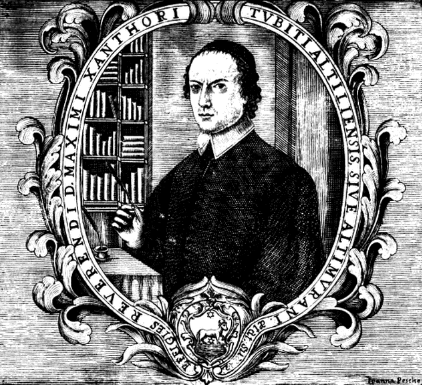
- Born: December 1660; Altamura, Kingdom of Naples
- Died: Unknown; Unknown
- Occupation: priest
- Known for: the book De Antichristo (1712)

Massimo Santoro Tubito or Latin: Maximus Xanthorus Tubitus (December 1660 - ...) was an Italian priest and writer. He's best known for his books Divinum Theatrum (1702) and De Antichristo (1712), both of them written in Latin. The subjects covered are history and religion.

The books are also known because he refers to himself as Latin: Altiliensis, seu Altamuranus which means "Altiliens or Altamuran", denoting that he was from the Apulian city of Altamura. Altiliensis refers to the legends about the founding of the city of Altamura, whose ancient name is believed to have been Altilia.

The toponym Altilia lacks historical evidence, and most scholars - such as Ottavio Serena - tend to reject it. According to other historians, such as Tommaso Berloco (1985), there isn't enough evidence either to dismiss the toponym or to prove it.

== Life ==
Massimo Santoro Tubito was born in Altamura on December 1660. His father was Angelo Tubito, while his mother was Angela Perillo. His brother was Michele Tubito, an apostolic protonotary. Both the death date and the death place are unknown.

He was member of the so-called Accademia degli Spensierati.

== In media ==
- Cesare Orlandi (1734-1779) cites Santoro Tubito in the first volume of his work.
- Massimo Santoro Tubito and his book De Antichristo are cited in Carlo Animato's book Roma kaputt mundi (2012).

== See also ==
- Antichrist
- Altamura

== Works ==
- Massimo Santoro Tubito (1702). Divinum Theatrum (in Latin). Naples: Domenico Antonio Parrino.
- Massimo Santoro Tubito (1712). Curiosissimus de Antichristo Liber (in Latin). Naples: Domenico Roselli.

== Bibliography ==
- Berloco, Tommaso (1985). Storie inedite della città di Altamura. ATA - Associazione Turistica Altamurana Pro Loco.
- Orlandi, Cesare (1770). Delle città d'Italia e sue isole adjacenti [sic] compendiose notizie - Volume I. Perugia: Stamperia Augusta, presso Mario Riginaldi.
- Animato, Carlo (2012). Roma kaputt mundi. Lulu. ISBN 9781471654800.
