= Claude-François Fraguier =

French churchman and writer

Claude François Fraguier (27 August 1660, Paris – 3 May 1728, Paris) was a French churchman and writer.

Fraguier became a Jesuit at a young age, but he left the order in 1694 to devote himself to literature. A classicist and author of dissertations on classical history, he was professor of theology at Caen and collaborated on the Journal des savants. He was a friend of Huet, Segrais, Mme de Lafayette and Ninon de Lenclos.

He was elected to the Académie des inscriptions et belles-lettres in 1705 and to the Académie française in 1717.

Voltaire said of him in his Siècle de Louis XIV "he was a good littérateur and full of taste. He put Plato's philosophy into good Latin verse. He would have done better to have written good French verse."
