= Merces baronets =

Extinct baronetcy in the Baronetage of England

The Merces Baronetcy, of France, was a title in the Baronetage of England. It was created on 2 April 1660 for Anthony de Merces, a French gentleman. However, nothing further is known of him or any possible descendants.

== Merces baronets, of France (1660) ==
- Sir Anthony de Merces, 1st Baronet
