= Hubert Gautier =

French engineer (1660–1737)

Henri Gautier
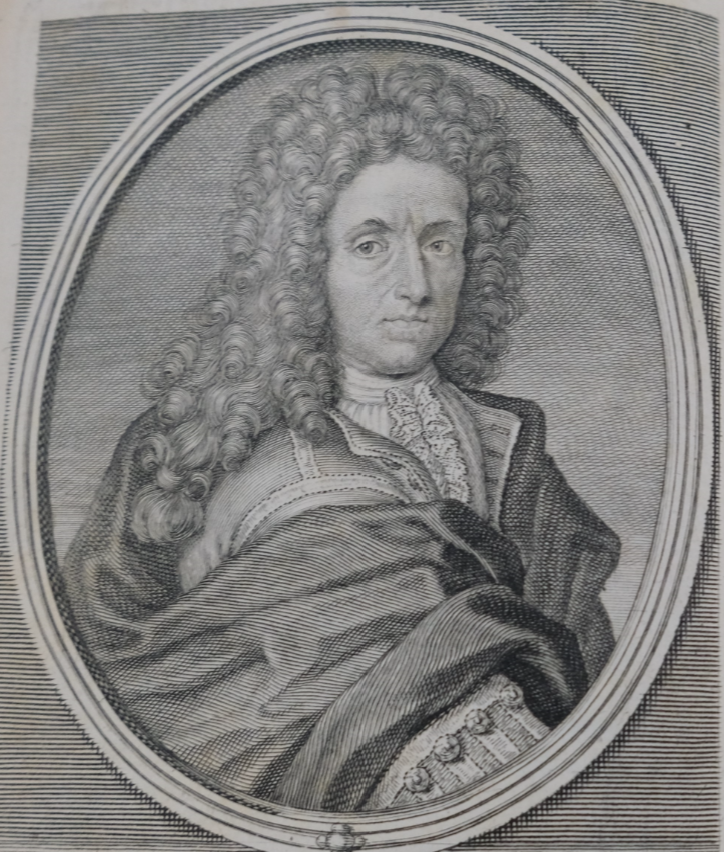
- Portrait of Gautier in a 1732 copy of "La bibliotheque des philosophes"
- Born: 21 August 1660; Nîmes, Languedoc, France
- Died: 27 September 1737 (aged 77); Paris, France

Henri Gautier, sometimes called Hubert Gautier (21 August 1660 – 27 September 1737) was a French engineer. He was born in Nîmes, France.

== Career ==
Gautier initially trained as a medical doctor, turning to mathematics and finally engineering. He served as an engineer for 28 years in the province of Languedoc. He was appointed Inspecteur général des ponts et chaussées in 1713, and moved to Paris where he continued working until his retirement in 1731.

In 1716, he wrote the first book on building bridges, Traité des ponts.

The contractors do not hesitate to enrich themselves at the expense of the King or of those who work for them; & the engineers or inspectors of the works, on the contrary, have only in mind the honesty with which they act and to be highly esteemed; & they do not hesitate to regard the former as their enemies, when they are unfaithful.

— Hubert Gautier, Traite des Ponts (1716)

He died in Paris, France at the age of 77.

== Publications ==
Gautier wrote several published works on engineering, civil engineering and geology.

- La bibliotheque des philosophes, volumes I-II
- Traité de la construction des chemins
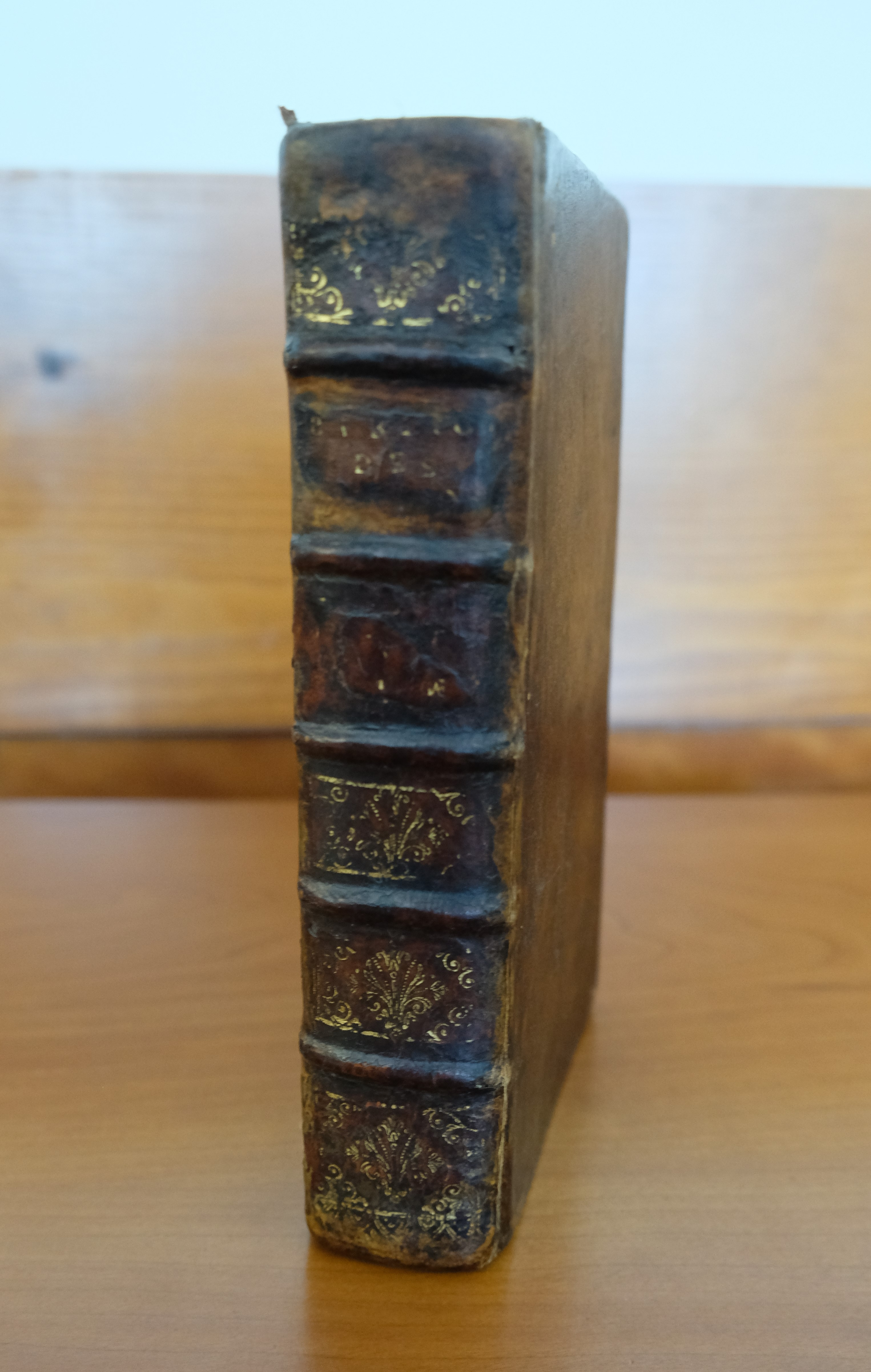
1723 copy of Volume I of H. Gautier, "La bibliotheque des philosophes"

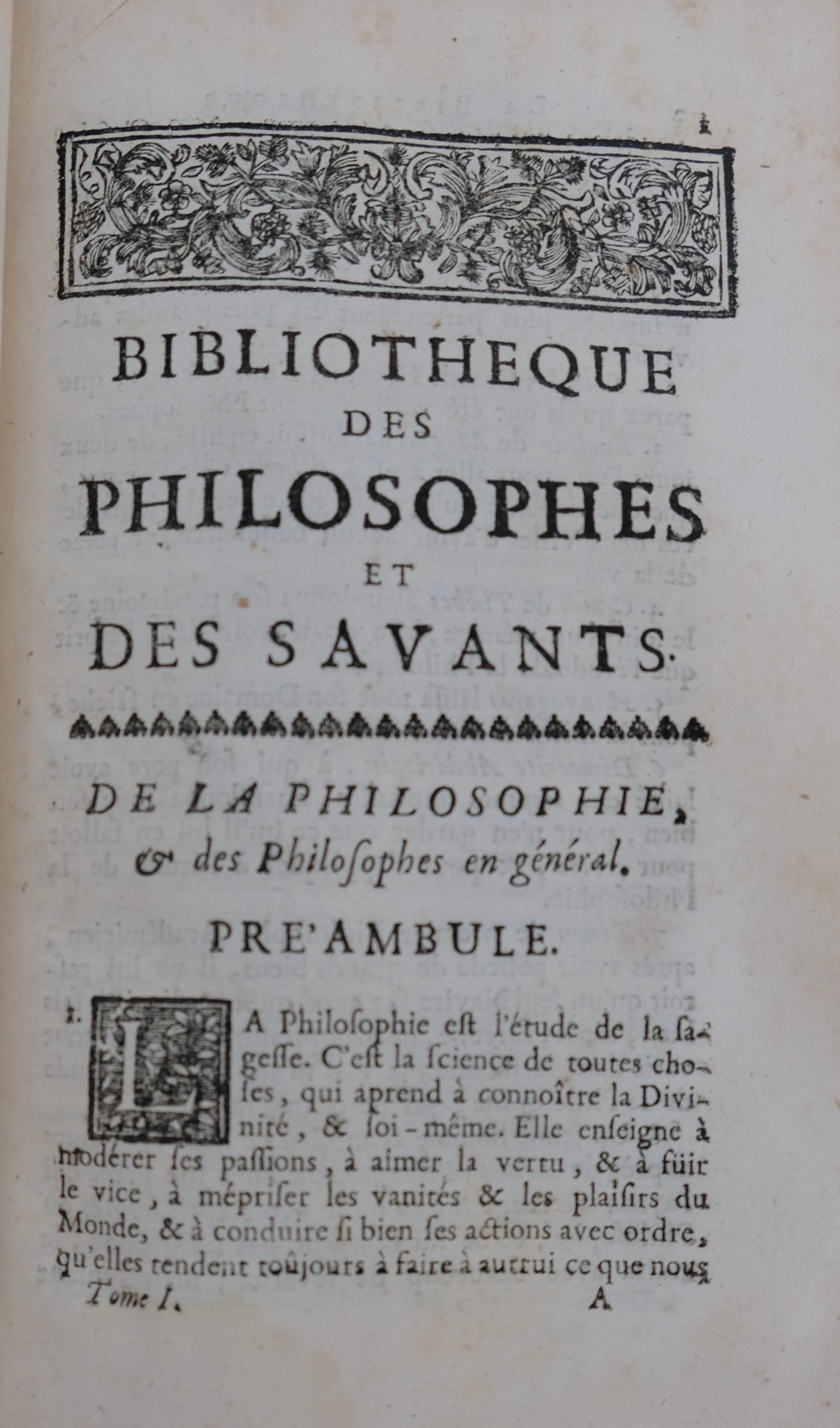
Title page to "La bibliotheque des philosophes"

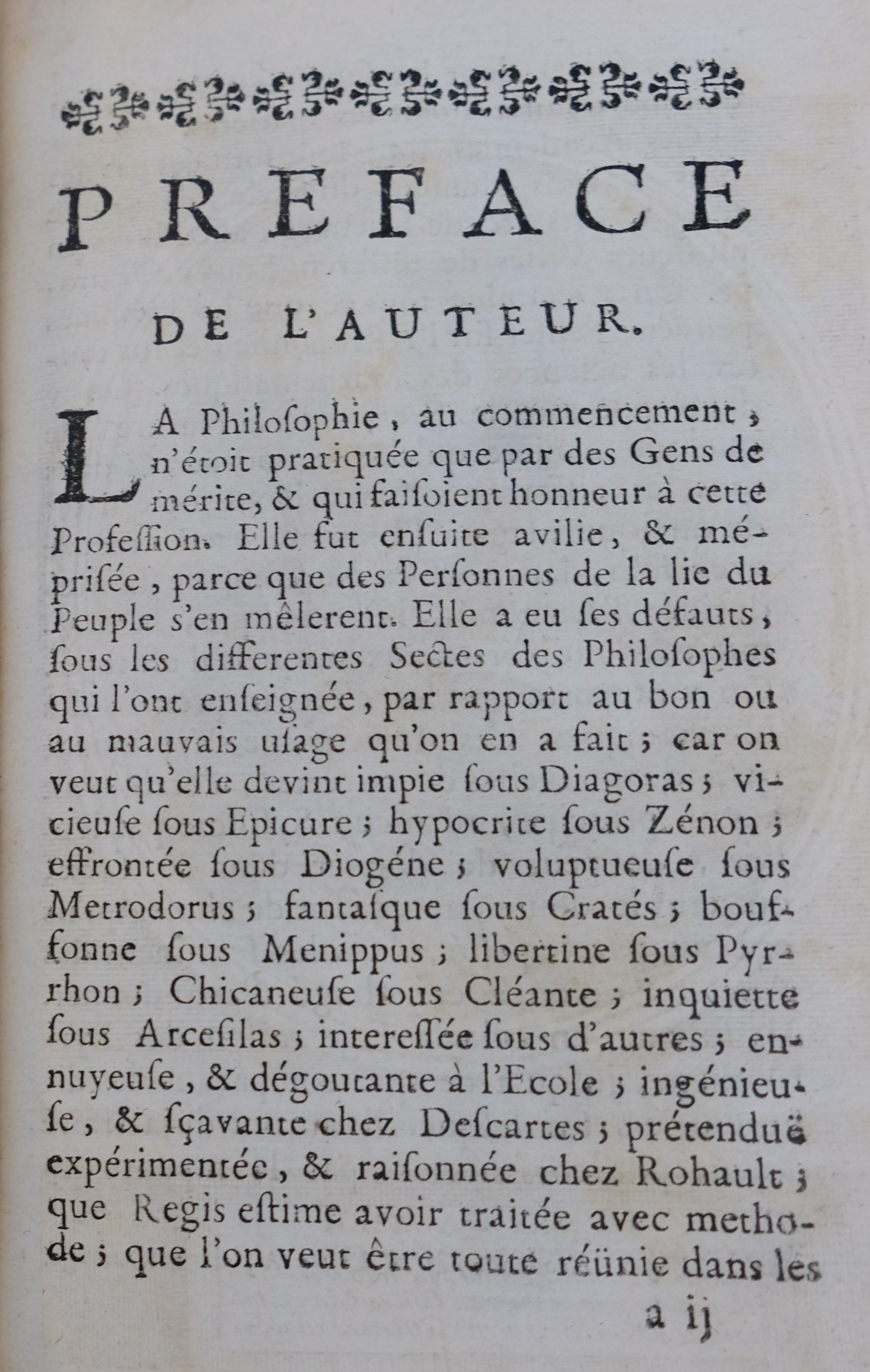
Preface to "La bibliotheque des philosophes"

== See also ==
- Pierre-Marie-Jérôme Trésaguet
- Thomas Telford
- John Loudon McAdam
