= Daniel Knudsen Bildt =

Daniel Knudsen Bildt (born 12 April 1602 in Båhuslen, died 22 June 1651) was a Dano-Norwegian military officer and a large estate owner in Norway. From 1644, he was War Commissioner. He is the ancestor of the Swedish noble Bildt family. He was married to Dorothea Jensdatter Bjelke (1612–1674), a daughter of the Norwegian Chancellor Jens Bjelke.
