= Valborg Innamaa =

Finnish merchant (1540–1602)

Valborg Eriksdotter Innamaa (Finnish: Valpuri Eerikintytär Innamaa; before 1550 – c. 1602) was a Finnish merchant and shipowner in Åbo (Turku), Sweden (now Finland).

== Life ==
She was married to Henrik Johannes Innamaa. Her spouse was known as a supporter of John III of Sweden, and died when the troops of Eric XIV of Sweden took Åbo from John in 1563, after which the Innama family's merchant ships were confiscated by king Eric. She inherited the merchant house of her late spouse and exported iron to the king. In 1571, she is listed as the richest merchant in the city of Åbo in existing tax records.

Innamaa worked for the restoration of the ships, which was granted in 1582. She revived the business enterprise of her late spouse and transported goods from all over the Baltic Sea, carrying goods to Sweden, especially Stockholm. She exported butter, animal skins, fish and horses and imported salt, weapons, wine and spices. She was the most powerful shipowner in Åbo: she granted loans to the Swedish monarch and equipped the Swedish army during John III's Livonian war. Her good relations with the crown gave her efficient protection during her various lawsuits. She also owned land and buildings.

She was married three times more after she was widowed: to Peder Ingevadsson, Olof Karlsson and Lukas Larsson (in Finnish, Peter Ingvaldinpoika, Olavi Karls, and Luke Laurin). It was common for a widow in Sweden (with Finland) to continue the trade of her late spouse, but normally she did so only temporary, until the business could be taken over by a male relative or husband. Despite her remarriages, which formally placed her under the guardianship of her husbands, she kept sole control over her business until her death. She had two daughters, and her business was inherited by her grandson Bertil Innamaa.

== Legacy ==
A street in Turku is named after her.

Innamaa was the subject of the novel Western Winds by Kristiina Vuori.
