= Anne Holck =

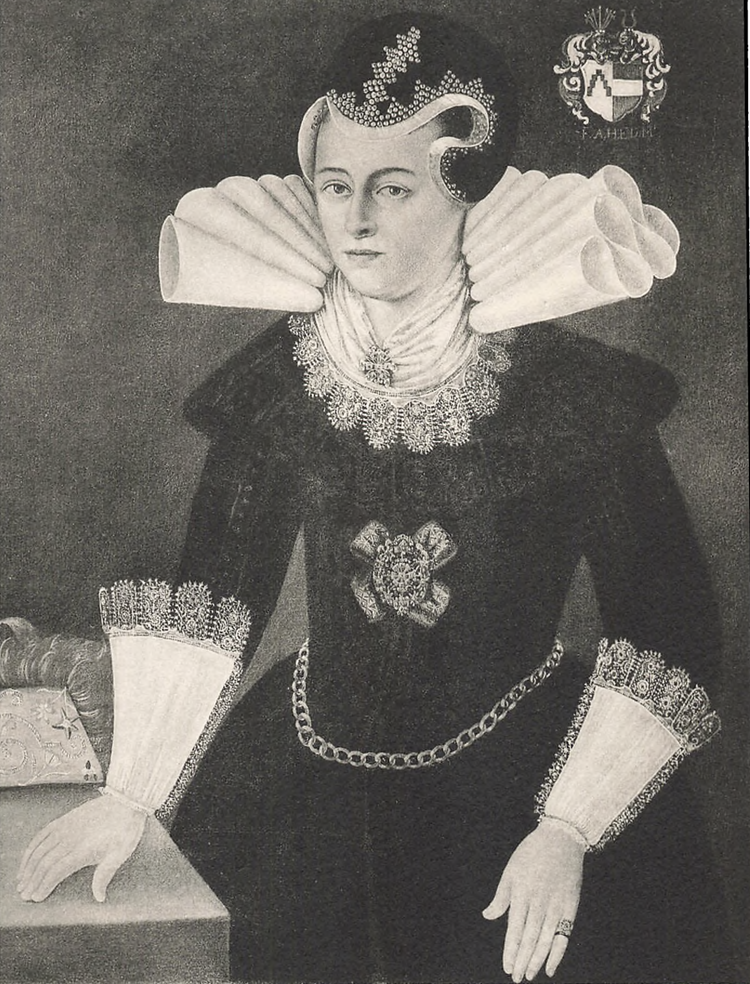
- Born: 7 December 1602
- Died: 5 June 1660 (aged 57)
- Battles / wars: Dano-Swedish War

Anne Holck (7 December 1602, Tryggevælde - 5 June 1660, Stensgaard, Langeland) was a Danish noble. She became famous for her defense of the island of Langeland against the Swedish army during the Dano-Swedish War (1658–1660) in 1659.

She was the daughter of noble Ditlev Holck and married nobleman Vincents Steensen until Stensgaard from Langeland in 1623. In 1659, her spouse died from the wounds he received when he led the defense of Langeland against Swedish invasion, and after his death, she took over and defended the island against the attack until she was forced to surrender. After having been captured and imprisoned on her estate, she managed to trick a Swedish troupe down a vine cellar, where they were killed by local peasantry.
