= 1590s =

Decade

The 1590s decade ran from January 1, 1590, to December 31, 1599.

== Events ==
=== 1590 ===
==== January–March ====
- January 6 – García Hurtado de Mendoza becomes the new Viceroy of Peru (nominally including most of South America except for Brazil). He will serve until 1596.
- January 10 – Construction of the Fortezza Nuova around the city of Livorno begins in Italy in the Grand Duchy of Tuscany on the orders of Ferdinando I de' Medici, Grand Duke of Tuscany and continues for more than 14 years.
- January 25 – Luis de Velasco y Castilla, Marquess of Salinas, becomes the new Viceroy of New Spain, a colony comprising most of Central America, Mexico and what is now a large part of the southwestern United States. Velasco will govern until 1595, and then again from 1607 to 1611.
- February 3 – Peter Ernst I von Mansfeld-Vorderort, the German-born commander of the Spanish Imperial Army captures the German fortress of Rheinberg after a four-year long siege during the Eighty Years' War.
- March 4 – Maurice of Nassau, Prince of Orange, takes Breda, by concealing 68 of his best men in a peat-boat, to get through the impregnable defenses.
- March 14 – Battle of Ivry: Henry IV of France again defeats the forces of the Catholic League, under Charles, Duke of Mayenne.
- March 21 – The Treaty of Constantinople is signed between the Ottoman Empire (in modern-day Turkey) and the Safavid Empire (modern-day Iran), ending a 12-year war between the two nations.

==== April–June ====
- April 4 – The Cortes of Castile approves a new subsidy, the millones.
- April 24 – Ten armed English merchant vessels of the Levant Company are intercepted by 12 galleys of the Spanish Navy while attempting to pass through the Straits of Gibraltar after trading in the Mediterranean Sea. Levant Company's Benedict Barnham, on the flagship Salomon, leads the corporate fleet in a six-hour battle and heavily damages the Spanish ships, clearing the way for the company ships to return home.
- May 7 – King Henry of Navarre, claimant to the throne of France, begins an unsuccessful attempt to besiege Paris, at the time controlled by the Catholic League. By August 30, Henry is forced to raise the siege, when Alexander Farnese, Duke of Parma comes to its rescue with a Spanish army.
- May 17 – Anne of Denmark is crowned queen consort of Scotland, at Holyrood Abbey in Edinburgh.
- June 23 – The Japanese samurai Toyotomi Hideyoshi sends an army of 15,000 men, led by generals Maeda Toshiie and Uesugi Kagekatsu, in an attack on the Hachiōji Castle in what is now Tokyo. The castle is lightly defended, by only 1,300 men, because the samurai Hōjō Ujiteru has most of his troops engaged in defending Hideyohsi's siege of Odawara. The castle is captured after one day, and later destroyed on orders of the shogun Tokugawa Ieyasu.

==== July–September ====
- July 1 (13th waning of 1st Ashadha, 952 CS) – Naresuan Maharat becomes the new ruler of Thailand as Sanphet II of the Ayutthaya Kingdom, upon the death of his father, Sanphet I.
- July 19 – The day after his 12th birthday, Ferdinand of Habsburg becomes the new Archduke of Inner Austria (Innerösterreich) upon the death, in Graz, of his father Charles II. A regency council rules in the place of Ferdinand until 1596.
- July 21 – Japan's first diplomatic representatives to Europe, Itō Mancio, Michele Chijiwa, Giuliano Nakaura and Martino Hara, return to Japan after eight years, having departed on February 20, 1582.
- August 4 – In Japan, the siege of Odawara, part of Toyotomi Hideyoshi's campaign to eliminate the clan of samurais led by Hōjō Ujinao, ends with the surrender of Odawara, part of Toyotomi's unification of the country.
- August 18 – John White, governor of the Colony of Roanoke, returns to Roanoke after having left the North American colony in 1587 to get supplies. Upon arrival at, the crew of the ships Hopewell and Moonlight find that the Roanoke Colony is deserted, with the only clues to where the colonist went being the word "CRO" carved into a tree, and the word CROATOAN (believed to be a reference to Hatteras Island, where the colonists formerly lived).
- August 27 – Pope Sixtus V dies after serving for five years, and a new papal conclave is organized, to start on September 7 at the Apostolic Palace in Rome.
- September 5 – Alexander Farnese's army forces Henry IV of France to lift the siege of Paris.
- September 15
  - After the eight day conclave, Giovanni Battista Castagna, the Cardinal-Priest of San Marcello al Corso receives the necessary two-thirds majority despite support for Cardinal Marco Antonio Colonna. Castagna takes becomes Pope Urban VII but contracts malaria and dies 12 days later.
  - The estimated 6.0 magnitude Neulengbach earthquake causes significant damage and some loss of life, in Lower Austria and Vienna; the effects are felt as far as Bohemia and Silesia.

==== October–December ====
- October 6 – Two days before the scheduled papal conclave begins, Enrique de Guzmán, 2nd Count of Olivares, Spain's ambassador to the Papal States, presents the cardinals with King the recommendations of King Philip II of Spain, a set of candidates whom the Spanish cardinals will support, and 30 whom they are instructed not to vote for.
- October 8 – The second papal conclave in less four weeks two months opens at the Apostolic Palace in Rome, 23 days after the previous conclave had been concluded, and 53 cardinals arrive.
- October 13
  - (5th waxing of Tazaungmon 952 ME) – In what is now Myanmar, King Nanda Bayin of Burma sends a 10,000-man army, led by the Viceroy Thado Dhamma Yaza III of Prome, and General Natshinnaung to suppress a rebellion in the Shan state of Mogaung.
  - German astronomer Michael Maestlin becomes the first person to record an observation of the occultation of the planet Mars by the planet Venus.
- October 16 – Saadian invasion of the Songhai Empire: An army of 20,000 troops, led by Judar Pasha is dispatched from Marrakesh in the Saadi Sultanate (now Morocco), on orders of Sultan Ahmad al-Mansur. The Saadi Army's objective is to conquer the Songhai Empire, led by the Emperor Askia Ishaq II, in North Africa, corresponding to what is now the Republic of Mali.
- October 24 – After an unsuccessful search of the "lost colony" of Roanoke, English officer John White and the surviving crew of the ships Hopewell and Moonlight return to England on October 24.
- November 22 (12th waning of Tazaungmon 952 ME) – Burmese King Nanda Bayin sends a his son, the Crown Prince Mingyi Swa and 20,000 troops to what is now Thailand.
- November 29 – A truce is signed between representatives of the Holy Roman Empire (ruled by Emperor Rudolf II) and the Ottoman Empire (ruled by Sultan Murad III.
- December 5 – Niccolò Sfondrato, Cardinal-priest of Santa Cecilia in Trastevere, is elected as the new pope and takes the name Pope Gregory XIV. Sfondrato is selected as a compromise candidate after Gabriele Paleotti falls 3 votes short of being elected.
- December 7 – North Berwick witch trials: Agnes Sampson is questioned by King James VI of Scotland, and confesses to practising witchcraft. She will be executed on January 28.

==== Date unknown ====
- Orthodox Patriarch Meletius I of Alexandria succeeds Silvester.
- The Spanish are pushed out of southern Gelderland by the Dutch forces.

=== 1591 ===
==== January–March ====
- January 27 – Scottish schoolmaster John Fian becomes the first person to be executed after the North Berwick witch trials, following his conviction for the crime of witchcraft. Fian is taken to the Castlehill outside of Edinburgh and strangled after which his body is burned. Agnes Sampson is garroted the next day at Castehill and then burned.
- February 7 – Pope Gregory XIV, who had succeeded Pope Urban VII in December, appoints Cardinal Marco Antonio Colonna and six other cardinals to a commission to revise the Sixtine Vulgate Latin translation of the Bible, published in 1590 under the editorship of Pope Sixtus V, to which the College of Cardinals has taken exception. The revision of the revision, dubbed the Sixto-Clementine Vulgate, will be completed in 1592 and be the official version used by the Catholic Church until 1979.
- February 25 – Poet Edmund Spenser is granted an annual pension of 50 pounds sterling by Queen Elizabeth I of England in recognition of his publication of The Faerie Queen. The pension is paid in quarterly installments of 12s. 10d. on March 25, June 24, September 29 and December 25.
- March 1 – Pope Gregory XIV excommunicates King Henry IV of France and orders the clergy, nobles, judicial functionaries and the Third Estate of France to renounce the nation's king.
- March 13 – Battle of Tondibi: In Mali, forces sent by the Saadi dynasty ruler of Morocco, Ahmad al-Mansur, and led by Judar Pasha, defeat the Songhai Empire, despite being outnumbered by at least five to one.
- March 21 – Pope Gregory XIV issues the papal bull Cogit nos, prohibiting the placing of bets on the outcome of papal elections, the length of time that a pope will reign, or who will be appointed as a cardinal.

==== April–June ====
- April 10
  - The emancipation of Filipino slaves in the Spanish Philippines along with reparations to former slaves, with the threat of excommunication of any Spanish slaveholder who refuses to comply, is ordered by Pope Gregory XIV in the papal bull Cum Sicuti.
  - English merchant James Lancaster sets off on a voyage to the East Indies.
- April 21 – Japanese tea-master Sen no Rikyū commits seppuku, on the order of Toyotomi Hideyoshi.
- May 15 – In Russia, Tsarevich Dimitri, son of Ivan the Terrible, is found dead in mysterious circumstances, at the palace in Uglich. The official explanation is that he has cut his own throat during an epileptic seizure. Many believe he has been murdered by his rival, Boris Godunov, who becomes tsar.
- May 24 – Sir John Norreys, with an expeditionary force sent by Queen Elizabeth I of England, takes the town of Guingamp in Brittany after a brief siege, on behalf of Henry of Navarre.
- May 30
  - Timbuktu is captured by an expedition of Arma people sent by the Saadi ruler of Morocco and led by Judar Pasha.
  - Zutphen is captured by the Dutch and English, under Maurice of Nassau.
- June 10 – Deventer is captured by the Dutch, under Maurice of Nassau.
- June 26 – The siege of the Spanish Netherlands city of Delfzijl is started by Maurice, Prince of Orange, stadtholder of the Dutch Republic, who leads a Dutch and English Army against the Spanish defenders. Delfzijl falls after six days, and is surrendered on July 2.

==== July–September ====
- July 13 – A Crimean army, led by the Tatar Khan Ğazı II Giray, begins a siege of Moscow.
- July 15 – The Battle of the Berlengas takes place off of the coast of Portugal as the Earl of Cumberland's five English privateers are surprised by five Spanish galleys commanded by General Francisco Coloma, commander of the Armada de Guarda Costa. Cumberland's ship, the Golden Noble, is captured.
- July 18 (6 Shawal 999 AH) – In India, the four-day Battle of Bhuchar Mori ends in the Gujarat state, as General Mirza Aziz Koka leads the Mughal Empire gains a decisive victory over Nawanagar, led by the Sultan Muzaffar Shah III.
- July 22 – The Durtnell (Dartnell) family of Brasted, Kent, England, begin to work as building contractors. The business continues under thirteen generations of the family until ceasing to trade in 2019.
- July 25 – Siege of Knodsenburg: Dutch Republic staatholder Maurice of Nassau and English General Francis Vere defeat the Duke of Parma outside Nijmegen after a four-day siege.
- August 1 – Serdar Ferhad Pasha is appointed the new Grand Vizier of the Ottoman Empire by Sultan Murad III, replacing Koca Sinan Pasha following a revolt of the Janissaries.
- August 9 – The Khan of the Crimean Tatara, Ğazı II Giray, is wounded by the defenders against his siege of Moscow. Gazi's brother, Fetih I Giray, continues the siege, which is finally settled with a peace agreement and payment of 10,000 rubles in 1594.
- August 29 – Peter the Lame, ruler of the Principality of Moldavia (part of modern-day Romania and of Moldova) abdicates in Iași after having reigned for most of the previous 17 years. Peter's downfall comes after he is unable to raise the money paid as tribute to the Ottoman Empire. He is replaced by Aaron the Tyrant (Aron Vodă).
- August 30 – The Battle of Flores begins off Flores Island (Azores). By September 1, the Spanish fleet is victorious over the English and captures the English ship Revenge, fatally wounding Richard Grenville.
- September 4 – The Kunohe rebellion, which was started by Kunohe Masazane on March 13 on northern Honshu island in Japan's Mutsu Province (in the modern-day Iwate Prefecture), is suppressed by the samurai Toyotomi Hideyoshi, Chancellor of the Realm. The victory completes the unification of Japan.
- September 5 – A storm near the Azores in the North Atlantic begins, sinking a large number of the Spanish ships, including the recently-captured HMS Revenge. During August and September, at least eight intense hurricanes occur in the most severe of the pre-1600 seasons on record.
- September 14 – Siege of Hulst: Hulst is captured by Maurice of Orange, the staatholder of the Dutch Republic.

==== October–December ====
- October 8 – The Separation Edict, a law imposing an immobile social class structure in Japan, is promulgated by Toyotomi Hideyoshi.
- October 16 – Pope Gregory XIV dies from an attack of gallstones and leaves the Papacy of the Roman Catholic Church vacant for the third time in 14 months. The Pope, formerly Cardinal Niccolò Sfondrati, had served for only 10 months after being elected on December 5, 1590.
- October 19 – The Islamic calendar year 1000 A.H. begins with the first day of the month of Muharram, with concerns that the new year will herald the end of the world. When the year ends on October 7, 1592, without an apocalypse, the official interpretation among Ottoman Muslims is that the Ottoman Empire "had come closer to perfection than any other Muslim state.
- October 21 – The city of Nijmegen is captured from Spanish occupiers by Maurice of Orange, the staatholder of the Dutch Republic.
- October 26 – The Portuguese invasion of the Jaffna Kingdom begins on the north side of the island of Sri Lanka.
- October 29 – Giovanni Antonio Facchinetti is elected on the third ballot to succeed the late Pope Gregory XIV, after Cardinal Ludovico Madruzzo withdraws his candidacy. and takes the name Pope Innocent IX.
- November 3 – The coronation of Pope Innocent IX takes place in Rome as Cardinal Andreas von Österreich places the crown on the head of Giovanni Facchinetti.
- November 6 – Hundred Years' Croatian–Ottoman War: The Ottoman Empire successfully captures the Croatian rebel fort of Ripač.
- November 11 – King Henry IV of France begins the siege of Rouen, the Spanish-held capital of Normandy. The Spanish Navy arrives after five months and King Henry abandons the siege on April 20.
- November 27 – In Italy, Giovanni Giustiniani Campi is elected as the new Doge of the Republic of Genoa after a 12-day search for a successor to Battista Negrone.
- December 10 – Four Roman Catholic priests and three laymen are executed in England in a campaign against the Roman Catholic Church.
- December 18 – Pope Innocent IX begins a tour of the seven pilgrimage churches around Rome, despite being unwell, and his illness worsens. He dies 12 days later.
- December 27 – Francis Stewart, Earl of Bothwell leads the attack on the Holyrood Palace in Edinburgh. Having been alerted by a premature attack on the palace's prison, King James VI of Scotland and Queen Anne are able to take refuge within the castle, and the raid fails. Seven of Bothwell's men are subsequently captured and hanged.
- December 30 – Pope Innocent IX dies only two months after having been elected as the Pontiff of the Roman Catholic Church, leaving the Papacy vacant for the 4th time in 16 months.

==== Date unknown ====
- The city of Hyderabad, India, is founded by Muhammad Quli Qutb Shah.
- The Rialto Bridge in Venice, designed by Antonio da Ponte, is completed.
- The first of the Conimbricenses commentaries on Aristotle, by the Jesuits of the University of Coimbra, is published.
- The Siamese-Cambodian War begins.
- The defeated Askia dynasty move to the Dendi province in modern-day Niger.

=== 1592 ===
==== January–March ====
- January 29 – Cardinal Ippolito Aldobrandini of San Pancrazio is elected as the new Pontiff of the Roman Catholic Church after Ludovico Madruzzo and Giulio Antonio Santori withdraw following 19 rounds of voting by the 54 cardinals present. Cardinal Santori had received 28 votes on the first ballot, eight short of the necessary two-thirds majority required, and fewer on the rounds that followed. Aldobrandini is crowned the next day as Pope Clement VIII, the 231st pope. Clement succeeds Pope Innocent IX, who died on December 30, 1591. He immediately recalls the Sixtine Vulgate.
- February 7 – George Gordon, 1st Marquess of Huntly, sets fire to Donibristle Castle in Scotland and murders James Stewart, 2nd Earl of Moray.
- March 3 – Trinity College Dublin, Ireland's oldest university, is founded.
- March 14 – Ultimate Pi Day: the largest correspondence between calendar dates and significant digits of pi since the introduction of the Julian calendar according to the American method of writing the number of the month prior to the day.

==== April–June ====
- April 4 – The future Henry IV of France, King designate of Henry III of France, announces in a declaration, so-called "Expedient," his intention to take instruction in, and convert to, the Catholic religion.
- April 13 – The Japanese invasions of Korea (1592–98) begin with the Siege of Busanjin.
- April 20 – King Henry IV of France ends the siege of Rouen, the Spanish-held capital of Normandy, five months after its November 11 commencement, as the Spanish Navy arrives to relieve the city.
- April 24 – Battle of Sangju: The Japanese are victorious over the Koreans fighting for the Kingdom of Joseon.
- April 28 – Battle of Ch'ungju: Japan inflicts a decisive defeat on Korea.
- May 7
  - The Malta plague epidemic begins when galleys from the Grand Duchy of Tuscany arrive on the island with 100 prisoners of war from Egypt, and 20 ill crewmembers; over the next 18 months, 3,000 people on Malta die of the bubonic plague.
  - Battle of Okpo: The Korean navy is victorious over Japan.
- May 20 –August 19 – Battle of Flores (Anglo-Spanish War (1585–1604)), a series of naval engagements in the Azores in which the English are victorious, taking the great Portuguese carrack Madre de Deus on or about August 3.
- May 29 – Battle of Sacheon: Korean admiral Yi Sun-sin destroys all 13 Japanese ships taking part, using his improved turtle ship for the first time in battle.
- June 2 – Battle of Dangpo:The Korean navy is again victorious over Japan.
- June 10 – The Siege of Bihać begins in the Kingdom of Croatia, by Telli Hasan Pasha (Hasan Predojević) of the Ottoman Empire. Bihać is captured on June 19 and is lost for Croatia forever.

==== July–September ====
- July 20 – The Japanese capture the Korean capital Hanyang, causing Seonjo to request the assistance of Ming dynasty Chinese forces, who recapture the city a year later.
- July 30 – Alonso de Sotomayor petitions the viceroy of Peru for more troops to help resist attacks by Indians and English pirates.
- August – 1592–1593 London plague breaks out in England.
- August 9 – English explorer John Davis, commander of the Desire, probably discovers the Falkland Islands.
- August 14 – Battle of Hansan Island: The Korean navy defeats the Japanese.
- September 1 – Battle of Busan: The Korean fleet makes a surprise attack on the Japanese but fails to break their supply lines to Busan.
- September 7 – The captured Madre de Deus enters Dartmouth harbour in England and is then subjected to mass theft.

==== October–December ====
- October 5 – Siege of Jinju: The Korean navy is victorious over the Japanese.
- November 3 – The city of San Luis Potosí is founded.
- November 4 – (2nd waxing of Natdaw, 954 ME) In a war between what are now the nations of Myanmar and Thailand, the Army of Burma, led by King Nanda Bayin Burma (Toungoo) begins its invasion of the Kingdom of Siam (Ayutthaya), defended by King Naresuan.
- November 9 – The Sixto-Clementine Vulgate, an updated edition of the Latin language translation of the Bible, is promulgated by the Roman Catholic Church.
- November 12 – The Collegium Melitense is founded in Malta by Bishop Garagallo.
- November 17 – Sigismund III Vasa becomes the new King of Sweden upon the death of his father, King John III.
- December 4 – Yu Sŏngnyong becomes the new Yeonguijeong (Chief State Councillor of the government of the Korean Empire, similar to Prime Minister) and serves until 1598.
- December 21 – The city of London begins publishing the Bill of Mortality, the first regular data of deaths from an epidemic, as the government reports its weekly survey of the number of burials in the 113 parishes of London of deaths from bubonic plague. The death statistics continue to be published until December 18, 1595.

==== Date unknown ====
- William Cecil, 1st Baron Burghley, chief adviser of Queen Elizabeth I of England, is taken seriously ill.
- Negotiations begin for the annulment of the childless marriage of Henry IV of France and Marguerite of Valois.
- The Confucian shrine of Munmyo in Korea is destroyed by fire.
- The Population Census Edict is promulgated in Japan by Toyotomi Hidetsugu.
- Henry Constable's Diana, one of the first sonnet sequences in English, is published in London.

=== 1593 ===
==== January–March ====
- January 25 – Siamese King Naresuan, in combat on elephant back, kills Burmese Crown Prince Mingyi Swa on Monday, Moon 2 Waning day 2, Year of the Dragon, Chulasakarat 954, reckoned as corresponding to January 25, 1593, of the Gregorian calendar, and commemorated as Royal Thai Armed Forces Day.
- January 27 – The Roman Inquisition opens the seven-year trial of scholar Giordano Bruno.
- February 2 – Battle of Piątek: Polish forces led by Janusz Ostrogski are victorious.
- February 8 – Siege of Pyongyang (1593): A Japanese invasion is defeated in Pyongyang by a combined force of Korean and Ming troops.
- February 12 – Battle of Haengju: Korea defeats Japan.
- March 7 (February 25 Old Style) – The Uppsala Synod discontinues; the Liturgical Struggle between the Swedish Reformation and Counter-Reformation ends in Sweden.
- March 14 – The Pi Day, giving the most digits of pi when written in mm/dd/yyyy format, (i.e. 3.141593, 3/14/1593) occurs, as realized later. During 1593 Flemish mathematician Adriaan van Roomen is working on the most accurate calculation of pi up to that time and arrives at 16 decimal places of pi using the polygon approximation method), and publishes it in his treatise Ideae mathematicae pars prima (Antverpiae, 1593).

==== April–June ====
- April 10 – The English Parliament enacts a law for the first military disability pension in British history, titled "An Acte for relief of Soudiours". The Act states that "forasmuch as it is agreeable with Christian Charity Policy and the Honour of our Nation, that such as have since the 25th day of March 1588, adventured their lives and lost their limbs or disabled their bodies, or shall hereafter adventure the lives, lose their limbs or disable their bodies, in defence and service of Her Majesty and the State, should at their return be relieved and rewarded to the end that they may reap the fruit of their good deservings, and others may be encouraged to perform like endeavors..."
- April 18 – Anglo-Spanish War: Naval Battle of Blaye in the Gironde estuary sees a Spanish victory over the blockading English fleet, allowing the Spanish to relieve the French Catholic garrison of Blaye.
- After April – William Shakespeare's poem Venus and Adonis probably becomes his first published work, printed in London from his own manuscript. In his lifetime it will be his most frequently reprinted work: at least nine times.
- May 5 – "Dutch church libel" bills posted in London threaten Protestant refugees from France and the Netherlands, alluding to Christopher Marlowe's plays.
- May 12 – English dramatist Thomas Kyd is arrested over the "Dutch church libel". "Atheist" literature found in his home is claimed to be Marlowe's.
- May 18 – A warrant for the arrest of Christopher Marlowe is issued. On May 20 he presents himself to the Privy Council.
- May 30 – Christopher Marlowe is stabbed to death in a dispute over a bill at a lodging house in Deptford.
- June 7 – Battle of Salbertrand in Piedmont: Victory of François de Bonne, Duke of Lesdiguières, over the Spanish of Rodrigue Alvarez of Toledo, allies of Charles Emmanuel I, Duke of Savoy.
- June 22 – Battle of Sisak in Croatia: The Habsburgs defeat the Ottoman Empire.

==== July–September ====
- July 25 – As he promised in January, Henry IV of France abjures Protestantism at the Basilica of Saint-Denis. Legend attributes to him the saying Paris vaut bien une messe ("Paris is well worth a mass").
- July 29 – The Long War breaks out in Hungary between the Habsburgs and the Ottomans.
- August 3 – Poland's council of nobles, the Sejm, grants permission to King Sigismund III Vasa and his wife, Queen consort Anne, to travel to Sweden to claim the Swedish crown.
- August 24 – After losing the Battle of Sisak two months earlier, the Ottoman Empire attacks the Austrian fortress guarding the city and breaks through its walls with cannon fire, forcing its surrender on August 30.
- September 10 – With no fortress or troops to defend Croatia, Ottoman General Mehmed Pasha captures the city of Sisak. Selânikî Mustafa Efendi, Tarih-i Selânikî (Türk Tarih Kurumu, 1999)

==== October–December ====
- October 11 – The Battle of Belleek takes place at County Fermanagh in Ireland as an English expeditionary force led by Henry Bagenal defeats Irish troops commanded by the Lord of Fermanagh.
- October 24 – Supposed date of the event described in the 1593 transported soldier legend.
- October 28 – The Siege of Coevorden begins as the Spanish Army attempts to retake a fortress captured a year earlier by the Dutch Republic and the Kingdom of England.
- November 27 – Antonio Grimaldi Cebà begins a two-year term as the new Doge of the Republic of Genoa, succeeding Giovanni Giustiniani Campi.
- December 6 – The Battle of Dryfe Sands takes place in Scotland at Annandale, between rival clans as John Maxwell leads Clan Maxwell, aided by Clan Grierson and Clan Pollock, in an invasion of the lands of Clan Johnstone, led by Sir James Johnstone. With their defense aided by Clan Scott and Clan Graham, the Johnstone clan wins the battle, but only 160 of the 600 defenders survive the fight.
- December 27 – Spanish Jesuit priest Gregorio Céspedes becomes the first Christian missionary to Korea, arriving at Busan to begin his ministry in the Buddhist kingdom of Joseon. Céspedes is able to enter Korea by coming with the Japanese invasion force of General Toyotomi Hideyoshi.

==== Date unknown ====
- Mihai Viteazul becomes prince of Walachia.
- Robert Bellarmine's Disputationes de Controversiis Christianae Fidei adversus hujus temporis Haereticos concludes publication in Ingolstadt.
- Henry Constable's Spirituall Sonnettes are written.
- The parish of Laukaa was founded.
- Khwaja Usman takes shelter in Goyghor Mosque after the Afghan rebellion against the Subahdar of Mughal Bengal, Man Singh I.
- Irish pirate queen Grace O'Malley meets with Queen Elizabeth I of England at Greenwich.
- c. 1593–1604 – According to John Warwick Montgomery, the Rosicrucian manifestos are initially composed by Tobias Hess, in anticipation of the opening of the vault in 1604, according to Simon Studion's apocalyptic timetable.

=== 1594 ===
==== January–March ====
- January 3 – Longvek, the capital of the Kingdom of Cambodia, is conquered by the army of the Ayutthaya Kingdom (now Thailand), commanded by King Naresuan, after more than two years of war. King Chey Chettha I of Cambodia is able to flee to Laos, along with the former King Satha I, but the rest of the royal family is taken hostage, along with Prince Srei Soriyopear.
- January 17 – Construction of the Junagarh Fort in the Mughal Empire's principality of Bikaner (now in India's Rajasthan state) is completed after almost five years.
- January 24 – William Shakespeare's play Titus Andronicus, is given its first performance, presented by the Admiral's Men company of players at The Rose in London.
- January 25 – The siege of Enniskillen Castle in Ireland (at County Fermanagh) is started by English commander John Dowdall, but is abandoned after one month.
- February 2 – England's Admiral Richard Hawkins and the crew of the ship HMS Dainty become the first Europeans to see the Falkland Islands.
- February 19 – The coronation of Sigismund III Vasa as King of Sweden takes place at Uppsala.
- February 27 – The coronation of Henry IV as King of France takes place at Chartres Cathedral.
- March 18 – Two warships of the English Navy, commanded by Captain James Langton, complete a three-day raid on the Spanish city of Puerto de Caballos (now Puerto Cortés in Guatemala) and pillage the city.

==== April–June ====
- April 17 – Hyacinth of Poland is canonized by Pope Clement VIII.
- April 27 – After suppressing the Serbian uprising in Banat, the Ottoman Empire rulers carry out the public burning of the bones of Saint Sava in Belgrade.
- May 6 – The siege of the Spanish-held city of Coevorden ends after six months as the city surrenders to the Dutch Republic.
- May 14 – After almost two years of being closed because of bubonic plague, theaters in England are allowed to reopen, as the Admiral's Men stage a performance of The Jew of Malta.
- May 19 – The Siege of Groningen by the Dutch Republic begins with an attack of 10,000 soldiers against the Spanish-held city. The Spanish commander surrenders after two months on July 22.
- June 5 – Willem Barents makes his first voyage to the Arctic Ocean, in search of the Northeast Passage.
- June 11 – Philip II of Spain recognizes the rights and privileges of the local nobles and chieftains in the Philippines, which paves the way for the stabilization of the rule of the Principalía.
- June 23 – A cargo ship explosion kills over 700 people the day after three English Navy ships— the Mayflower, Sampson and Royal Exchange— set fire to the Portuguese carrack Cinco Chagas off of the coast of Faial Island during the Anglo-Spanish War. The treasure inside, gathered from the East Indies, sinks in the north Atlantic Ocean. Only 13 people on the Cinco Chagas survive, and the cargo is lost.

==== July–September ====
- July 1 – Anglo-Spanish War: Action of Atacames Bay – English privateer Richard Hawkins in the Dainty is attacked and captured by a Spanish squadron off Esmeraldas (now in Ecuador).
- July 3 – The Ayutthayan–Cambodian War (1591–1594) concludes when Naresuan, ruler of the Ayutthaya Kingdom, sacks Longvek, capital of Cambodia.
- July 22 – After a two-month siege, the city of Groningen submits to Dutch troops, bringing the whole northern Netherlands under the Dutch Republic.
- August 25 – San Luis, in the Viceroyalty of Peru (now in Argentina), is founded by Luis Jufré de Loaysa y Meneses.
- August 28 – Farkas Kovacsóczy, who has served as Chancellor of Transylvania for 16 years, is arrested on orders of Prince Sigismund Báthory, and István Jósika is appointed in his place. Kovacsóczy is imprisoned at Szamosújvár (now Gherla in Romania) and executed by strangulation on September 11.
- August 30 – Diplomats meet at Stirling Castle for the Masque at the baptism of Prince Henry, heir to the throne of Scotland.
- September 6 – In France, Morlaix, a walled city in Brittany controlled by the Spanish Army and the Ligue catholique, is besieged by the French Royal Army led by Marshal Jean VI d'Aumont. The French Army is supplemented by 2,000 troops commanded by John Norreys.
- September 17 – A fleet of six ships, commanded by the privateer Martin Frobisher, arrives at Morlaix and prepares to bombard the city, under siege by the French Army. The Spanish Army commander of the Morlaix garrison surrenders, rather than facing the city's destruction.

==== October–December ====
- October 1 – The siege of Fort Crozon begins as an English and French army attacks the Spanish held fortress at the Pointe des Espagnols in France.
- October 3 – The Battle of Glenlivet is fought in Scotland between the Protestant forces loyal to King James VI, assisted by the armies of 8 clans and led by the Earl of Argyll, against Roman Catholic rebels supported by Clan Gordon (led by the Earl of Huntley), Clan Hay (led by the Earl of Errol), Clan Comyn and Clan Cameron. Despite being outnumbered 5 to 1, the Catholic clans win the battle, killing 500 of the Protestant forces.
- October 9 – The Campaign of Danture, which began on July 5 as part of the Sinhalese–Portuguese War, concludes with a decisive victory by forces of the Kingdom of Kandy over the Portuguese Empire, reversing near-total control of Sri Lanka by Portugal. Pedro Lopes de Sousa, the Governor of Portuguese Ceylon, is killed in the battle and replaced on December 24 by Jerónimo de Azevedo.
- November 13 – After the Principality of Wallachia (now in Romania) joins other Eastern European nations in a Holy League, a rebellion breaks out in Bucharest as Christian residents massacre the soldiers of the Ottoman Muslim garrison, entering Wallachia into the ongoing Thirteen Years' War.
- November 18 – The Spanish fortress at Château de Brest in France falls after a siege of five months.
- November 19 – The siege of Fort Crozon by English and French soldiers ends with a massacre of all but 13 of the nearly 400 Spaniards living there, including women and children.
- December 2 – The proposal for the Union of Brest (moving the Metropolitan of Kiev, Galicia and all Rus from the ecclesiastical jurisdiction of the Eastern Orthodox Church to the Roman Catholic Church) is made in a petition by the Metropolitan Michael Rohoza in a petition to Sigismund, monarch of Poland, Lithuania, Sweden and Finland. After a similar petition to Pope Clement VIII on June 12, 1595, the Union will be proclaimed on October 8, 1596.
- December 15 – King Udai Singh of Marwar (now the Rajasthan and Punjab states of India and the Punjab province of Pakistan) returns to Lahore after having captured the Siwana fort.
- December 27 – French university student Jean Châtel attempts to assassinate King Henry IV of France after gaining entrance into the King's office. Châtel attacks the monarch with a knife and causes a minor injury. After the court jester, Mathurine de Vallois intervenes, she detains Châtel until the King's bodyguard can carry out the arrest. Two days later, is executed by dismemberment. The Collège de Clermont, the Jesuit institution where Châtel was a student, is closed and the order of the Jesuits is temporarily banned.
- December 28 – The earliest known performance of William Shakespeare's play The Comedy of Errors takes place at Gray's Inn in London, and is played by the Lord Chamberlain's Men acting company. The production is held before members of the English court on Innocents' Day as part of the Gray's Inn Christmas festivities.

==== Date unknown ====
- St. Paul's College is founded in Macau by Jesuits, being the first western style university in the far east.
- In Amsterdam, the Compagnie van Verre is created, with the goal of breaking the Portuguese monopoly on spice trade.
- Tulip bulbs planted by Carolus Clusius in the Hortus Botanicus Leiden, Holland, flower for the first time.
- The city of Pompeii is rediscovered more than 1,500 years after its burial by the eruption of Mount Vesuvius.

=== 1595 ===
==== January–March ====
- January 16 – Mehmed III succeeds Murad III, as Sultan of the Ottoman Empire and begins a reign of almost nine years. Upon ascending the throne, Mehmed orders that all 19 of the other sons of Murad III are to be strangled to death.
- January 17 – During the French Wars of Religion, King Henry IV of France declares war on Spain, ordering Henry, Duke of Bouillon to lead armies through Luxembourg for an attack on the Spanish Netherlands (now Belgium).
- January 24 – Matthias of Habsburg is appointed by his brother Rudolf II, Holy Roman Emperor, to become the Archduke of die Vorlande, the possessions of the Austrian Habsburgs in Southern Germany outside of Austria, also called Further Austria (Vorderösterreich). The appointment follows the death of their uncle, Ferdinand II. Matthias will later become Archduke of Austria (in 1608) and the Emperor in 1612.
- January 28 – The Principality of Transylvania (now encompassing most of Romania) joins the Holy League alliance with the Holy Roman Empire in a war against the Ottoman Empire, as Stephen Bocskai signs a treaty at Prague on behalf of Prince Sigismund Báthory.
- February 6
  - Sir Walter Raleigh of England departs from Plymouth to begin an expedition to South America
  - Despite a string of military victories over the Serbian rebels, Koca Sinan Pasha is dismissed as Grand Vizier of the Ottoman Empire by Sultan Mehmed III, and banished to Malkara. He is replaced by Serdar Ferhad Pasha, whom he replaces on July 7.
- February 16 – In northern Ireland, Art MacBaron O'Neill successfully conducts the assault on the Blackwater Fort, an English military outpost located in County Armagh and captures it.
- February 20 – Archduke Ernest of Austria, Governor-General of the Habsburg Netherlands (now Belgium), dies at the age of 41 and is temporarily replaced by his Spanish assistant, Pedro Henriquez de Acevedo, Count of Fuentes.
- February 25 – The Goa state archives are established at the city of Panaji in Portuguese India (now India's Goa state) by historian Diogo do Couto.
- March 20 – After a siege of 13 days, the French town of Huy (now in Belgium) is captured by the army of the Spanish Netherlands, as the General Charles de Héraugière surrenders to the Baron de la Motte.
- March 26 – Thado Dhamma Yaza III, who has served since 1589 for the Kingdom of Pegu as the Burmese Viceroy of Prome (now in the Bago Region of Myanmar), declares himself to be the King of Prome during the invasion by the Kingdom of Siam and breaks relations with his father King Nanda Bayin of Pegu.

==== April–June ====
- April 8 (March 29 O.S.) – Combined Taungoo–Lan Na armies break the rebel Thado Dhamma Yaza's siege of Taungoo, in modern-day Myanmar.
- April 15 – Sir Walter Raleigh travels up the Orinoco River, in search of the fabled city of El Dorado.
- May 18 – The Treaty of Teusina brings to an end the Russo-Swedish War (1590–95).
- May 24 – The Nomenclator of Leiden University Library appears, the first printed catalog of an institutional library.
- May 29 – George Somers and Amyas Preston travel to aid Raleigh's El Dorado expedition but failing to meet him instead raid the Spanish Province of Venezuela
- June 9 – Battle of Fontaine-Française: Henry IV of France defeats the Spanish, but is nearly killed due to his rashness.

==== July–September ====
- July 21 – A Spanish expedition of four ships, led by navigator and explorer Álvaro de Mendaña de Neira, makes the first European landing in Polynesia, on the Marquesas Islands. Despite an initially good reception with the natives, fighting begins and the Mendaña ships leave after two weeks. One of the ships, the Santa Ysabel, disappears during the voyage toward the Solomon Islands.
- July 23 – The Spanish raid Cornwall, England.
- August 23 – Battle of Calugareni: The Wallachians, led by Michael the Brave, accomplish a great tactical victory against a vast army of Turks, led by Sinan Pasha.
- August 28 – Sir Francis Drake and Sir John Hawkins depart from England, on their final voyage to the Spanish Main, which ends in both of their deaths.
- September 2 – Battle of the Lippe (Eighty Years' War): Spanish cavalry, led by Cristóbal de Mondragón (aged over 80), defeat combined forces of the Dutch Republic and England led by Philip of Nassau (who dies of wounds received), on the banks of the river Lippe in Germany.
- September 8 – The first European colony in the South Seas is established as Spanish explorer Álvaro de Mendaña claims Nendö Island (one of the Solomon Islands) and claims it for Spain as the colony of Santa Cruz. Malaria, a mutiny of some of the Spanish soldiers, and a fight with the indigenous people kills 47 of the settlers, including Mendaña on October 18.

==== October–December ====
- October 26 – Battle of Giurgiu: Michael the Brave, led by Transylvanian Prince Sigismund Báthory, again defeats the Turkish army led by Sinan Pasha, pushing them on the east side of the Danube.
- October 30 – The surviving members of Spain's Mendaña expedition to Santa Cruz, including Mendaña's widow Isabel Barreto, decide to abandon the Santa Cruz colony in the South Pacific.
- November 7 – Portuguese explorer Sebastião Rodrigues Soromenho, who had departed from the Philippines on the ship San Agustin on July 5 with cargo of Asian silk, porcelain, and almost 100 passengers and crew, drops anchor at Drakes Bay in what is now the U.S. state of California. He and some of his crew come ashore, where they are greeted by Native Americans. A gale in a few weeks later sinks the San Agustin, killing at least 7 people and ruining the ship's cargo. The crew salvages a launch that they had brought with them.
- November 8 – The Battle of Guadalupe Island is fought between nine English Navy warships (led by Sir Francis Drake) and eight Spanish frigates off in the North Atlantic Ocean. The Spanish force wins the battle, capturing one ship and killing 45 English sailors. Both sets of ships proceed toward Puerto Rico.
- November 9 – In India, Prince Man Singh I, Maharaja of Amber within the Mughal Empire, becomes the Mughal Governor (subahdar) of Bengal in what is now Bangladesh and the Indian state of West Bengal. He lays the foundations of a new capital of Bengal, Akbarnagar (now Rajmahal, Jharkhand state).
- November 17 – In the remodeling of the Church of Saint Sylvester in Rome, the ashes of Pope Anterus are discovered almost 1,360 years after his death. Anterus had served as Pope for six weeks before dying on January 3, 236.
- November 18 – The settlers of the first attempt to create a European colony in the South Pacific depart from Santa Cruz Island on three surviving ships, the San Geronimo, the San Felipe and the Santa Catalina (which disappears during the attempt to return home). Despite the lack of navigation charts, navigator Pedro Fernandes de Queirós brings the San Geronimo and the San Felipe back to Manila Bay, arriving on February 11 after 12 weeks and the deaths of 50 passengers.
- November 22 – The Battle of San Juan is fought off of the island of Puerto Rico as an English fleet of 27 ships and 2,500 men, led by Francis Drake, attempts to invade the Spanish colony. In a three-day battle, the English lose at least eight ships and 400 men, including Admiral John Hawkins. Drake's fleet withdraws and attempts to conquer Panama.
- December 8 – A group of 80 people from the sunken ship San Agustin, are able to leave California on the launch which they had brought along, which they name the San Buenaventura. The group sails past San Francisco Bay and arrives at Chacala in Mexico on January 17.
- December 9 – What is probably the first performance of William Shakespeare's play, Richard II, takes place in London.
- December 14 – Sultan Murad, 4th son of Emperor Akbar of the Mughal Empire invades Ahmednagar Sultanate which is defended by Chand Bibi.

==== Date unknown ====
- The Austrians incite a rebellion against the Ottomans in Bulgaria.
- The Riksdag of the Estates at Söderköping in Sweden elects the Lutheran Duke Charles as the country's regent, in place of Sigismund III Vasa, King of Poland and Sweden.
- Probable first performance of William Shakespeare's plays Romeo and Juliet and A Midsummer Night's Dream in London.
- Many sugar plantations in São Tomé are destroyed by a large slave uprising

=== 1596 ===
==== January–March ====
- January 6 – Drake's Assault on Panama: Sir Francis Drake, General Thomas Baskerville and an English force of 15 ships land at the Atlantic Ocean port of Nombre de Dios in an attempt to capture the Isthmus of Panama.
- January 20 – Francis Drake, unable to receive a ransom for the town of Nombre de Dios, orders the town and all Spanish ships in harbor to be burned. At the same time, General Baskerville leads 750 men on a mission to clear the Isthmus of Spanish parties.
- January 27 – With an epidemic of dysentery spreading through the English forces of Drake and Baskerville, Drake orders survivors to retreat to the English ships, anchored off of the island of Escudo de Veraguas. Drake dies of dystentery two days later on his flagship, Defiance.
- February 11 – Albert of Austria arrives in Brussels to begin his administration as Governor General of the Habsburg Netherlands.
- February 14 – Archbishop John Whitgift begins building his hospital at Croydon.
- March 11 – The Battle of Pinos is fought between the English Navy (with 14 warships) and the Spanish Navy (with 13 galleons) off of the coast Cuba's Isla de Pinos, with 325 English Navy men killed or captured, while Spain drives Baskerville's ships to retreat and sustains 80 dead or wounded.
- March 15 – During Spain's Brittany Campaign during the Anglo-Spanish War, a Spanish ship carrying 25 soldiers invades England after arriving at Cawsand Bay in Cornwall. After starting a fire, the Spanish retreat.

==== April–June ====
- April 9 – Siege of Calais: Spanish troops capture Calais.
- May 18 – Willem Barents leaves Vlie, on his third and final Arctic voyage.
- June 5 – Pope Clement VIII appoints 16 new Cardinals.
- June 10 – Willem Barents and Jacob van Heemskerk discover Bear Island.
- June 17 – Willem Barents discovers Spitsbergen.
- June 24 – Cornelis de Houtman arrives in Banten, the first Dutch sailor to reach Indonesia.

==== July–September ====
- July 5 – Capture of Cádiz: An English fleet, commanded by Robert Devereux, 2nd Earl of Essex, and Lord Howard of Effingham, sacks Cádiz.
- July 14 – King Dominicus Corea (Edirille Bandara) is beheaded by the Portuguese in Colombo, Ceylon.
- July 18 – Queen Elizabeth I of England issues "an open warrant to the Lord Mayor of London and the aldermen and his brethren, and to all other vice-admirals, mayors, and other public officers whatsoever to whom it may appertain" directing that Africans in the realm will be deported. Citing a request from Casper van Senden "to have licence to take up so many blackamoors here in this realm and to transport them into Spain and Portugal," the Queen notes that "Her majesty... considering the reasonableness of his request to transport so many blackamoors from hence, doth think it a very good exchange and that those kind of people may be well spared in this realm being so populous and numbers of able persons the subjects of the land and Christian people that perish for want of service, whereby through their labor they might be maintained."
- August 18 – The siege of the Dutch city of Hulst is completed after a month as Spanish forces under the command of Albert, son of the late Holy Roman Emperor Maxmimilan II, force the surrender of the city.
- August 29 – The coronation of Christian IV as King of Denmark and King of Norway takes place at the Vor Frue Kirke cathedral in Copenhagen. The Bishop of Zealand, Peder Virstrup, places the crown upon the head of King Christian IV, who had become the monarch in 1588 at the age of 11.
- August – David Fabricius discovers the variable nature of the star Mira.
- September 20 – Diego de Montemayor founds the city of Monterrey, Mexico.

==== October–December ====
- October 10 – The Union of Brest: The Ukrainian Church west of the Dnieper becomes known as the Ukrainian Rite of Catholicism, whereas the East officially renounces the authority of the Pope.
- October 18 – The Second Armada, a Spanish fleet sent to attack England in revenge for the raid on Cadiz, is wrecked in storms off Cape Finisterre; nearly 5,000 men and 44 ships are lost including five galleons
- October 19 – The Spanish galleon San Felipe founders in Japan, leading to 26 Christians being martyred the next year.
- October 26 – Battle of Keresztes: The Ottoman Empire Turks defeat a combined Habsburg–Transylvanian army, after two days of fighting: .
- November 25 – The Cudgel War begins in Finland (at the time part of Sweden), when poor peasants rise up against the troops, nobles and cavalry who have taxed them.
- December 5 – Damat Ibrahim Pasha is appointed the Grand Vizier of the Ottoman Empire by Sultan Mehmed III for the second time in less than a year, replacing Cigalazade Yusuf Sinan Pasha, who succeeded him on October 27.
- December 8 – In Japan, Toyotomi Hideyoshi, Chancellor of the Realm, orders the arrest of the 26 Roman Catholic Christians who had the misfortune of being shipwrecked in Kyoto on October 19; each of the ones arrested has a part of the left ear cut off, then sent on a forced march to Nagasaki on January 4, then has them killed on February 5.
- December 31 – King Henry IV of France (who was originally King Henry III of the Spanish Navarre) declares Navarre to be permanently separate of France.

==== Date unknown ====
- The first water closet, by Sir John Harington, is installed in a manor near Kelston in England.
- King Sigismund III Vasa moves the capital of Poland from Kraków to Warsaw.
- Sidney Sussex College, Cambridge, is founded.
- The Black Death hits parts of Europe.
- The fourth of a five year run of poor harvests, largely caused by the weather, a pattern typical of the last third of the century. This causes famine throughout Europe, which leads to food riots in Britain.
- The Serb Uprising of 1596–97 begins.

=== 1597 ===
==== January–March ====
- January 4 – Japan's Chancellor of the Realm, Toyotomi Hideyoshi, sends 26 European Christians, arrested on December 8, 1596, on a forced march from Kyoto to Nagasaki.
- January 24 – Battle of Turnhout: Maurice of Nassau defeats a Spanish force under Jean de Rie of Varas, in the Netherlands.
- February 5 – In Japan, 26 European Catholic Christians are executed in Nagasaki by crucifixion. They had the misfortune of being shipwrecked on the Japanese coast on October 19, 1596.
- February 8 – Sir Anthony Shirley, England's "best-educated pirate", raids Jamaica.
- February 24 – The last battle of the Cudgel War is fought on the Santavuori Hill in Ilmajoki, Ostrobothnia.
- March 11 – Amiens is taken by Spanish forces.

==== April–June ====
- April 10 – The Serb uprising of 1596–97 ends in defeat for the rebels, at the field of Gacko (Gatačko Polje).
- April 19 – Prince Nyaungyan Min ignores the orders of King Nanda Bayin of Burma and seizes control of the Kingdom of Ava (now in Upper Myanmar)
- April 23 – Probable first performance of William Shakespeare's The Merry Wives of Windsor.
- April 27 – Johannes Kepler marries Barbara Muhleck.
- May 13 – King Henry IV of France and England's General Thomas Baskerville begin the siege of the city of Amiens in France, which had been captured on March 11 by the Spanish Army. The city is recaptured by September 25.
- May 27 – The Kingdom of Kotte, on most of the western side of the island of Sri Lanka, upon the death of King Dharmapala. With no heirs, Dharmapala had made a will bequeathing the entire kingdom to the European nation of Portugal, creating the territory of Portuguese Ceylon (Puruthugisi Lankawa or Porthueka Ilankai).
- June 13 – The Staten-Generaal of the Dutch Republic approves a proposal for the Generaliteitscollege, a common board for the Republic's five separate navies, the Admiralty of Amsterdam, the Admiralty of Rotterdam, the Admiralty of Zeeland, the Admiralty of the Noorderkwartier and the Admiralty of Friesland.

==== July–September ====
- July 14 – Scottish poet Alexander Montgomerie is declared an outlaw, after the collapse of a Catholic plot.
- July 28 – After the performance of the satirical play The Isle of Dogs, written by Thomas Nashe and Ben Jonson, at the Swan Theatre, the Privy Council of England concludes that the "lewd play" is full of seditious and slanderous matter. Jonson is arrested, along with two actors, Gabriel Spenser and Robert Shaa, and the three are sent to Marshalsea Prison. A raid on the home of Thomas Nashe seizes his papers, but Nashe is not found. The three prisoners are released later in the year and return to the stage. All copies of The Isle of Dogs script are destroyed.
- August 13 – The Siege of Namwon begins in Korea.
- August 14 – First Dutch Expedition to Indonesia: A Dutch expedition commanded by Cornelis de Houtman returns to Amsterdam, after having successfully reached Java. This achievement opens the Spice trade, which had until then been monopolised by the Portuguese, to the Dutch, who in the next years launch several more expeditions to the Indies.
- August 17 – Islands Voyage: Robert Devereux, 2nd Earl of Essex, and Sir Walter Raleigh set sail on an expedition to the Azores.
- August 19 – Rheinberg capitulates to forces led by Maurice of Naussau.
- August 24 – Christian IV of Denmark-Norway refuses to let Tycho Brahe return to Denmark.
- August 28 – Imjin War: Battle of Chilcheollyang – The Japanese fleet defeats the Koreans, in their only naval victory of the war.
- September 25 – Amiens is retaken from the Spanish by Anglo-French forces, led by Henry IV of France, after a four-month siege.

==== October–December ====
- October 18 – The 3rd Spanish Armada, a fleet of 140 ships, departs from the port of La Coruña with 12,634 soldiers and sailors and a plan to invade the British Isles with a landing at Falmouth in Cornwall.
- October 21 – The Spanish Armada reaches the English Channel without opposition. An English ship sees the invading force's approach, but is intercepted and sunk, with the survivors being taken prisoner. The Armada encounters a storm the next day.
- October 25 – Following the loss of an artillery ship and the galleon San Bartolome, Spanish Admiral Diego Brochero orders the remaining ships in the attacking Armada to disperse until the weather improves.
- October 26 – Battle of Myeongnyang: The Koreans, commanded by Yi Sunsin, are victorious over a Japanese invasion fleet.
- November 10 – In the last major action during the war of the 3rd Spanish Armada, the galleon Bear of Amsterdam is captured as it approaches Falmouth, where an English squadron intercepts it and leads it into Dartmouth.
- November 12 – Lingen capitulates to forces led by Maurice of Nassau.
- November 21 – The remainder of the 3rd Spanish Armada is assembled at La Coruña. Only 108 of the original fleet of 140 ships is left, and many of the vessels require food and supplies. King Philip elects not to attempt another invasion of the British Isles.
- December 6 – Queen Elizabeth of England appoints George Nicholson as the English Resident in Scotland, the London's chief diplomatic official to Edinburgh, with a letter of accreditation for Nicholson to present to King James VI of Scotland.
- December 7 – Lazzaro Grimaldi Cebà is elected as the new Doge of the Republic of Genoa, as the previous chief executive, Matteo Senarega completes his two-year term. Senarega is given the post of procuratore perpetuo.
- December 23
  - The Roman Catholic order of the Congregatio Patrum Doctrinae Christianae, which will later be more commonly known as the Christian Doctrine Fathers, is approved by Pope Clement VIII. Founded on September 29, 1592, the order continues to operate more than four centuries later and is headquartered in Rome.
  - Prince Sigismund Báthory signs an agreement with Rudolf II, Holy Roman Emperor to abdicate the throne of Transylvania in return for the Silesian duchies of Racibórz and Opole and an annual subsidy of 50,000 thalers.

==== Date unknown ====
- Abbas I ends the Uzbek raids on his lands.
- Yaqob succeeds his father Sarsa Dengel, as Emperor of Ethiopia at the age of 7.
- Jacopo Peri writes Dafne, now recognised as the first opera.
- The first edition of Francis Bacon's Essays is published.
- Andreas Libavius publishes Alchemia, a pioneering chemistry textbook.
- 12 million pesos of silver cross the Pacific. Although it is unknown just how much silver flowed from the Spanish base of Manila in the Philippines to the Ming Dynasty of China, it is known that the main port for the Mexican silver trade—Acapulco—shipped out 150,000 to 345,000 kg (4 to 9 million taels) of silver annually from this year to 1602.
- Tobias Hess corresponds with Simon Studion and agrees with him that the Papacy must fall in 1604.

=== 1598 ===
==== January–March ====
- January 8 – In Berlin, Joachim Frederich of the House of Hohenzollern becomes the new Elector of Brandenburg upon the death of his father, Johann Georg von Brandenburg.
- January 17 – The Tsar of the Russian Empire, Feodor I, dies of a sudden illness at the age of 40, leaving no children and bringing an end to the Rurik dynasty. His widow, Irina Godunova, takes action to secure the throne but her rule lasts for only nine days.
- January 26 – After receiving no support from the Russian nobles, the Tsaritsa Irina Godunova abandons her brief rule as autocrat of Russia, and abdicates in favor of her older brother, Boris Godunov.
- January 29 – In what is now South Korea, a force of 50,000 troops of the Korean kingdom of Joseon and Chinese Ming dynasty troops begins the siege of Ulsan, a Japanese-controlled castle located in the southwest port of Ulsan on the Sea of Japan.
- January 30 – In Italy Cesare d'Este moves the capital of the Duchy of Modena and Reggio to the city of Modena, after the Duchy of Ferrara is declared by Pope Clement VIII to be at an end.
- February 21 – Boris Godunov is elected as the Tsar of Russia by unanimous vote of the parliament of nobles, the Zemsky Sobor.
- March 19 – Count Adolf von Schwarzenberg of Austria captures the Turkish fortress at Győr, four years after Turkish forces had taken it over.
- March 20 – The Duchy of Brittany in France is conquered by King Henry IV, who forces the surrender of Philippe Louis de Lorraine-Mercœur, Duke of Brittany. Merceur is then exiled to Hungary.
- March 23 – The abdication of Sigismund Báthory as Prince of Transylvania (now part of Romania) is accepted by the Transylvanian nobles. Sigismund's cousin, Andrew Báthory, is then elected as the new Prince.

==== April–June ====
- April 13 – Edict of Nantes (promulgated April 30): Henry IV of France grants French Huguenots equal rights with Catholics; this is considered the end of the French Wars of Religion.
- April 30 – In Mexico, on the day of the Feast of the Ascension, Juan de Oñate, dispatched by the Viceroy of New Spain to expand the Spanish colony's territory, assembles his group on the south side of the Rio Grande and formally claims all territory north of the river (near what is now the U.S. city of El Paso, Texas) as a colony of the Spanish Empire.
- May 2 – The Peace of Vervins, mediated by Cardinal Alessandro de Medici, ends the war between France and Spain.
- May 6 – King Philip II of Spain announces that his eldest daughter, Isabella Clara Eugenia, will marry Albert of Austria (at the time a Roman Catholic cardinal and Archbishop of Toledo), and that the two will jointly govern the Habsburg Netherlands (now Belgium).
- May 13 (Keichō 3, 8th day of the 4th month) – The Mount Asama volcano on the Japanese island of Honshu erupts.
- May – Tycho Brahe's star catalogue Astronomiæ instauratæ mechanica, listing the positions of 1,004 stars, is published.
- June 9 – The Principality of Wallachia becomes a vassal state of the Austrian Habsburgs and the Holy Roman Empire, after Michael the Brave (Mihai Pătrașcu, with a regnal name of Michael II) signs an agreement at Prague with Rudolf II, Holy Roman Emperor to receive protection from the Ottoman Empire.
- June 15 – England invades the Caribbean island of Puerto Rico with a force of 20 ships and 1,700 men led by the Earl of Cumberland.
- June 27 – The ill-fated Dutch expedition of Jacques Mahu begins as his ship Hoop, along with the ships Liefde, Geloof, Trouwe and Blijde Boodschap, departs from Rotterdam.
- June 30 – England's forces capture the Castillo San Felipe del Morro, the Spanish fortress defending San Juan, after a 15-day battle. When an epidemic begins taking its toll on the English forces, the Earl of Cumberland decides to withdraw and departs in August.

==== July–September ====
- July 10 – John Barrose, a Burgundian fencer who has challenged all comers and killed several, is hanged for murder. Barrose's story is dramatized by playwright Ben Jonson in Every Man in His Humour.
- July 12 – After fording the Rio Grande near what are now the Mexican city of Juarez and the U.S. city of El Paso, Juan de Oñate proclaims the founding of the colony of Santa Fe de Nuevo Méjico (Santa Fe of New Mexico), with himself as the first Viceroy. Oñate establishes the first capital of the New Mexico viceroyalty at a new village, San Juan de los Caballeros, near the Pueblo Indian city of Ohkay Owingeh, now located in Rio Arriba County, New Mexico.
- July 13 – A marriage contract is signed as part of the treaty of Saint-Germain-en-Laye between King Henry IV of France and Charles III, Duke of Lorraine, providing for King Henry's niece, Catherine of Bourbon, to marry Duke Charles's son, Henry of Lorraine.
- July 22 – William Shakespeare registers the rights to his new play, The Merchant of Venice, in the Register of the Stationers Company, under the title The Marchaunt of Venyce or otherwise called The Jewe of Venyce.
- July 23 – Sigismund III Vasa, King of Poland and Grand Duke of Lithuania, departs from Gdańsk with 80 transports, several warships and exiled members of the Swedish parliament to invade Sweden. The troops land at Kalmar on July 31, and secure its surrender.
- July – Philosopher Tommaso Campanella moves from Naples to Calabria, where he will be involved in a revolt against the rule of the Spanish viceroy the following year.
- August 14 – Battle of the Yellow Ford in Ireland: Hugh O'Neill, Earl of Tyrone, gains victory over an English expeditionary force under Henry Bagenal, in the Nine Years' War against English rule.
- August 16 (Keichō 3, 15th day of the 7th month) – The Council of Five Elders, to serve in Japan as regents after the death of General Hideyoshi, is gathered at Fushimi on orders of Hideyoshi, and the members vow their allegiance to Hideyoshi's son, Hideyori.
- September 2 – The Mahu expedition from the Dutch Republic arrives at the Cape Verde Islands off of the coast of Africa, and many of the men become fatally ill, including Captain Jacques Mahu, who dies on September 23.
- September 5 (Keichō 3, 5th day of the 8th month) – With his own death imminent, General Toyotomi Hideyoshi of Japan issues an order directing the Council of Five Elders to bring their children to the Osaka Castle to join Hideyoshi's designated successor, his son Hideyori.
- September 10 – Prince Michael II of Wallachia begins the siege of Nicopolis (now Nikopol in Bulgaria).
- September 13 – Philip III becomes the new King of Spain upon the death of his father.
- September 17 – Second Dutch Expedition to Indonesia: Jacob Corneliszoon van Neck and three ships commanded by him are separated from the Dutch Republic fleet of Admiral Wybrand van Warwyck, and land on a Portuguese-charted island, Ilha do Cisne. Van Neck names the island Mauritius, after Maurice, Prince of Orange. Although Diogo Fernandes Pereira and sailors from Portugal had, in 1507, become the first Europeans to find Mauritius, van Neck's men apparently are the first to sight the dodo, a now extinct bird.
- September 18 (Keichō 3, 18th day of the 8th month) – General Toyotomi Hideyoshi, who united Japan and became the Chancellor of the Realm, dies after ruling 12 years. He is nominally succeeded by his 5-year-old son, Toyotomi Hideyori, with the regency exercised by the Council of Five Elders.
- September 25 – Battle of Stångebro at Linköping in Sweden: The Catholic King Sigismund of Sweden and Poland is defeated in his attempt to resume control of Sweden by the Protestant forces of his uncle, Charles. Sigismund is deposed shortly thereafter.

==== October–December ====
- October 19 – The Siege of Suncheon, an attempt by Korean and Chinese troops to capture the Japanese-occupied Suncheon Castle. An attempt to lure Japanese General Konishi Yukinaga into an ambush fails when a Korean Army cannon is fired too early and gives away the Korean plan.
- November 2 – Admiral Yi Sunsin of the Korean Navy attempts to bombard the Suncheon Castle, two days after the joint Chinese and Korean land assault is driven back. Korea and Japan lose 39 ships when a large number of the fleet gets stuck in the shallow waters at low tide and the vessels are attacked by the Japanese. Yi Sunsin calls off the siege the next day.
- November 10 (11th waxing of Tazaungmon 960 ME) – In what is now the Rakhine State of Myanmar, King Min Razagyi of Arakan and the rebel leader Minye Thihathu begin their assault on Pegu, the remaining portion of the Toungoo Empire in southern Burma.
- November 15 – Pope Clement VIII authorizes the marriage between Albert of Austria and Isabella Clara Eugenia of Spain. The two will be married on April 18.
- December 4 – In what is now part of the U.S. state of New Mexico, a dispute breaks out between the Keres people of the Acoma Pueblo (near what is now Albuquerque, New Mexico between the Keres Chief Zutacapan and the Spanish colonial envoy Juan de Zaldívar. After being refused food and shelter for himself and his 16 men, Zaldivar retaliates by pillaging Acoma, and Zutacapan orders a counterattack in which Zaldivar and 11 other men are killed. Spanish troops from the Santa Fe de New Mexico colony retaliate on January 22 by carrying out the Acoma Massacre of 800 people.
- December 16 (Keichō 3, 19th day of the 11th month, lunar calendar) – Battle of Noryang: An allied Korean and Chinese fleet under Korean Admiral Yi Sun-sin and Chinese Admiral Chen Lin defeats the Japanese navy, ending the Japanese invasions of Korea (1592–98).
- December 21 – Battle of Curalaba: The revolting Mapuche, led by cacique Pelantaro, inflict a major defeat on Spanish troops in southern Chile; all Spanish cities south of the Bío Bío River eventually fall victim to the Destruction of the Seven Cities by the Mapuches, and all conquest of Mapuche territories by Europeans practically ceases, until the later 19th century Occupation of Araucanía.
- December 29 – Pope Clement VIII refuses to allow dispensation for Henry of Lorraine, who is Catholic, to marry Catherine of Bourbon, a Protestant Calvinist. King Henry IV of France then intimidates the Catholic Archbishop of Reims into authorizing the marriage.

==== Date unknown ====
- Carnival – Jacopo Peri's Dafne, the earliest known modern opera, is premièred at the Palazzo Corsini, Florence.
- Pentecost – Calvinist congregations in Zurich introduce music into their services.
- The Parliament of England passes the Vagabonds Act, that allows transportation of convicts to colonies.
- Illustrations of Ottoman Turkish and European riflemen, with detailed illustrations of their firearms, appear in Zhao Shizhen's book Shenqipu in this year, during the Ming Dynasty of China.
- The Spanish establish themselves in El Piñal, a trading port on the coast of China in the Pearl River Delta.

=== 1599 ===
==== January–March ====
- January 8 – The Jesuit educational plan, known as the Ratio Studiorum, is issued.
- January 22 – The Acoma Massacre begins in what is now northern New Mexico in the U.S., as Santa Fe de Nuevo Mexico viceroy Juan de Oñate leads 70 armed Spanish soldiers against the indigenous Keres people at Aak'u (the Acoma Pueblo) near what is now Albuquerque, New Mexico. In three days, 500 Acoma men and 300 women and children are killed by the Spanish.
- February 20 – On Shrove Tuesday, the earliest known performance of William Shakespeare's play As You Like It is given, presented at Richmond Park for Queen Elizabeth.
- February 21
  - At Southwark, near London on the south bank of the River Thames, the land upon which the Globe Theatre will be built is leased by Nicholas Brend to a team of investors led by William Shakespeare, Thomas Pope, actors Cuthbert and Richard Burbage, and three others.
  - Lorenzo Sauli becomes the new Doge of the Republic of Genoa, succeeding Lazzaro Grimaldi Cebà. Sauli will serve until 1601.
- March 12 – Robert Devereux, 2nd Earl of Essex, is appointed Lord Lieutenant of Ireland, by Queen Elizabeth I of England.

==== April–June ====
- April 23 – The Earl of Essex arrives in Dublin at the head of 16,000 troops, the largest army ever seen in Ireland.
- May 15 – Anglo-Spanish War (1585–1604): The Siege of Zaltbommel, located in the Dutch Republic, is begun by Spanish general Francisco López de Mendoza.
- May 16 – The Kalmar Bloodbath takes place in Kalmar, Sweden.
- May 29 – Essex takes Cahir Castle, supposedly the strongest in Ireland, after a short siege.
- June 1 – Bishops' Ban of 1599: The Archbishop of Canterbury, John Whitgift, and the Bishop of London, Richard Bancroft order a ban on a selection of literary works, including Microcynicon: Six Snarling Satires, by Thomas Middleton.
- June 20 – The Synod of Diamper is convened.

==== July–September ====
- July 17 – Second Dutch Expedition to East Indies: A Dutch fleet returns to Amsterdam from what is now Indonesia, carrying 600,000 pounds of pepper and 250,000 pounds of cloves and nutmeg.
- July 22 – The combined Dutch and English armies successfully defend Zaltbommel after a siege of two months.
- July 24 – Swedish King Sigismund III Vasa is dethroned by his uncle Duke Charles, who takes over as regent of the realm until 1604, when he becomes King Charles IX.
- August 15 – First Battle of Curlew Pass: Irish forces defeat the English.
- September 21 – The first reported performance at the Globe Theatre in London (erected over Spring/Summer), a presentation of Shakespeare's Julius Caesar (probably new to that year), is recorded by Swiss traveller Thomas Platter the Younger.
- September 28 – The Earl of Essex arrives back in England, disobeying the Queen's strict orders.

==== October–December ====
- October 18 – Battle of Sellenberk: Michael the Brave, Prince of Wallachia, defeats the army of Andrew Báthory near Șelimbăr, leading to the first recorded unification of the Romanians.
- November 10 – The Åbo Bloodbath takes place in Åbo (Turku), in modern-day Finland, which was part of Sweden at the time.
- November – Persian embassy to Europe (1599–1602): A diplomatic delegation from Safavid Persia, led by Hossein Ali Beg Bayat and his staff after being dispatched by the Shah Abbas the Great, arrives in Moscow as part of a mission to enlist European nations into an alliance against the Ottoman Empire. The Persians are accompanied by English adventurer Anthony Shirley, who had persuaded Shah Abbas to undertake the initiative.
- December 19 – The forces of Minye Thihathu II of Toungoo and his ally Min Razagyi of the Kingdom of Mrauk U end the First Toungoo Empire by capturing Pegu (modern-day Bago, Myanmar).

==== Date unknown ====
- The first Capuchin friar is entombed in the Catacombe dei Cappuccini in Palermo (Sicily).

== Births ==
1590

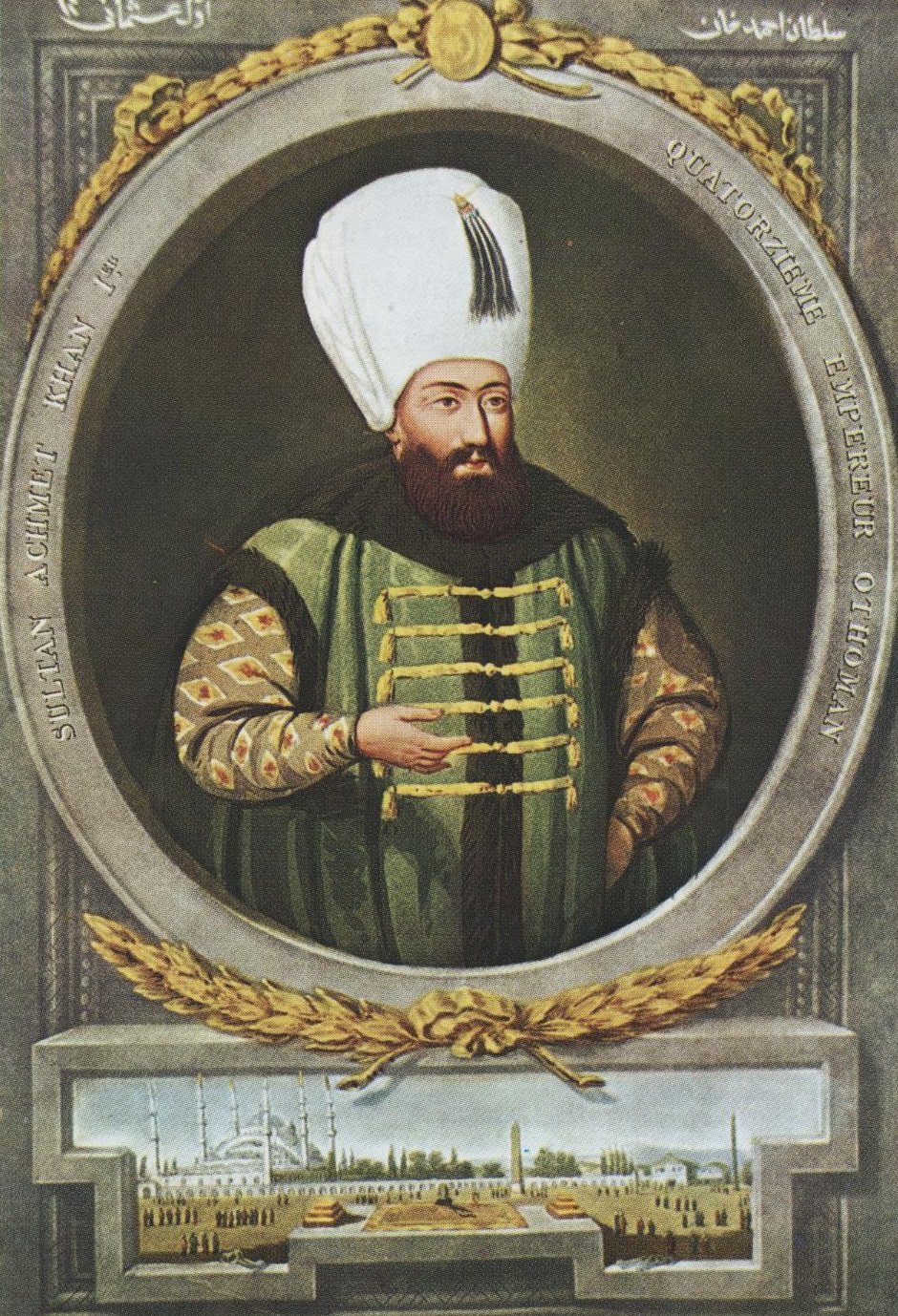
Emperor Ahmed I

- January 9 – Simon Vouet, French painter (d. 1649)
- January 13 – Arthur Bell, English Franciscan martyr (d. 1643)
- January 20
  - Edward Convers, American settler (d. 1663)
  - Benedetta Carlini, Italian mystic (d. 1661)
- January 27 – Charles Caesar, English politician and judge (d. 1642)
- January 30 – Lady Anne Clifford, 14th Baroness de Clifford (d. 1676)
- February 7 – Barthold Nihus, Roman Catholic priest (d. 1657)
- March – Roger Ludlow, one of the founders of the colony (later the state) of Connecticut (d. 1664)
- March 6 – Margaret of the Blessed Sacrament, French Discalced Carmelite nun (d. 1660)
- March 10 – Dietrich Reinkingk, German lawyer and politician (d. 1664)
- March 18 – Manuel de Faria e Sousa, Spanish and Portuguese historian and poet (d. 1649)
- March 29 – Michael Reyniersz Pauw, Dutch businessman (d. 1640)
- April 7
  - Louis de Dieu, Dutch theologian (d. 1642)
  - John Upton, English politician (d. 1641)
- April 18 – Ahmed I, Ottoman Sultan (d. 1617)
- May – William Cecil, 17th Baron de Ros (d. 1618)
- May 3 – Franco Burgersdijk, Dutch logician (d. 1635)
- May 5
  - John Albert II, Duke of Mecklenburg (d. 1636)
  - Jakub Sobieski, Polish noble (d. 1646)
- May 12 – Cosimo II de' Medici, Grand Duke of Tuscany (d. 1621)
- May 31 – Frances Carr, Countess of Somerset (d. 1632)
- June 1 – Isaac Manasses de Pas, Marquis de Feuquieres, French soldier (d. 1640)
- June 9 – Caspar Sibelius, Dutch Protestant minister (d. 1658)
- June 19 – Philip Bell, British colonial governor (d. 1678)
- June 24 – Samuel Ampzing, Dutch linguist and historian (d. 1632)
- June 29 – Edward Rodney, English politician (d. 1657)

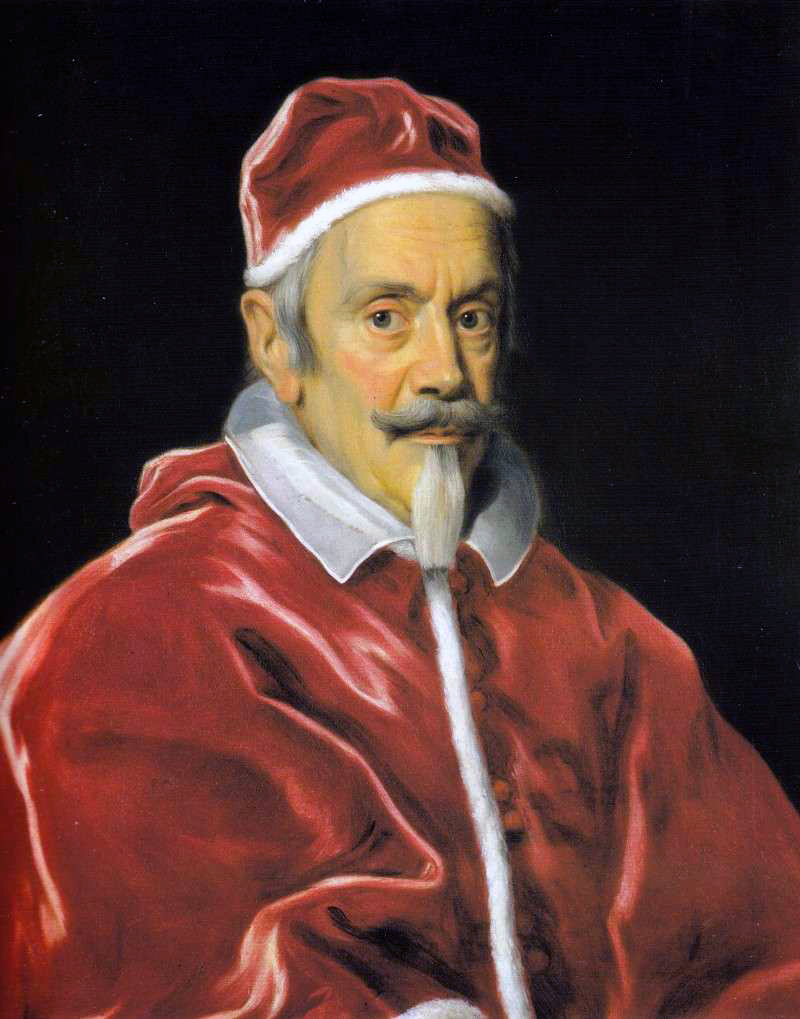
Pope Clement X

- July 3 – Lucrezia Orsina Vizzana, Italian singer and composer (d. 1662)
- July 13 – Pope Clement X (d. 1676)
- July 26 – Johannes Crellius, Polish–German theologian (d. 1633)
- August 6 – Count John Louis of Nassau-Hadamar (d. 1653)
- August 7 – Charles of Austria, Bishop of Wroclaw (d. 1624)
- August 9 – John Webster, colonial settler and governor of Connecticut (d. 1661)
- August 19 – Henry Rich, 1st Earl of Holland, English soldier (d. 1649)
- August 27 – Ferruccio Baffa Trasci, Italian bishop (d. 1656)
- August 30 – Anthony Stapley, English politician (d. 1655)
- September 12 – María de Zayas, Spanish writer (d. 1661)
- September 15 – Erasmus Earle, English barrister and politician (d. 1667)
- October 3 – Anna of Pomerania, Duchess-Consort of Croy and Havré (d. 1660)
- October 11 – William Pynchon, English colonist and fur trader in North America (d. 1662)
- November 25 – Juan Alonso de Cuevas y Davalos, Roman Catholic prelate, Archbishop of Mexico and Antequera (d. 1665)
- December 3 – Daniel Seghers, Flemish Jesuit brother and painter (d. 1661)
- December 14 – John West, colonial governor of Virginia (d. 1659)
- December 18 – William Louis, Count of Nassau-Saarbrücken (d. 1640)
- Angelica Veronica Airola, Italian painter (d. 1670)
- Boris Morozov, Russian statesman and boyar (d. 1661)
- Isaac de Caus, French landscaper (d. 1648)
- Yamada Nagamasa, Japanese adventurer (d. 1630)
- Ii Naokatsu, Japanese daimyō (d. 1662)
- William Bradford, English leader of Plymouth Colony (d. 1657)
- William Browne, English poet (d. 1645)
- Theophilus Eaton, Puritan colonial merchant (d. 1658)
- Kösem Sultan (d. 1651)
- Mícheál Ó Cléirigh, Irish chronicler (d. 1643)
- Marie Vernier, French actress (d. 1627)
- Caterina Assandra, Italian composer (died c. 1618)
- Magdalena Andersdotter, Norwegian-Faroese shipowner (d. 1650)
- Teofila Chmielecka, Polish military role model (d. 1650)
- Marie Fouquet, French medical writer and philanthropist (d. 1681)

1591

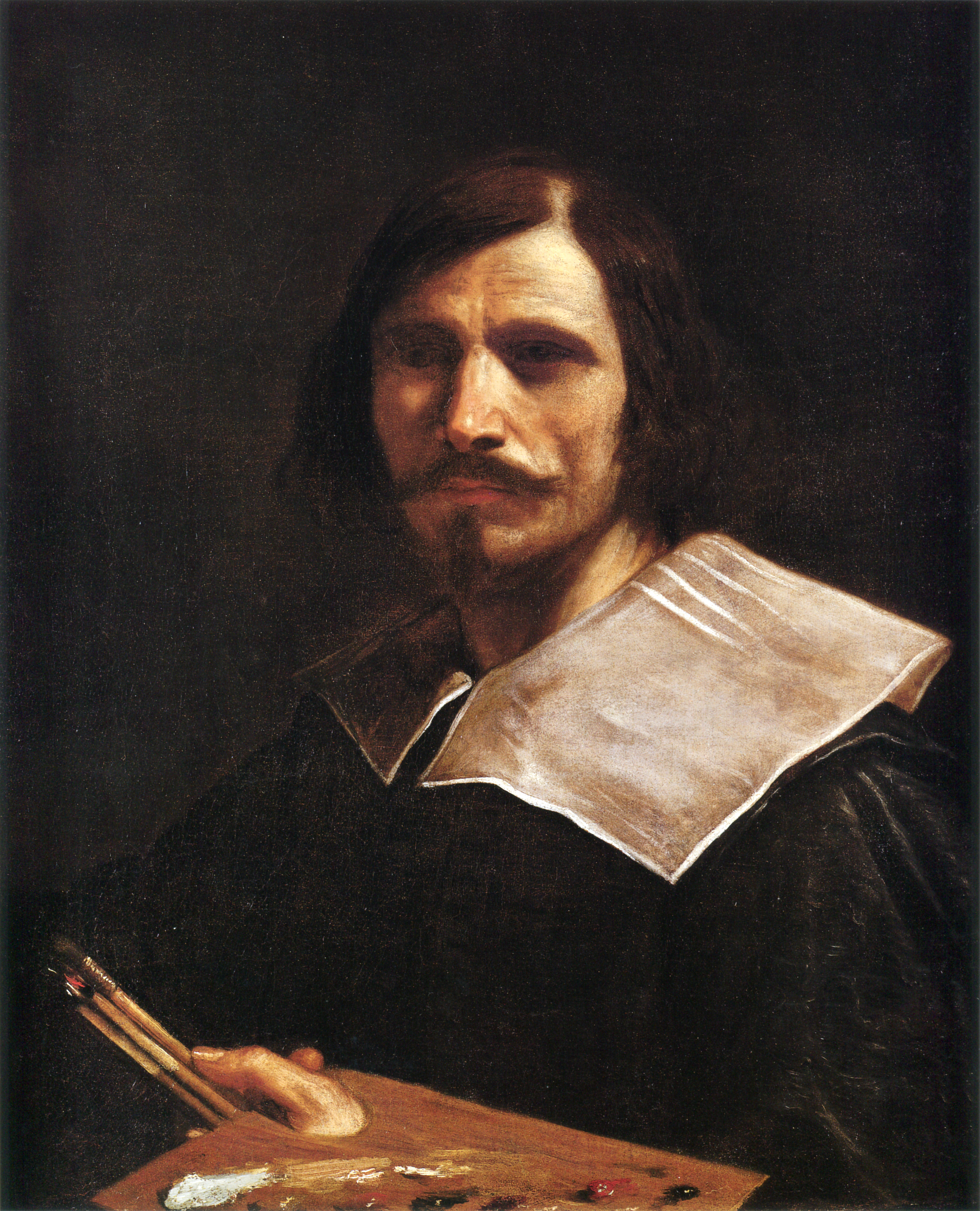
Guercino

- January 3 – Valentin de Boulogne, French painter (d. 1632)
- January 4 – William Spencer, 2nd Baron Spencer of Wormleighton, British baron (d. 1636)
- January 7 – Princess Dorothea, Abbess of Quedlinburg (d. 1617)
- January 11 – Robert Devereux, 3rd Earl of Essex, English Civil War general (d. 1646)
- January 12 – Jusepe de Ribera, Spanish Tenebrist painter and printmaker (d. 1652)
- January 15 – David van Goorle, Dutch theologian and theoretical scientist (d. 1612)
- January 26 – Matthew Boynton, English politician (d. 1647)
- January 29 – Franciscus Junius, pioneer of Germanic philology (d. 1677)
- February 8
  - Hervey Bagot, English politician (d. 1660)
  - Guercino, Italian painter (d. 1666)
- February 13 – Antonio Sabino, Italian composer (d. 1650)
- February 21 (or March 2) – Girard Desargues, French mathematician (d. 1661)
- February 25 – Friedrich von Spee, German Jesuit and poet (d. 1635)
- February 28 – Henry Clifford, 5th Earl of Cumberland, English politician (d. 1643)
- March 2 – Willem Boreel, Dutch diplomat (d. 1668)
- March 3 – Lucas de Wael, Flemish painter (d. 1661)
- March 6 – Tommaso Tamburini, Italian theologian (d. 1675)
- March 9 – Johannes Chrysostomus vander Sterre, Dutch abbot, ecclesiastical writer (d. 1652)
- March 11 – Isabella of Savoy, Italian noble (d. 1626)
- March 15 or 1593 – Alexandre de Rhodes, French Jesuit missionary (d. 1660)
- March 19 – Dirck Hals, Dutch painter (d. 1656)
- March 28 – William Cecil, 2nd Earl of Salisbury, English earl (d. 1668)
- April 5 – Prince Frederick Ulrich, Duke of Brunswick-Lüneburg (d. 1634)
- April 11 – Bartholomeus Strobel, Silezian painter (d. 1650)
- April 25 – Marcos de Torres y Rueda, interim viceroy of New Spain (d. 1649)
- May 2 – Prince Francis Charles of Saxe-Lauenburg (d. 1660)
- May 5 – Frederick Achilles, Duke of Württemberg-Neuenstadt (d. 1631)
- May 26 – Olimpia Maidalchini, Italian noblewoman (d. 1657)
- June 16 – Joseph Solomon Delmedigo, Italian physician, mathematician, and music theorist (d. 1655)
- June 24 – Mustafa I, sultan of the Ottoman empire (d. 1639)
- July 4 – Jonathan Rashleigh, English politician (d. 1675)
- July 9 – Jean Bagot, French theologian (d. 1664)
- July 20 – Anne Hutchinson, English Puritan preacher (d. 1643)
- August 6 – George William, Count Palatine of Zweibrücken-Birkenfeld (d. 1669)
- August 12 – Louise de Marillac, French co-founder of the Daughters of Charity (d. 1660)
- August 24 – Robert Herrick, English poet (d. 1674)
- August 28 – John Christian of Brieg, Duke of Brzeg (1602–1639) (d. 1639)
- September 8 – Marie Angélique Arnauld, French abbess of the Abbey of Port-Royal (d. 1661)

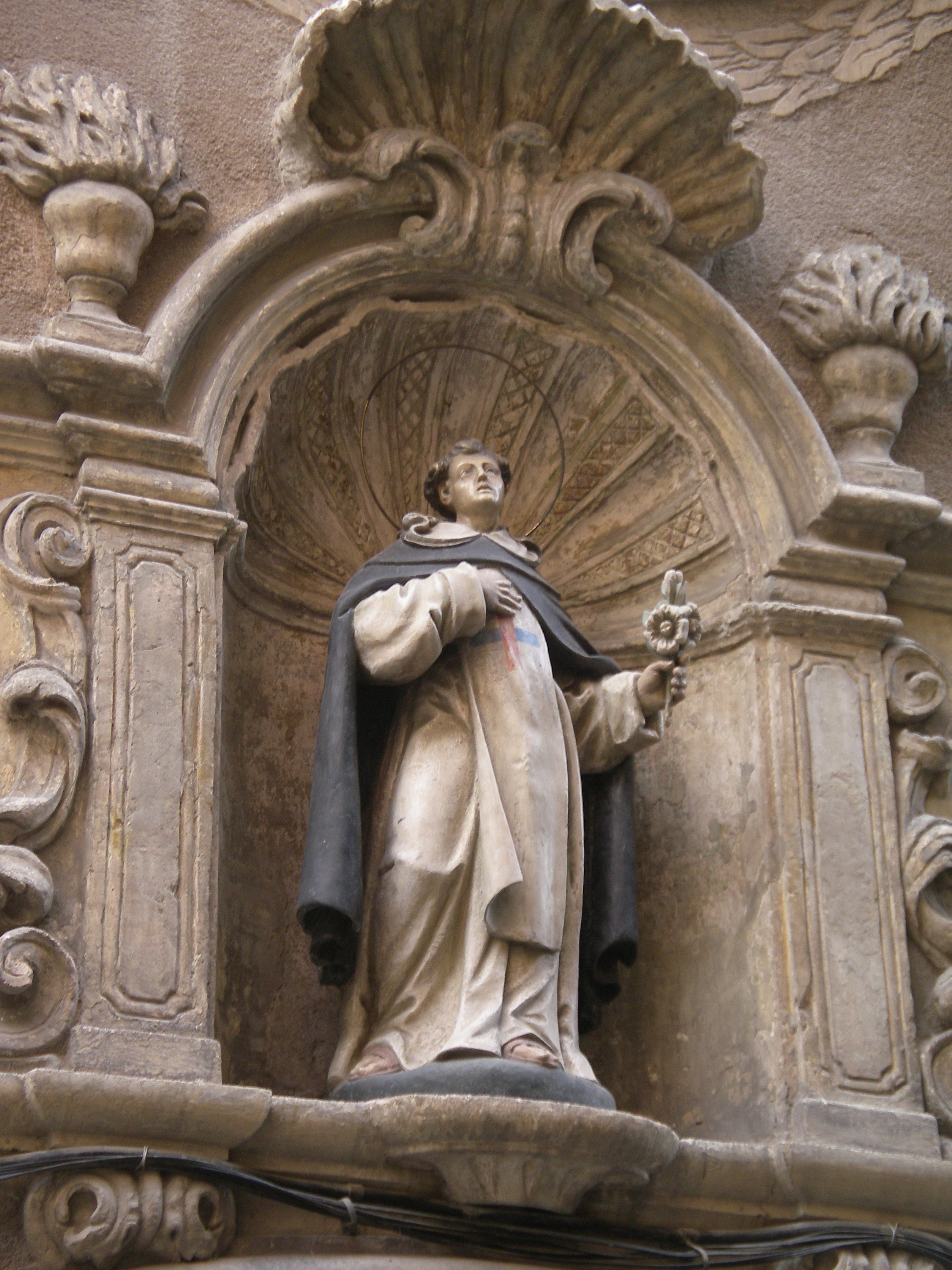
Michael de Sanctis

- September 29 – Michael de Sanctis, Spanish saint (d. 1625)
- October 2 – Margherita Gonzaga, Duchess of Lorraine (1608–1624) (d. 1632)
- October 7 – Pierre Le Muet, French architect (d. 1669)
- October 22 – Alfonso III d'Este, Duke of Modena, Italian noble (d. 1644)
- November 20 – George Albert II, Margrave of Brandenburg (d. 1615)
- November 29 – Bernhard von Mallinckrodt, German bibliophile (d. 1664)
- December 22 – Tommaso Dingli, Maltese architect and sculptor (d. 1666)
- December 30 – Joseph Furttenbach, German architect (d. 1667)
- David Blondel, French Protestant clergyman (d. 1655)
- Andrew Bobola, Polish Jesuit missionary and martyr (d. 1657)
- Thomas Goffe, English dramatist (d. 1629)
- William Lenthall, English politician of the Civil War period (d. 1662)

1592

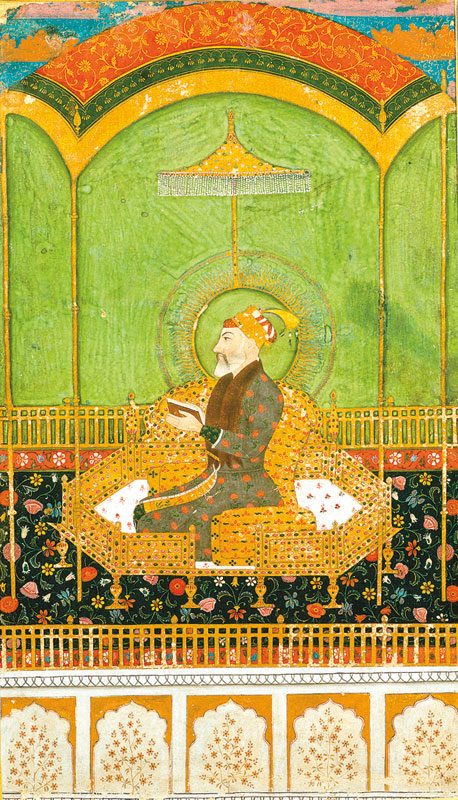
Emperor Shah Jahan born on January 15

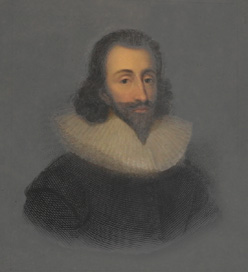
Sir John Eliot born on April 11

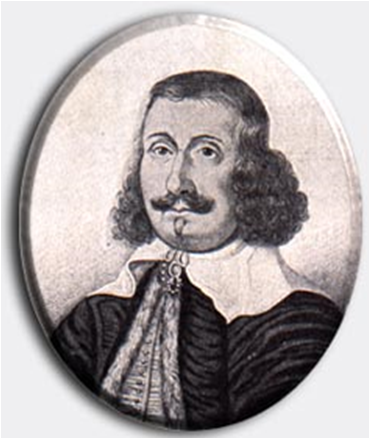
Francis Quarles born on May 8

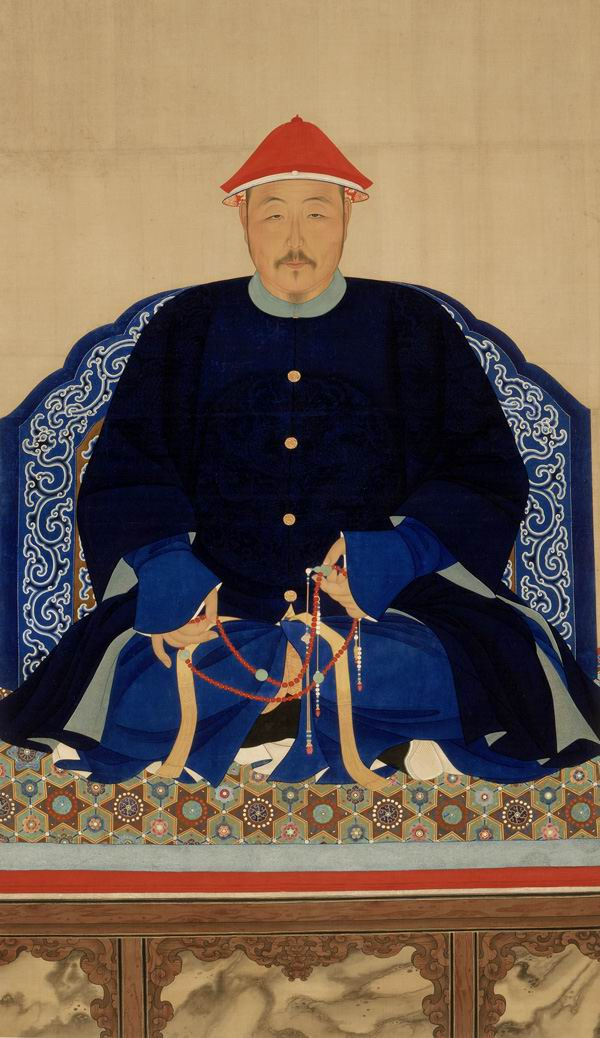
Emperor Hong Taiji born on November 28

- January 5 – Shah Jahan, 5th Mughal Emperor of India from 1628 to 1658 (d. 1666)
- January 22
  - Philippe Alegambe, Belgian Jesuit priest and bibliographer (d. 1652)
  - Pierre Gassendi, French philosopher and scientist (d. 1655)
- February 5 – Vincenzo della Greca, Italian architect (d. 1661)
- February 22 – Nicholas Ferrar, English trader (d. 1637)
- February 23 – Balthazar Gerbier, Dutch painter (d. 1663)
- March 20 – Giovanni da San Giovanni, Italian painter (d. 1636)
- March 28 – Comenius, Czech teacher and writer (d. 1670)
- April 4 – Abraham Elzevir, Dutch printer (d. 1652)
- April 9 – Jiří Třanovský, Czech priest and musician (d. 1637)
- April 11 – John Eliot, Member of Parliament, Statesman, Vice-Admiral of Devon (d. 1632)
- April 15 – Francesco Maria Brancaccio, Catholic cardinal (d. 1675)
- April 22 – Wilhelm Schickard, German inventor (d. 1635)
- April 24
  - Marcos Ramírez de Prado y Ovando, Roman Catholic prelate who served as Archbishop of Mexico (d. 1667)
  - Sir John Trelawny, 1st Baronet, British baronet (d. 1664)
- May 8 – Francis Quarles, English poet most famous for his Emblem book aptly entitled Emblems (d. 1644)
- May 14 – Alice Barnham, wife of English scientific philosopher and statesman Francis Bacon (d. 1650)
- June 7 – Balthasar Cordier, Belgian Jesuit exegete, editor (d. 1650)
- June 9 – Jean de Brisacier, French Jesuit (d. 1668)
- June 13
  - Sophia Hedwig of Brunswick-Lüneburg, German noblewoman (d. 1642)
  - Tobias Michael, German composer and cantor (d. 1657)
- July 10 – Pierre d'Hozier, French historian (d. 1660)
- July 20 – Johan Björnsson Printz, governor of New Sweden (d. 1663)
- August 1 – François le Métel de Boisrobert, French poet (d. 1662)
- August 7 – Arnauld de Oihenart, Basque historian and poet (d. 1668)
- August 11 – Carlo de Tocco, Italian nobleman (d. 1674)
- August 13 – William, Count of Nassau-Siegen, German count (d. 1642)
- August 16 – Wybrand de Geest, Dutch painter (d. 1661)
- August 28 – George Villiers, 1st Duke of Buckingham, English statesman (d. 1628)
- August 29 – Sir Benjamin Ayloffe, 2nd Baronet, English politician (d. 1662)
- September 1 – Maria Angela Astorch, Spanish mystic and saint (d. 1665)
- September 5 – Jacopo Vignali, Italian painter (d. 1664)
- September 15 – Giovanni Battista Rinuccini, archbishop of Fermo (d. 1653)
- September 18 – Jean Guyon, French colonist (d. 1663)
- September 20 – Nicholas Stoughton, English politician (d. 1648)
- September 21 – Nathaniel Foote, American colonist (d. 1644)
- September 24 – Christopher Wandesford, English administrator and politician (d. 1640)
- September 25 – Herman Krefting, Norwegian businessman (d. 1651)
- October 7 – Henry Wenceslaus, Duke of Oels-Bernstadt, Duke of Bernstadt (1617 – 1639) (d. 1639)
- October 13 – Christian Gueintz, German teacher and writer-grammarian (d. 1650)
- October 22 – Gustav Horn, Count of Pori, Swedish/Finnish soldier and politician (d. 1657)
- October 30 – Giulio Benso, Italian painter (d. 1668)
- November 4
  - Gerard van Honthorst, Dutch painter (d. 1656)
  - Albrecht von Kalckstein, German noble (d. 1667)
- November 5 – Charles Chauncy, English-born president of Harvard College (d. 1671)
- November 13 – Antonio Grassi, Italian priest (d. 1671)
- November 28 – Hong Taiji, Emperor of China (d. 1643)
- December 5 – Thomas Bennet, successful civil lawyer (d. 1670)
- December 6 – William Cavendish, 1st Duke of Newcastle (d. 1676)
- December 9 – Krzysztof Arciszewski, Polish-Lithuanian noble (d. 1656)
- December 29 – Johannes Matthiae Gothus, Swedish academic (d. 1670)
- Catalina de Erauso, Spanish-Mexican nun and soldier (d. 1650)
- Richard Bellingham, American colonial magistrate (d. 1672)
- John Hacket, English churchman (d. 1670)
- Angélique Paulet, French salonnière, singer, musician and actress (d. 1651)
- Ingen, Chinese Zen Buddhist poet, calligrapher (d. 1673)
- John Jenkins, English composer (d. 1678)
- John Oldham, early English settler in Massachusetts (d. 1636)
- Walatta Petros, saint in the Ethiopian Orthodox Tewahedo Church (d. 1642)
- Sara Copia Sullam, Italian poet and writer (d. 1641)
- Étienne Brûlé, French explorer in Canada (d. 1632)

1593

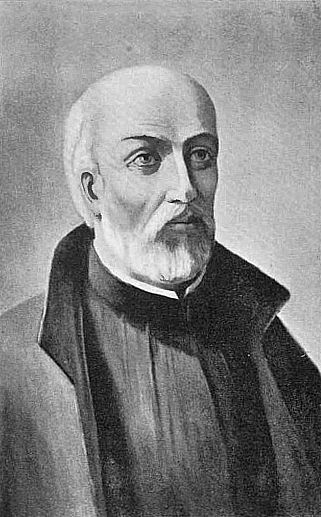
Saint Jean de Brebeuf

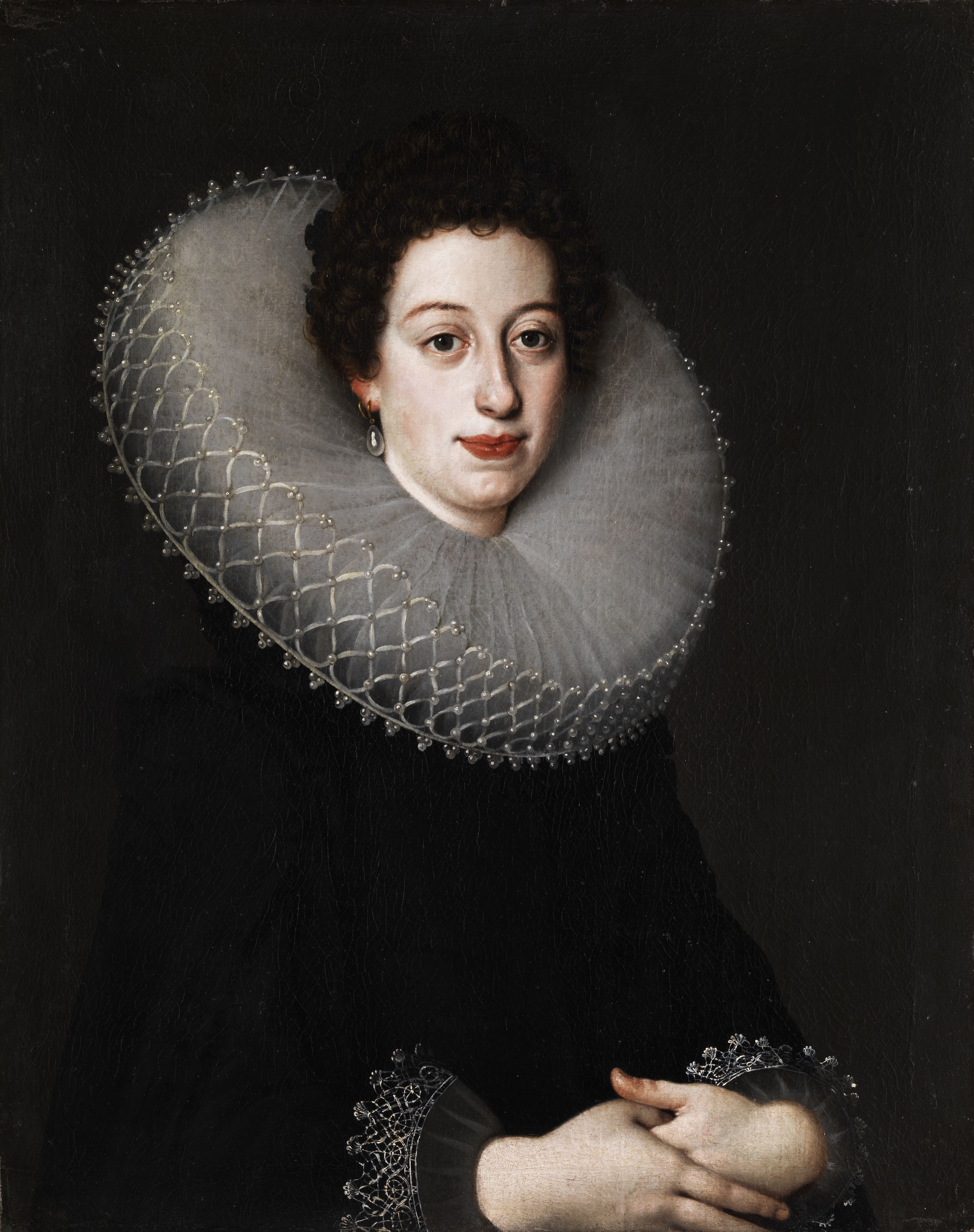
Catherine de' Medici, Governor of Siena

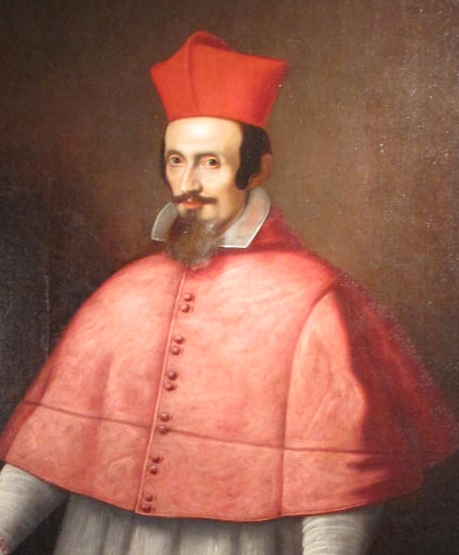
Cesare Monti

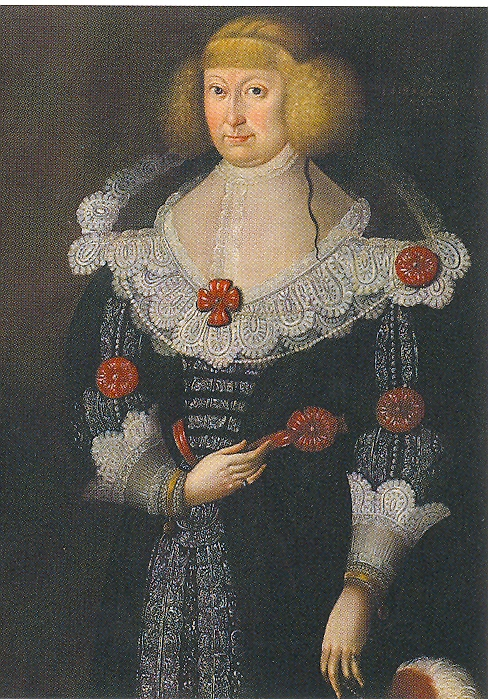
Elisabeth of Brunswick-Wolfenbuttel, Duchess of Saxe-Altenburg

- January 1 – Sun Chuanting, Ming Dynasty general (d. 1643)
- January 10 – Prince Maurice of Savoy, Catholic cardinal and Prince of Savoy (d. 1657)
- February 8 – Louis de Nogaret de La Valette, French Catholic Cardinal (d. 1639)
- February 24 – Henry de Vere, 18th Earl of Oxford, English noble (d. 1625)
- March 1 – Franz Wilhelm von Wartenberg, German Catholic cardinal (d. 1661)
- March 13 – Georges de La Tour, French Baroque painter (d. 1652)
- March 20 – Jean de La Haye, French preacher and biblical scholar (d. 1661)
- March 22 – Johann Ulrich Steigleder, German composer (d. 1635)
- March 25 – Jean de Brébeuf, French Jesuit missionary who travelled to Canada in 1625 (d. 1649)
- April – Mumtaz Mahal, Queen of India (d. 1631)
- April 3 – George Herbert, Welsh-born English poet (d. 1633)
- April 4 – Edward Nicholas, English statesman (d. 1669)
- April 12 – Nicholas Martyn, English politician (d. 1653)
- April 13 – Thomas Wentworth, 1st Earl of Strafford, English statesman (d. 1641)
- April 19 – Sir John Hobart, 2nd Baronet, English politician (d. 1647)
- April 27 – Jérôme Lalemant, French Jesuit priest and missionary to Canada (d. 1673)
- May 2
  - John Forbes, Scottish theologian (d. 1648)
  - Catherine de' Medici, Governor of Siena, Italian princess (d. 1629)
- May 5 – Cesare Monti, Italian cardinal, Archbishop of Milan (d. 1650)
- May 19
  - Jacob Jordaens, Flemish painter (d. 1678)
  - Claude Vignon, French painter (d. 1670)
- June 3 – Richard Knightley, English politician (d. 1639)
- June 8 – George I Rákóczi, Hungarian prince of Transylvania (d. 1648)
- June 22 – Sir John Gell, 1st Baronet, Parliamentarian politician and military figure in the English Civil War (d. 1671)
- June 23 – Elisabeth of Brunswick-Wolfenbüttel, Duchess of Saxe-Altenburg (d. 1650)
- June 24 – Abraham von Franckenberg, German writer (d. 1652)

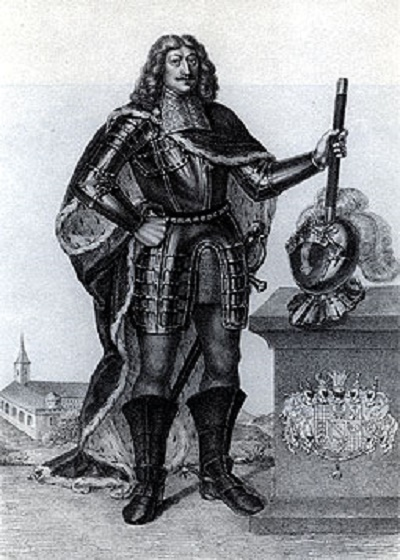
William, Margrave of Baden-Baden

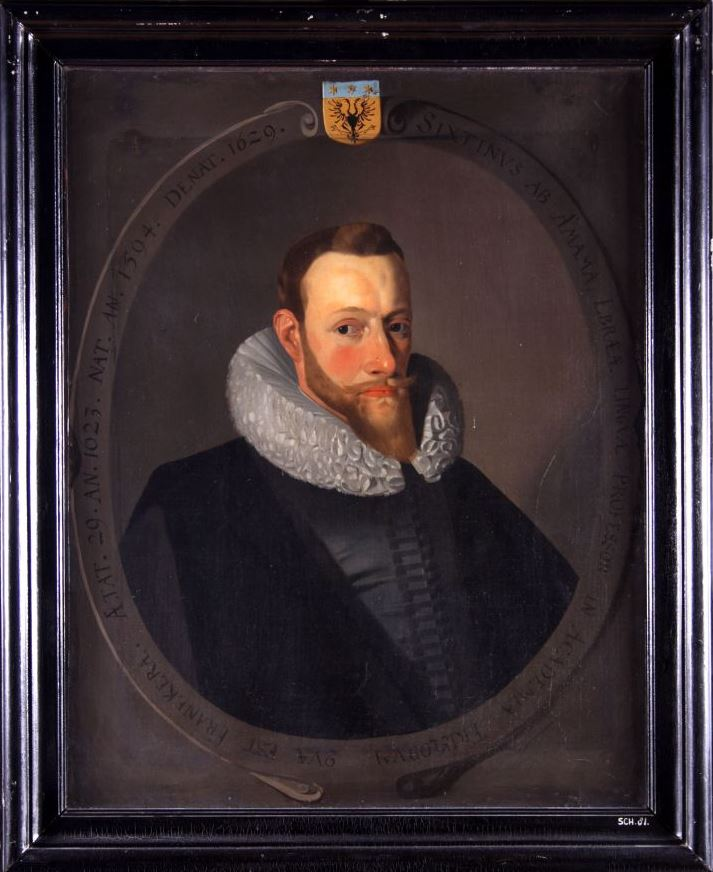
Sixtinus Amama

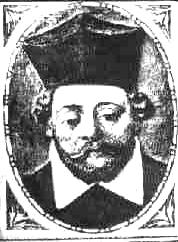
Liborius Wagner

- July 5 – Achille d'Étampes de Valençay, Knight of Malta (d. 1646)
- July 8
  - Artemisia Gentileschi, Italian painter (d. 1656)
  - Peter Sainthill, English politician (d. 1648)
- July 20 – Henry Ernest, Count of Stolberg, then count of Stolberg-Ilsenburg (d. 1672)
- July 30 – William, Margrave of Baden-Baden (1596–1677) (d. 1677)
- August 9 – Izaak Walton, English writer (d. 1683)
- August 12 – Jonathan Brewster, American settler (d. 1659)
- August 30 – Noël Juchereau, Quebec pioneer (d. 1648)
- September 5 – Orazio Riminaldi, Italian painter (d. 1630)
- September 8 – Toyotomi Hideyori, Japanese nobleman (d. 1615)
- September 20 – Gottfried Scheidt, German composer (d. 1661)
- September 22 – A. Matthäus Merian, Swiss cartographer (d. 1650)
- September 26 – Francis Osborne, English writer (d. 1659)
- October 6 – Jobst Herman, Count of Schaumburg (d. 1635)
- October 9 – Nicolaes Tulp, Dutch anatomist and politician (d. 1674)
- October 13 – Sixtinus Amama, Dutch Reformed theologian and orientalist (d. 1629)
- October 23 – Michael Warton, English politician (d. 1645)
- October 27 – Christoffer Urne, Governor General of Norway (d. 1663)
- November 1 – Abel Servien, French diplomat (d. 1659)
- November 25 – Alain de Solminihac, French bishop and beatified person (d. 1659)
- December 5 – Liborius Wagner, German Roman Catholic priest (d. 1631)
- December 11 – Sir William Airmine, 1st Baronet, English politician (d. 1651)
- December 12
  - Adam Christian Agricola, German Evangelical preacher (d. 1645)
  - Nathaniel Bacon, English politician (d. 1660)
- Leonardo Agostini, Italian antiquary (d. 1685)
- Louis Barbier, French bishop (d. 1670)
- Francis Russell, 4th Earl of Bedford (d. 1641)
- Claudia Rusca, Italian composer, singer, and organist (d. 1676)
- Mervyn Tuchet, 2nd Earl of Castlehaven (d. 1631)
- Anthony van Diemen, Dutch merchant (d. 1645)
- Jerónimo Lobo, Portuguese Jesuit missionary (d. 1678)
- Mikołaj Ostroróg, Polish nobleman (d. 1651)
- Sir George Radcliffe, English politician (d. 1657)
- Kimura Shigenari, Japanese samurai (d. 1615)
- Giovanni Battista Pacetti, Italian painter (d. 1630)

1594

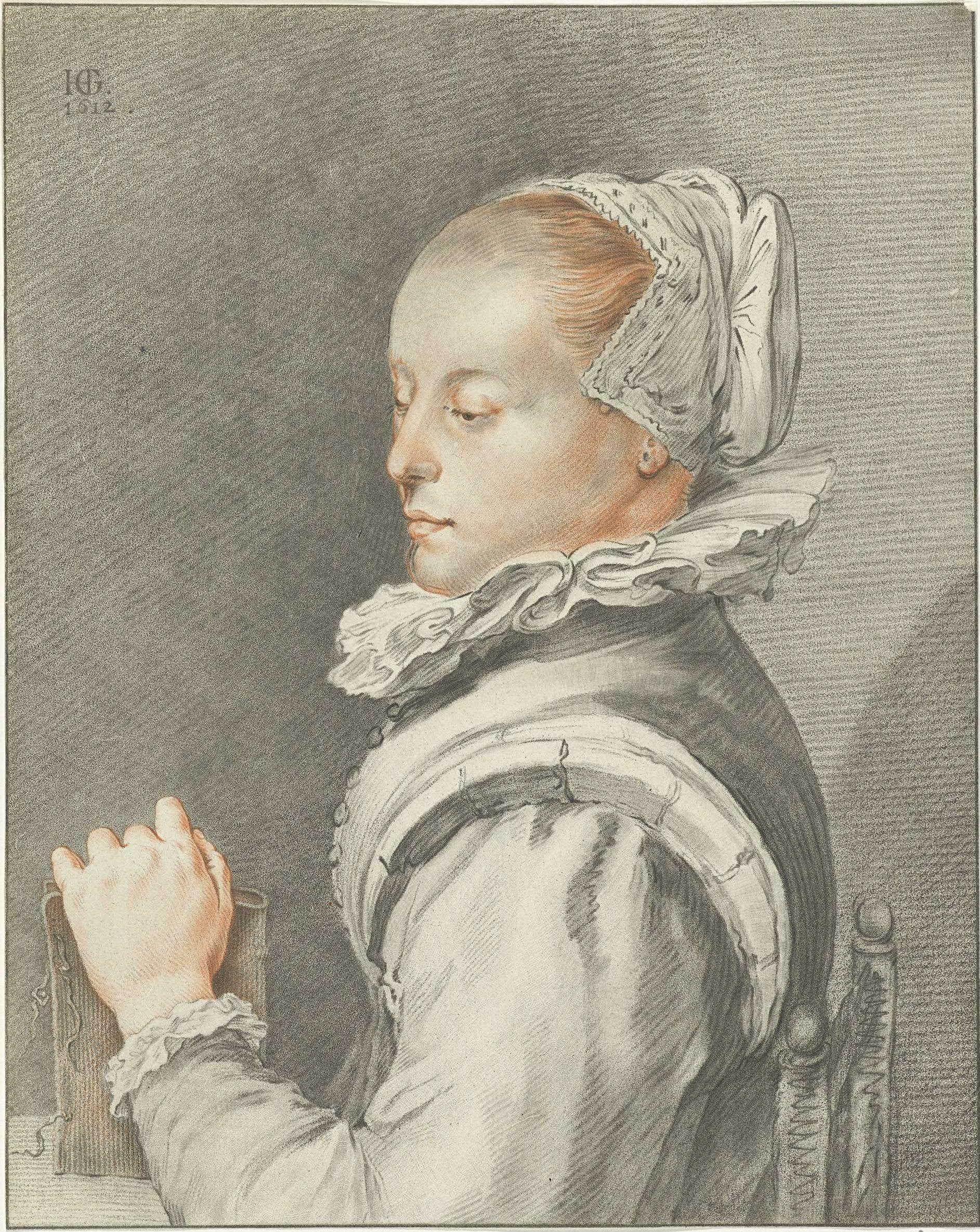
Maria Tesselschade Visscher

- January 1 – Barthélemy Vimont, French missionary (d. 1667)
- January 7 – Vincenzo II Gonzaga, Duke of Mantua, Italian duke and Catholic cardinal (d. 1627)
- January 12 – Gregers Krabbe, Governor-general of Norway (d. 1655)
- January 16 – Maeda Toshitsune, Japanese warlord (d. 1658)
- January 24 – Pierre de Marca, French bishop and historian (d. 1662)
- February 2 – Philip Powell, Welsh martyr (d. 1646)
- February 5 – Biagio Marini, Italian violinist and composer (d. 1663)
- February 16 – Juliana Morell, Spanish-French scholar (d. 1653)
- February 19 – Henry Frederick, Prince of Wales, elder son of King James I & VI and Anne of Denmark (d. 1612)
- February 21 – John Ernest I, Duke of Saxe-Weimar, German duke (d. 1626)
- February 26 – William Wadsworth, American colonial (d. 1675)
- March 25 – Maria Tesselschade Visscher, Dutch poet and engraver (d. 1649)
- April 21 – Bernardino Spada, Italian Catholic cardinal (d. 1661)
- April 29 – Samuel Fairclough, English minister (d. 1677)
- May 1 – John Haynes, governor of Connecticut (d. 1653)
- May 9 – Louis Henry, Prince of Nassau-Dillenburg, military leader in the Thirty Years' War (d. 1662)
- May 15 – Sophie of Solms-Laubach, wife of Joachim Ernst, Margrave of Brandenburg-Ansbach (d. 1651)
- May 29 – Gottfried Heinrich Graf zu Pappenheim, field marshal of the Holy Roman Empire in the Thirty Years' War (d. 1632)
- June 3 – César, Duke of Vendôme, French nobleman (d. 1665)
- June 11 – Thomas Cromwell, 1st Earl of Ardglass, English nobleman (d. 1653)
- June 23 – Thomas Tyrrell, English judge and politician (d. 1672)
- June – Nicolas Poussin, French painter (d. 1665)

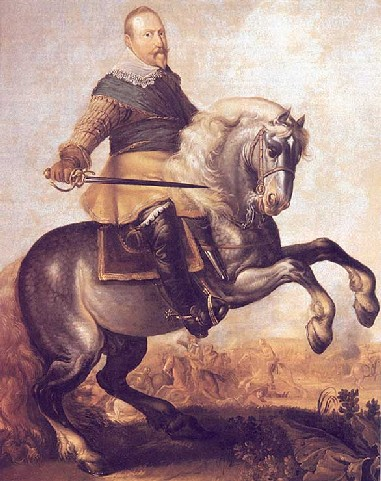
King Gustavus Adolphus of Sweden

- July 6 – Frederick V, Margrave of Baden-Durlach (1622–1659) (d. 1659)
- July 10 – Bartolomeo Gennari, Italian painter (d. 1661)
- July 14 – Beat Albrecht von Ramstein, German Catholic bishop (d. 1651)
- August 4 – Aleksander Ludwik Radziwiłł, Polish noble (d. 1654)
- August 5 – Stefano Durazzo, Italian cardinal (d. 1667)
- August 16 – Queen Inyeol, Korean royal consort (d. 1636)
- September 13 – Francesco Manelli, Italian composer (d. 1667)
- September 30 – Antoine Girard de Saint-Amant, French poet (d. 1661)
- October 4 – Johan Schatter, Dutch Golden Age member of the Haarlem schutterij (d. 1673)
- October 27 – Johann Rudolf Wettstein, Swiss diplomat (d. 1666)
- November 15 – Jean Puget de la Serre, French author and dramatist (d. 1665)
- November 24 – Henry Grey, 10th Earl of Kent (d. 1651)
- November 26 – James Ware, Irish genealogist (d. 1666)
- November 30 – John Cosin, English churchman (d. 1672)
- December 7 – Frederik Coning, Dutch Golden Age member of the Haarlem schutterij (d. 1636)
- December 8 – Pierre Petit, French astronomer, military engineer, and physicist (d. 1677)
- December 9 – King Gustavus Adolphus of Sweden, Swedish king and general (d. 1632)
- December 21 – Robert Sutton, 1st Baron Lexinton, English politician (d. 1668)
- December 24 – Otto, Landgrave of Hesse-Kassel, Prince of Hesse-Kassel, Administrator of Hersfeld Abbey (d. 1617)
- December 27 – Ove Gjedde, Danish admiral, member of the interim government after the death of Christian IV (d. 1660)
- John Bramhall, English Anglican clergyman and controversialist (d. 1663)
- Peter Oliver, English miniaturist (d. 1648)
- Tomasz Zamoyski, Polish nobleman (d. 1638)
- Tarquinio Merula, Italian composer (d. 1665)

1595

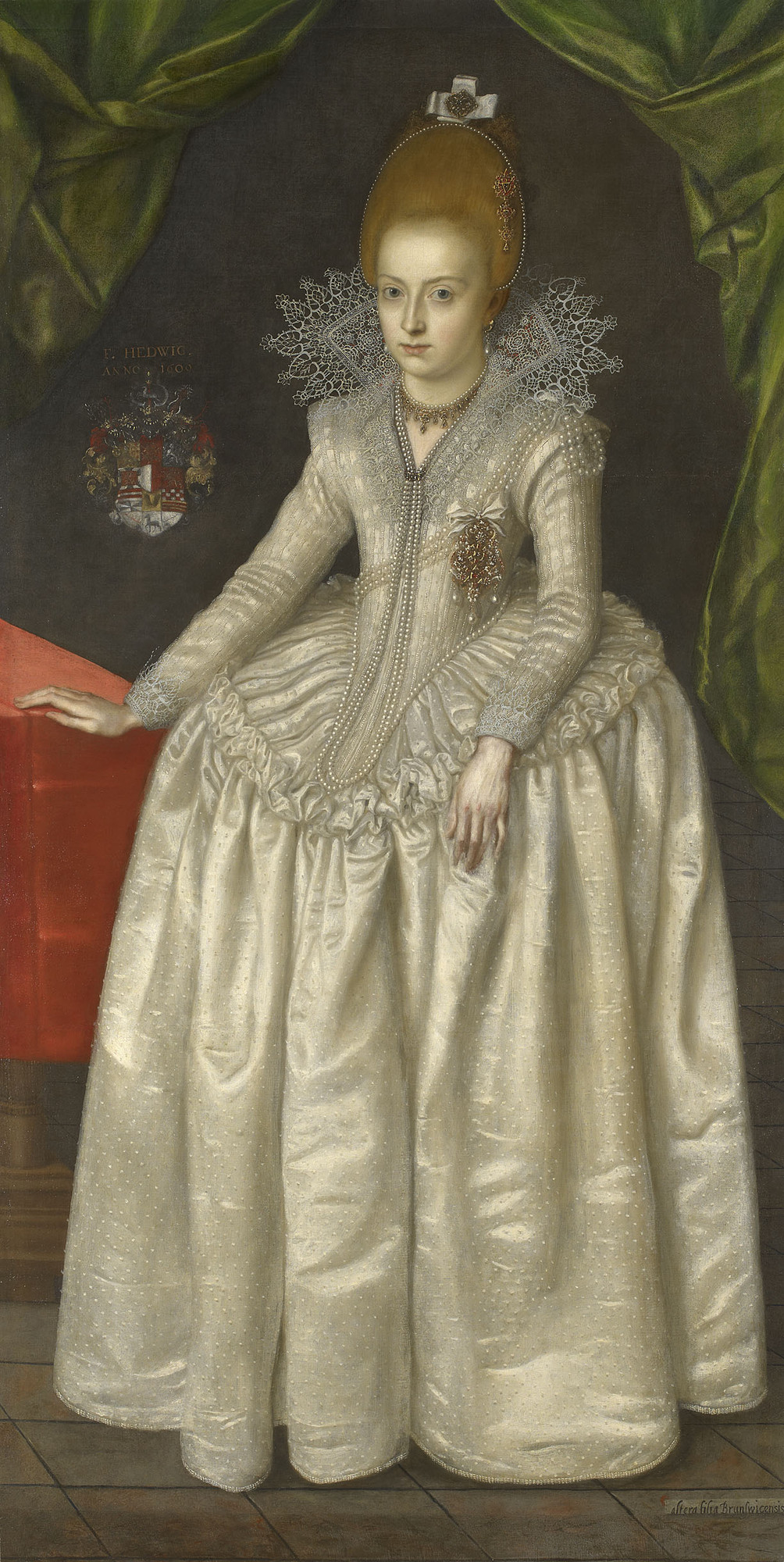
Hedwig of Brunswick-Wolfenbüttel

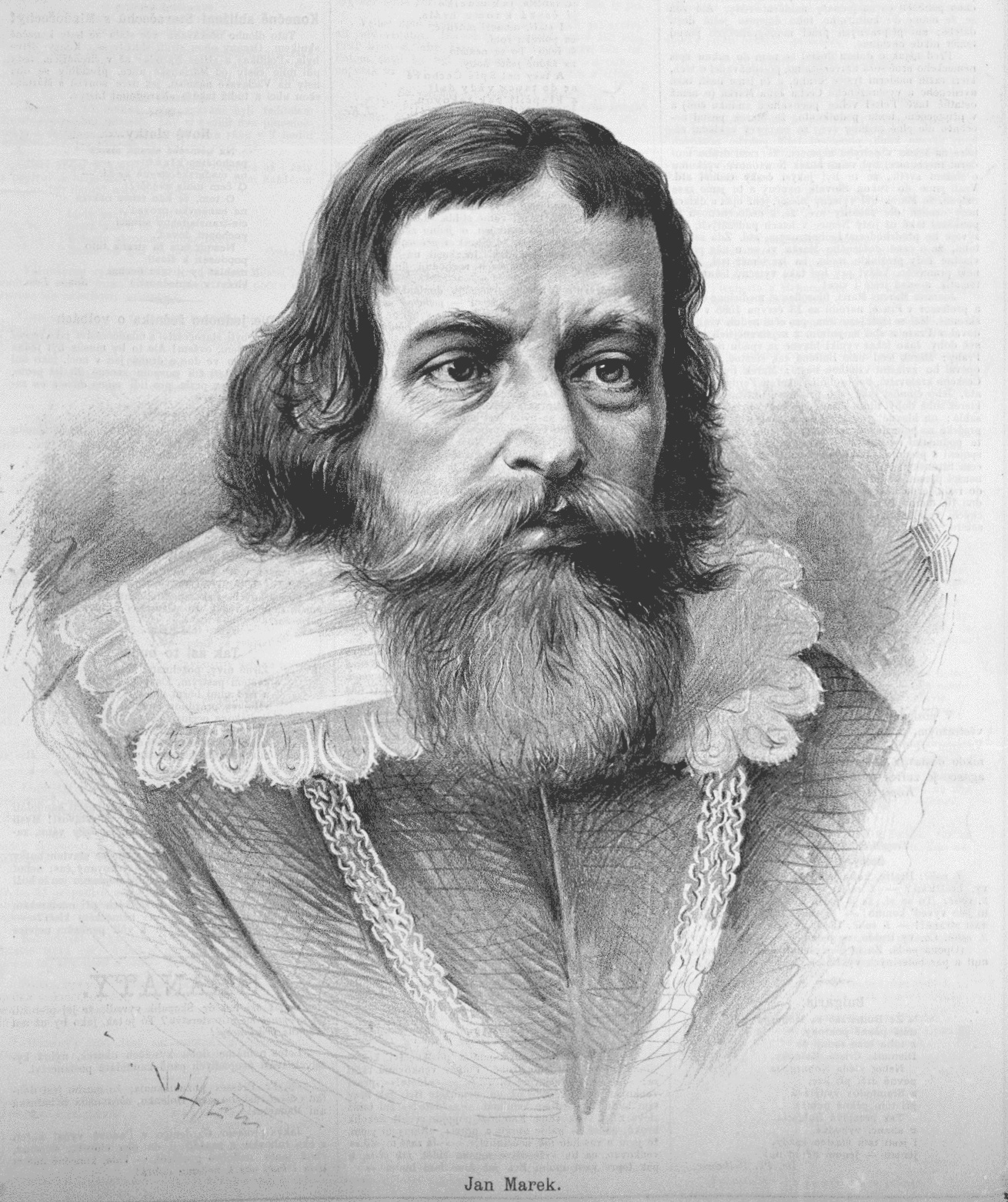
Jan Marek Marci

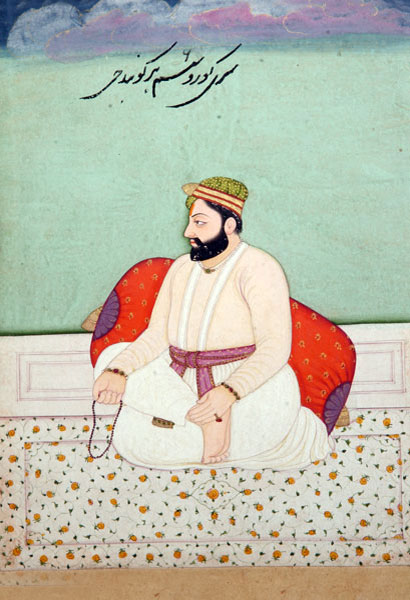
Guru Hargobind

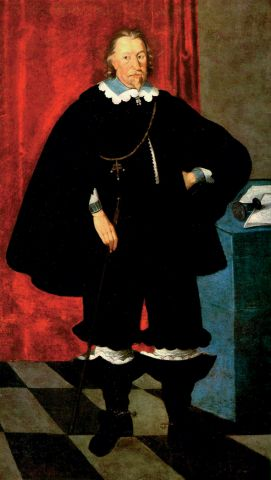
Albrycht Stanisław Radziwiłł

- January 15 – Henry Carey, 2nd Earl of Monmouth, English politician (d. 1661)
- January 22 – George Rudolf of Liegnitz, Polish noble (d. 1653)
- January 23 – Herman Fortunatus, Margrave of Baden-Rodemachern (d. 1665)
- February 9 – Hedwig of Brunswick-Wolfenbüttel, Duchess consort of Pomerania (d. 1650)
- March 19 – Carlo de' Medici, Italian Catholic cardinal (d. 1666)
- March 21 – Ferdinando Ughelli, Italian Cistercian monk and church historian (d. 1670)
- March 23 – Bevil Grenville, English royalist soldier (d. 1643)
- April 5 – John Wilson, English composer (d. 1674)
- April 6
  - Henri II d'Orléans, Duke of Longueville, Prince of France (d. 1663)
  - Pieter de Molijn, Dutch painter (d. 1661)
- April 12 – Miles Hobart, English politician (d. 1632)
- April 30
  - Anne Lykke, Danish noble (d. 1641)
  - Henri II de Montmorency, French nobleman and military commander (d. 1632)
- May 1 – Lars Kagg, Swedish count and military Officer (d. 1661)
- May 3 – Aloysius Gottifredi, Italian Jesuit (d. 1652)
- June 9 – King Wladislaus IV of Poland (d. 1648)
- June 10 – Aegidius Gelenius, German heraldist (d. 1656)
- June 13
  - John Holles, 2nd Earl of Clare, English politician and Earl (d. 1666)
  - Jan Marek Marci, Bohemian physician and scientist (d. 1667)
- June 19 – Guru Har Gobind, the Sixth Sikh Guru (d. 1644)
- June 24 – Ulderico Carpegna, Italian Catholic cardinal (d. 1679)
- July 1 – Albrycht Stanisław Radziwiłł, Polish nobleman (d. 1656)
- July 3 – John Gurdon, English politician (d. 1679)
- July 4 – Félix Castello, Spanish artist (d. 1651)
- July 9 – Anna Amalia of Baden-Durlach, Regent of Nassau-Saarbrücken (d. 1651)
- July 10 – Charles Drelincourt, French Protestant divine (d. 1669)
- July 31 – Philipp Wolfgang, Count of Hanau-Lichtenberg (d. 1641)
- August 29 – Joachim Ernest, Duke of Schleswig-Holstein-Sonderburg-Plön (1622–1671) (d. 1671)
- August 31 – Georges Fournier, French Jesuit mathematician and geographer (d. 1652)
- October 18 – Lucas van Uden, Dutch painter (d. 1672)
- October 30 – Gaj Singh of Marwar, Raja of Marwar Kingdom (r (d. 1638)
- November 11 – Martin Bauzer, Gorizian Jesuit priest and writer (d. 1668)
- November 13 – George William, Elector of Brandenburg (d. 1640)
- November 18
  - Niklaus Dachselhofer, Swiss politician (d. 1670)
  - Pietro Desani, Italian painter (d. 1647)
- December 1 – Robert Sidney, 2nd Earl of Leicester, English politician (d. 1677)
- December 3 – Henry Ley, 2nd Earl of Marlborough, English politician (d. 1638)
- December 4 – Jean Chapelain, French poet and critic during the Grand Siècle (d. 1674)
- December 5 – Henry Lawes, English musician and composer (d. 1662)
- December 7 – Injo of Joseon, sixteenth king of the Joseon dynasty in Korea (d. 1649)
- December 11 – Heo Mok, Korean politician, poet and scholar (d. 1682)
- December 14 – Arthur Wilson, English writer (d. 1652)
- December 27 – Bohdan Khmelnytsky, hetman of Ukraine (d. 1657)
- Thomas Carew, English poet (d. 1645)
- Miles Corbet, English Puritan politician (d. 1662)
- Jean Desmarets, French writer (d. 1676)
- Henry Herbert, English official (d. 1673)
- Lars Kagg, Swedish soldier and politician (d. 1661)
- Thomas May, English poet and historian (d. 1650)
- Bartholomaeus Nigrinus, Polish Rosicrucian (d. 1646)
- Pocahontas, Algonquian princess (d. 1617)
- Mikołaj Potocki, Polish politician (d. 1651)
- Robert Sempill the younger, Scottish writer (d. 1663)
- Cornelius Vermuyden, Dutch engineer (d. 1683)
- Dirck van Baburen, Dutch painter (d. 1624)
- Albrycht Stanisław Radziwiłł, Lithuanian chancellor (d. 1656)

1596

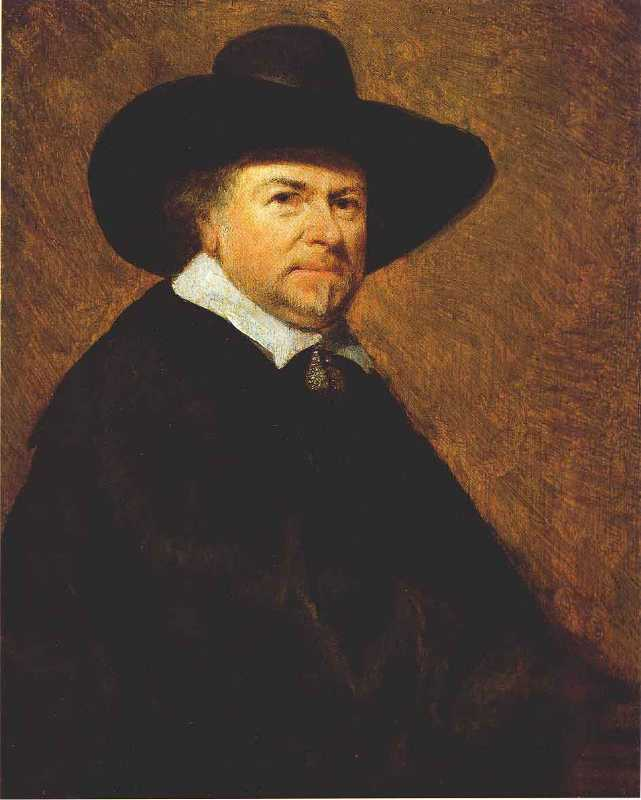
Jan van Goyen

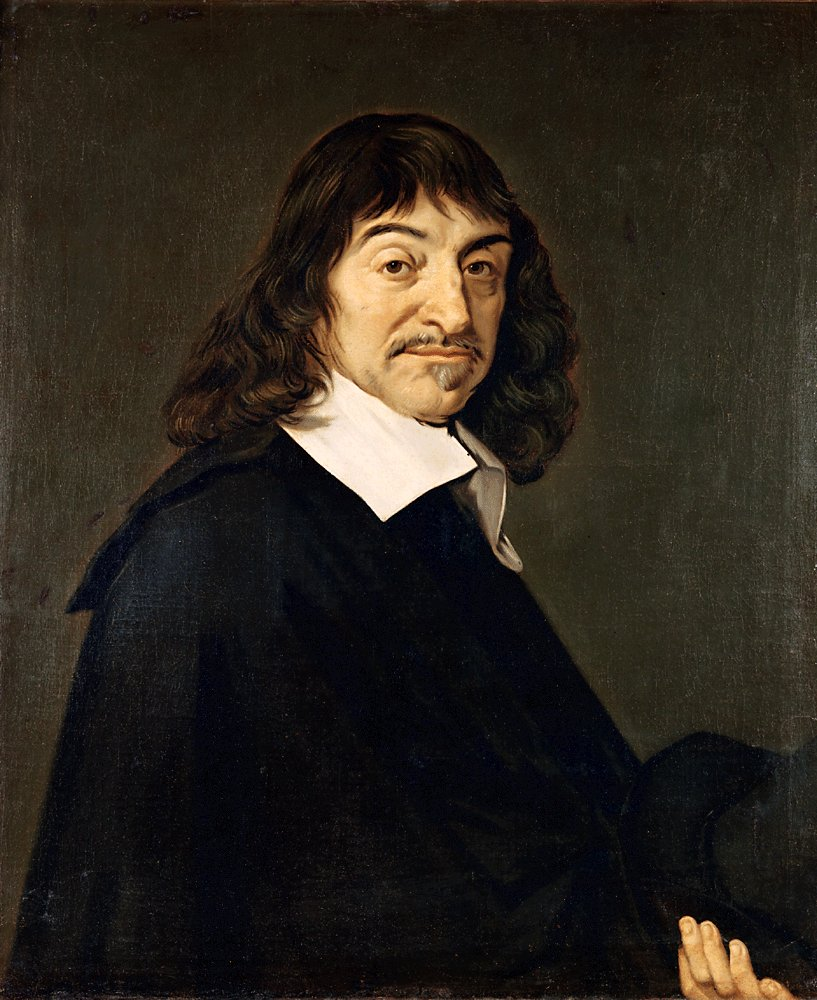
René Descartes

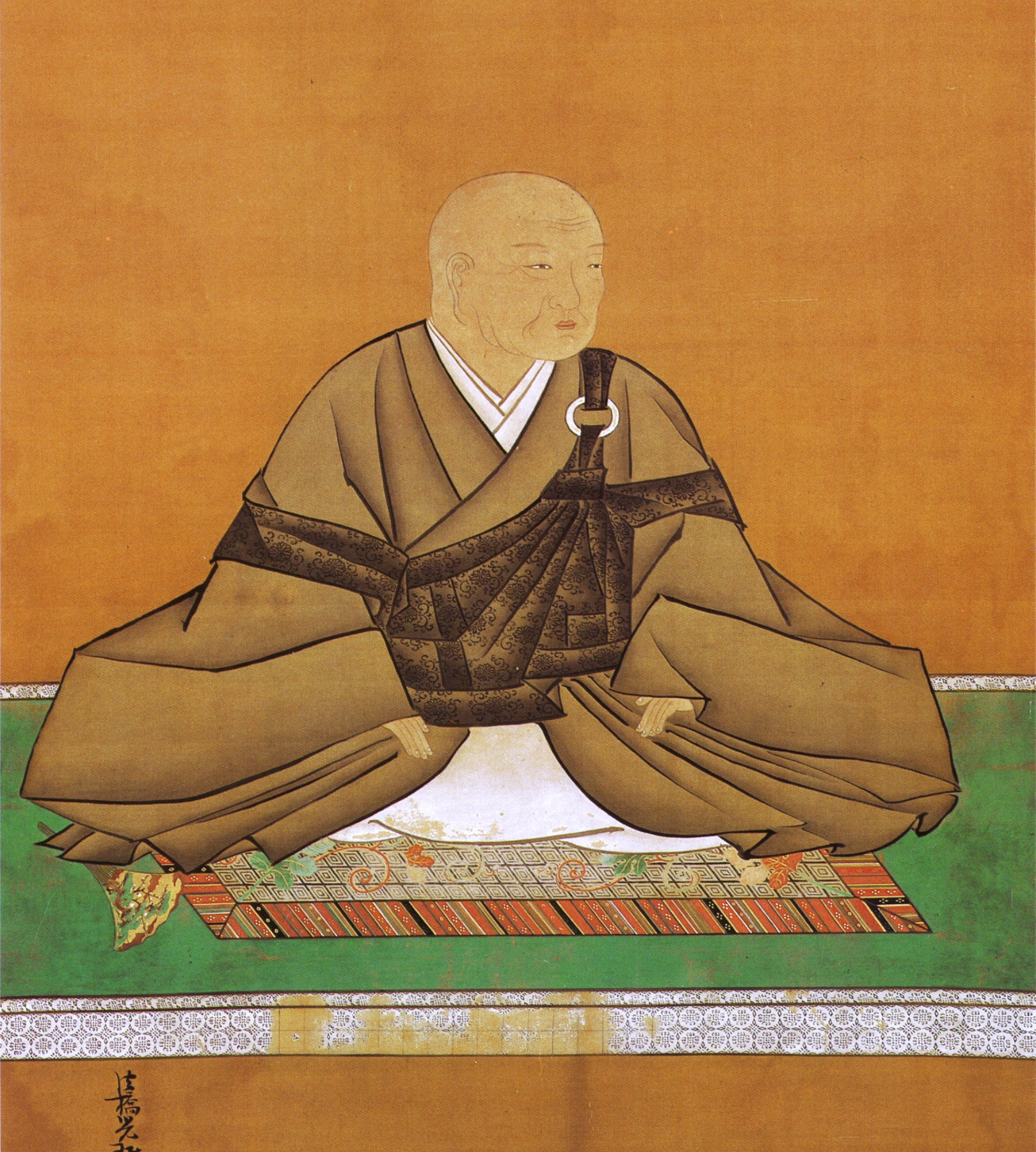
Emperor Go-Mizunoo

- January 1 – Elizabeth Ribbing, Swedish noble (d. 1662)
- January 13 – Jan van Goyen, Dutch painter (d. 1656)
- February 2
  - Jacob van Campen, Dutch artist and architect of the Golden Age (d. 1657)
  - Carew Mildmay, Member of the Parliament of England (d. 1676)
- February 3 – Brás Garcia de Mascarenhas, soldier, poet and writer (d. 1656)
- February 8 – Louis Giry, French lawyer, classical scholar (d. 1665)
- February 27 – Johan Stiernhöök, Swedish lawyer (d. 1675)
- March 1 – Duke Frederick of Saxe-Weimar, German prince and colonel (d. 1622)
- March 10 – Princess Maria Elizabeth of Sweden (d. 1618)
- March 11 – Isaac Elzevir, Dutch printer and publisher (d. 1651)
- March 16 – Ebba Brahe, Swedish countess (d. 1674)
- March 24 – Elizabeth of Hesse-Kassel, Duchess of Mecklenburg-Gütsrow (d. 1625)
- March 26 – Catherine Henriette de Bourbon, French noble (d. 1663)
- March 31 – René Descartes, French philosopher and mathematician (d. 1650)
- April 8 – Juan van der Hamen, Spanish artist (d. 1631)
- April 11 – Moritz Gudenus, German Catholic preacher (d. 1680)
- May 9 – Abraham van Diepenbeeck, Dutch painter (d. 1675)
- May 21 – John Louis II, Count of Nassau-Wiesbaden-Idstein (d. 1605)
- June 5 – Peter Wtewael, Dutch painter (d. 1660)
- June 6 – Michel Particelli d'Emery, French politician (d. 1650)
- June 23 – Johan Banér, Swedish field marshal in the Thirty Years' War (d. 1641)
- June 27 – Maximilian, Prince of Dietrichstein, German prince (d. 1655)
- June 29 – Emperor Go-Mizunoo of Japan (d. 1680)
- July 1 – Bertuccio Valiero, Doge of Venice (d. 1658)
- July 12 – Michael I of Russia, Russian Tsar (d. 1645)
- August 10 – Lorentz Eichstadt, German mathematician and astronomer (d. 1660)
- August 26 – Frederick V, Elector Palatine (d. 1632)
- August 18 – Jean Bolland, Belgian Jesuit, Founder of the Bollandist (d. 1665)
- August 19 – Elizabeth Stuart, later Queen of Bohemia (d. 1662)
- September
  - James Shirley, English dramatist (d. 1666)
  - Moses Amyraut, French Protestant theologian (d. 1664)
- September 3 – Nicola Amati, Italian luthier from Cremona (d. 1684)
- September 4 – Constantijn Huygens, Dutch Golden Age poet and composer (d. 1687)
- September 7 – John Casimir, Prince of Anhalt-Dessau (d. 1660)
- September 11 – Francis Eaton, Mayflower passenger and New World colonist (d. 1633)
- September 23 – Joan Blaeu, Dutch cartographer (d. 1673)
- October 1 – Cesare Dandini, Italian painter (d. 1657)
- October 5 – Pieter van Mierevelt, Dutch painter (d. 1623)
- October 18 – Edward Winslow, American Pilgrim leader (d. 1655)
- October 23 – Daniel Hay du Chastelet de Chambon, French mathematician (d. 1671)
- October 26 – Robert Coe, American colonial (d. 1689)
- November 1
  - Albert, Count of Nassau-Dillenburg, joint ruler of Nassau-Dillenburg 1623–1626 (d. 1626)
  - Pietro da Cortona, Italian painter (d. 1669)
- November 5 – Charles II, Duke of Elbeuf, French noble (d. 1657)
- November 6 – Jeanne Chezard de Matel, French mystic (d. 1670)
- November 21 – René de Voyer de Paulmy d'Argenson, French politician (d. 1651)
- December 12 – Sir Edward Osborne, 1st Baronet, English politician (d. 1647)
- December 13 – António Luís de Meneses, 1st Marquis of Marialva, Portuguese general and noble (d. 1675)
- December 21
  - Thomas Francis, Prince of Carignano (d. 1656)
  - Peter Mohyla, Moldavian Orthodox Metropolitan of Kiev and Galicia (d. 1646)
- December 24 – Leonaert Bramer, Dutch painter (d. 1674)
- Francesco Buonamici, Italian architect, painter and engraver (d. 1677)
- John Dury, Scottish-born Calvinist minister (d. 1680)
- Franz von Hatzfeld, Prince-Bishop of Würzburg (d. 1642)
- Lucas Holstenius, German humanist (d. 1661)
- Georg Jenatsch, Swiss political leader (d. 1639)
- Richard Mather, American clergyman (d. 1669)
- Horio Tadaharu, Japanese warlord (d. 1633)
- Pocahontas, Algonquian (Native American) princess (d. 1617)

1597

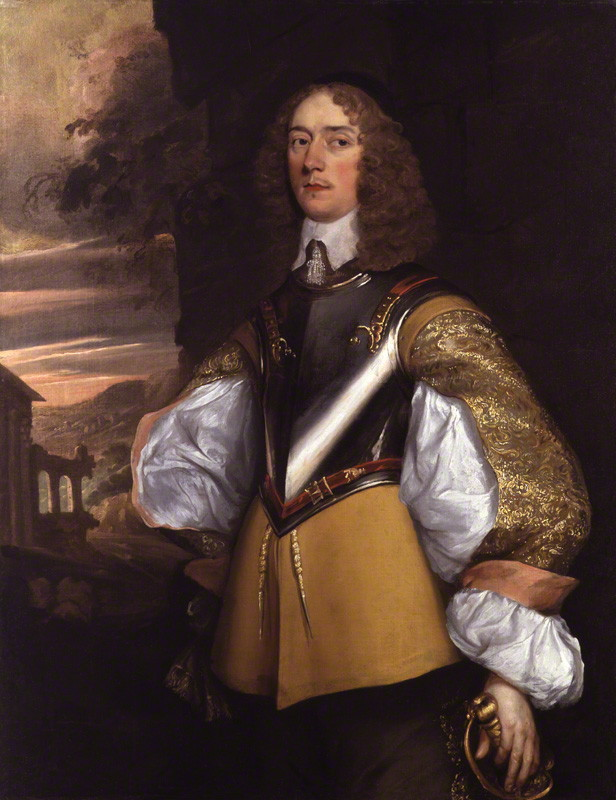
Henry Gage

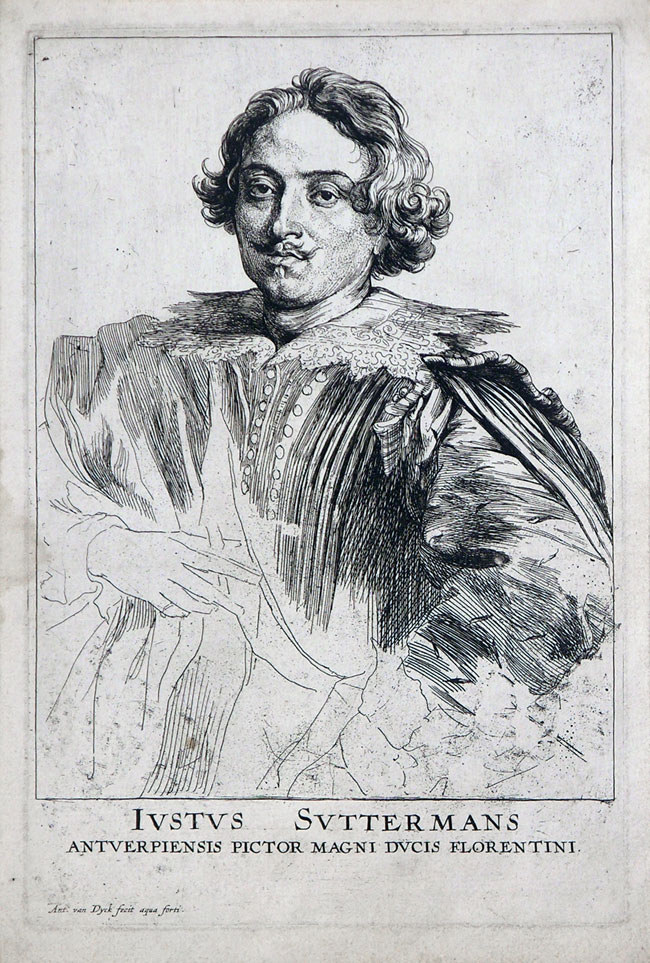
Justus Sustermans

- January 12 – François Duquesnoy, Flemish Baroque sculptor in Rome (d. 1643)
- January 25 – Johann Philipp, Duke of Saxe-Altenburg, German Duke (d. 1639)
- January 31 – John Francis Regis, French Jesuit priest (d. 1640)
- February 24 – Vincent Voiture, French poet (d. 1648)
- March 1 – Jean-Charles de la Faille, Belgian mathematician (d. 1652)
- March 10 – Ercole Gennari, Italian drawer and painter (d. 1658)
- March 18 – Jérôme le Royer de la Dauversière, French nobleman, founder of Montreal and an order of nursing Sisters (d. 1659)
- March 21 – Juan Alonso y Ocón, Spanish Catholic prelate, Archbishop of La Plata o Charcas (d. 1656)
- March 27 – William Hyde, President of English College, Douai (d. 1651)
- April 9 – John Davenport, English Puritan clergyman, co-founder of the American colony of New Haven (d. 1670)
- April 13 – Giovanni Battista Hodierna, Italian astronomer (d. 1660)
- April 23 – Alvise Contarini, Italian diplomat, nobleman (d. 1651)
- May 13 – Cornelis Schut, Flemish painter, draughtsman and engraver (d. 1655)
- May 15 – Squire Bence, English politician (d. 1648)
- May 25 – Veit Erbermann, German theologian (d. 1675)
- May 31 – Jean-Louis Guez de Balzac, French author (d. 1654)
- June 9 – Pieter Jansz. Saenredam, Dutch painter (d. 1665)
- July 2 – Theodoor Rombouts, Flemish painter (d. 1637)
- July 13 – Sebastian Stoskopff, French painter (d. 1657)
- July 22 – Virgilio Mazzocchi, Italian Baroque composer (d. 1646)
- July 29 – Abdias Treu, German mathematician and academic (d. 1669)
- August 20
  - Girolamo Grimaldi-Cavalleroni, Italian Catholic cardinal (d. 1685)
  - Józef Bartłomiej Zimorowic, Polish poet (d. 1677)
- August 21 – Roger Twysden, English antiquarian and royalist (d. 1672)
- August 29 – Henry Gage, Royalist officer in the English Civil War (d. 1645)
- September 23 – Francesco Barberini, Italian Catholic cardinal (d. 1679)
- September 28 – Justus Sustermans, Flemish painter (d. 1681)
- October 7 – Captain John Underhill, English settler and soldier (d. 1672)
- October 13 – Otto Louis of Salm-Kyrburg-Mörchingen, Swedish general in the Thirty Years' War (d. 1634)
- October 20 – Matthew Hutton, English politician (d. 1666)
- November 15 – Juan Tellez-Girón y Enriquez de Ribera, 4th Duke of Osuna (d. 1656)
- November 19 – Elizabeth Charlotte of the Palatinate, wife of George William, Elector of Brandenburg (d. 1660)
- December 16
  - George Albert I, Count of Erbach-Schönberg (d. 1647)
  - Pieter de Neyn, Dutch painter (d. 1639)
- December 22 – Frederick III, Duke of Holstein-Gottorp (d. 1659)
- December 23
  - Martin Opitz, German poet (d. 1639)
- December 24 – Honoré II, Prince of Monaco (d. 1662)
- Cristóbal Diatristán de Acuña, Spanish missionary and explorer (d. 1676)
- Johan van Heemskerk, Dutch poet (d. 1656)
- Cornelis Jol, Dutch naval commander and privateer (d. 1641)
- Wang Wei, Chinese poet (d. 1647)

1598

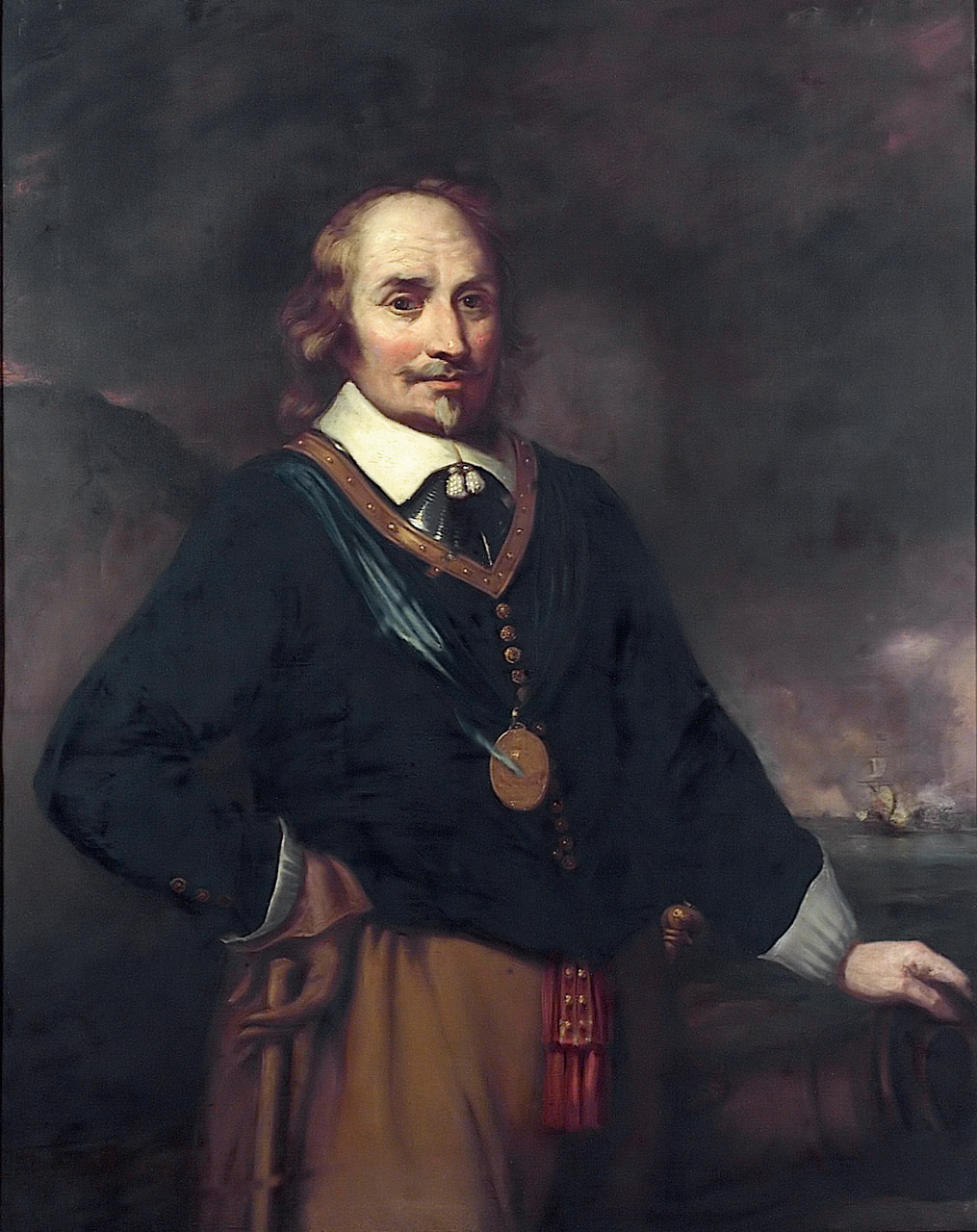
Maarten Tromp

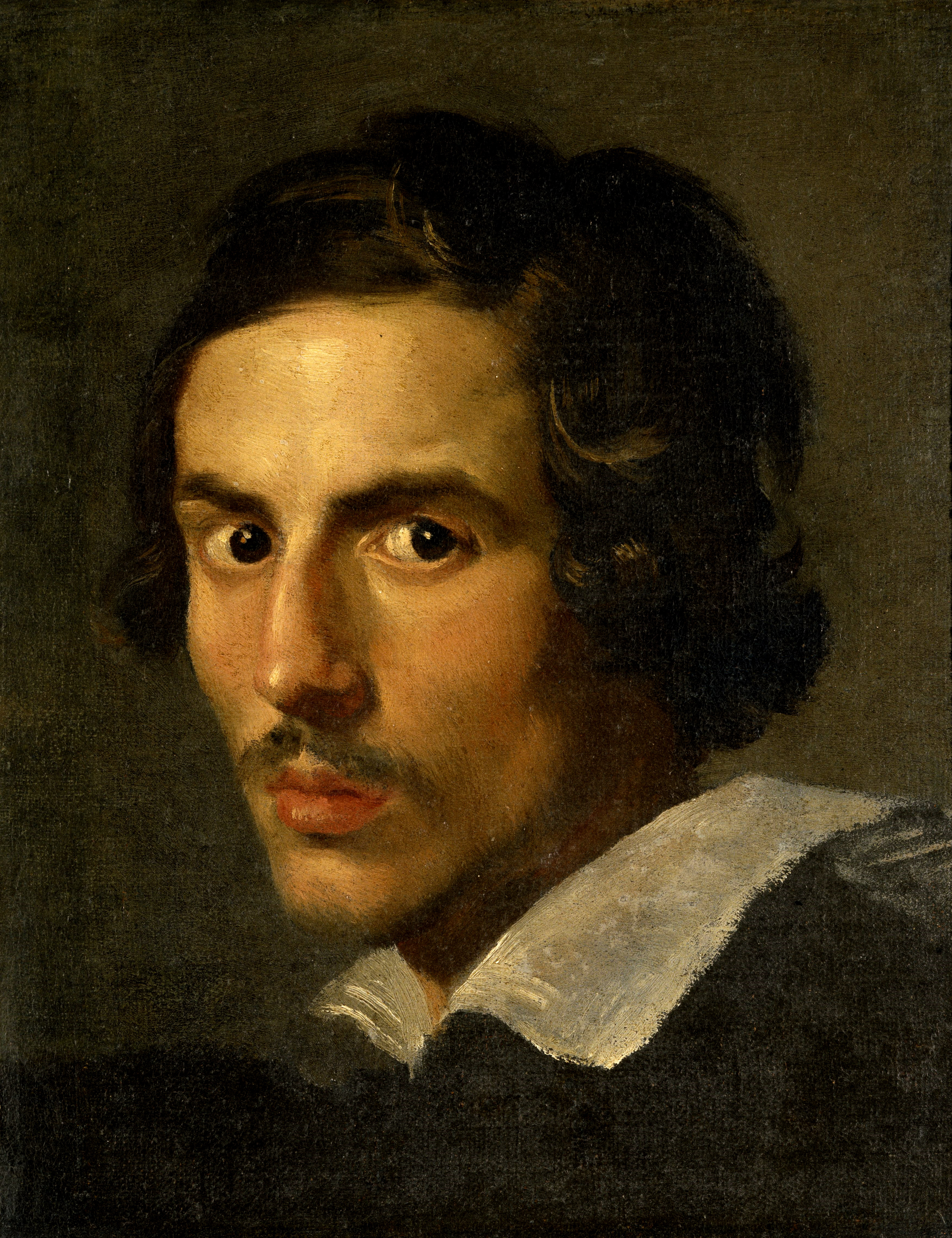
Gian Lorenzo Bernini

- January 23 – François Mansart, French architect (d. 1666)
- March 12 – Guillaume Colletet, French writer (d. 1659)
- March 13 – Johannes Loccenius, German historian (d. 1677)
- March 15 – Redemptus of the Cross, Portuguese Carmelite lay brother and martyr (d. 1638)
- March 25
  - Ralph Corbie, Irish Jesuit (d. 1644)
  - Robert Trelawney, English politician (d. 1643)
- March 26 – Sir William Lewis, 1st Baronet, English politician (d. 1677)
- April 9 – Johann Crüger, German composer of well-known hymns (d. 1662)
- April 11 – William, Duke of Saxe-Weimar, German nobleman (d. 1662)
- April 17 – Giovanni Battista Riccioli, Italian astronomer (d. 1671)
- April 23 – Maarten Tromp, officer and later admiral in the Dutch navy (d. 1653)
- April 28 – Francis Leigh, 1st Earl of Chichester, English politician (d. 1653)
- May 23 – Claude Mellan, French painter and engraver (d. 1688)
- June 4 – Åke Henriksson Tott, Swedish soldier and politician (d. 1640)
- June 19 – Gilbert Sheldon, Archbishop of Canterbury from 1663 until his death (d. 1677)
- July 6 – Kirsten Munk, Danish noble, spouse of King Christian IV of Denmark (d. 1658)
- July 29 – Henricus Regius, Dutch philosopher (d. 1679)
- July 31 – Alessandro Algardi, Italian high-Baroque sculptor active in Rome (d. 1654)
- August 7 – Georg Stiernhielm, Swedish civil servant (d. 1672)
- September 11 – Imre Thurzó, Hungarian noble (d. 1621)
- September 23 – Eleonora Gonzaga, Holy Roman Empress, married to Ferdinand II, Holy Roman Emperor (d. 1655)
- September 24 – Giovanni Francesco Busenello, Italian librettist (d. 1659)
- September 27 – Robert Blake, English admiral (d. 1657)
- October 14 – Nicolas de Neufville de Villeroy, Marshal of France (d. 1685)
- October 17 – Jørgen Knudsen Urne, Danish noble (d. 1642)
- October 19 – Isaac Commelin, Dutch historian (d. 1676)
- October 27 – Lars Stigzelius, Swedish Lutheran archbishop (d. 1676)
- November 3 – Christian I, Count Palatine of Birkenfeld-Bischweiler (1600–1654) (d. 1654)
- November 4 – Ernst Adalbert of Harrach, Austrian Catholic cardinal (d. 1667)
- November 7 – Francisco de Zurbarán, Spanish painter (d. 1664)
- November 28 – Hans Nansen, Danish statesman (d. 1667)
- December 7 – Gian Lorenzo Bernini, Italian sculptor (d. 1680)
- December 20 – Ottavio Farnese, Italian noble (d. 1643)
- December 22 – Henri de La Trémoille, French general and noble (d. 1674)
- December 24 – Margaret Stuart, Scottish princess (d. 1600)
- Bonaventura Cavalieri, Italian mathematician (d. 1647)
- Marmaduke Langdale, Royalist in the English Civil War (d. 1661)
- Baldassarre Longhena, Venetian architect (d. 1682)
- Jean Nicolet, French explorer (d. 1642)
- William Strode, English parliamentarian (d. 1645)
- Guðríður Símonardóttir, Icelandic woman known as a victim of the Turkish abductions (d. 1693)
- probable
  - Jean-Armand du Peyrer, Comte de Tréville and French officer (d. 1672)
  - Mary Bankes, Royalist in the English Civil War, defender of Corfe Castle (d. 1661)

1599

Saint John Berchmans

- January 22 – Robert Petre, 3rd Baron Petre, English baron (d. 1638)
- January 31 – Juraj V Zrinski, Ban of Croatia (d. 1626)
- February 12
  - Duke Friedrich of Saxe-Altenburg, third son of Duke Friedrich Wilhelm I of Saxe-Weimar (d. 1625)
  - Thomas Whitmore, English lawyer and politician who sat in the House of Commons (d. 1677)
- February 13 – Pope Alexander VII (d. 1667)
- March 1 – John Mennes, English Royal Navy admiral (d. 1671)
- March 3 – Juan Alfonso Enríquez de Cabrera, Viceroy of Sicily and Viceroy of Naples (d. 1647)
- March 13 – John Berchmans, Belgian Jesuit scholastic and saint (d. 1621)
- March 22 – Anthony van Dyck, Flemish painter (d. 1641)
- March 23 – Thomas Selle, German baroque composer (d. 1663)
- March 28 – Witte de With, famous Dutch naval officer of the 17th century (d. 1658)

Oliver Cromwell

- April 9 – Sir Thomas Mauleverer, 1st Baronet (d. 1655)
- April 17 – Patrick Fleming, Irish Franciscan friar and scholar (murdered) (d. 1631)
- April 25 – Oliver Cromwell, Lord Protector of England, Scotland, and Ireland (d. 1658)
- May 16 – Nicolaes Olycan, Dutch businessman (d. 1639)
- May 30 – Samuel Bochart, French Protestant biblical scholar (d. 1667)
- June 1 – Elizabeth Lucretia, Duchess of Cieszyn, Duchess suo jure of Cieszyn (d. 1653)
- June 6 – Diego Velázquez, Spanish painter (d. 1660)
- June 24 – Konoe Nobuhiro, Japanese court noble (d. 1649)
- July 23 – Stephanius, Danish historian (d. 1650)
- July 27 – Albert IV, Duke of Saxe-Eisenach (1640–1644) (d. 1644)
- August 11 – Christian II, Prince of Anhalt-Bernburg (1630–1656) (d. 1656)
- August 13 – Johannes Buxtorf II, Swiss theologian (d. 1664)
- August 14 – Méric Casaubon, English classicist (d. 1671)
- August 16 – Diego López Pacheco, 7th Duke of Escalona, Spanish noble (d. 1653)
- August 22 – Agatha Marie of Hanau, German noblewoman (d. 1636)
- September 7 – Jacob Westerbaen, Dutch poet (d. 1670)
- September 20 – Christian, Duke of Brunswick-Lüneburg-Wolfenbüttel, German Protestant military leader (d. 1626)
- September 24 – Adam Olearius, German scholar (d. 1671)
- September 25 – Francesco Borromini, Swiss sculptor and architect (d. 1667)
- September 30 – Frances Seymour, Duchess of Somerset (d. 1674)
- October 10
  - Samuel Clarke, English writer and priest (d. 1683)
  - Étienne Moulinié, French Baroque composer (d. 1676)
- October 11 – Abraham de Fabert, Marshal of France (d. 1662)
- October 15 – Cornelis de Graeff, Dutch mayor (d. 1664)
- October 28 – Marie of the Incarnation, French foundress of the Ursuline Monastery in Quebec (d. 1672)
- October 31 – Denzil Holles, 1st Baron Holles, English statesman and writer (d. 1680)
- November 5 – Carlo Emanuele Madruzzo, Italian prince-bishop (d. 1658)
- November 11
  - Maria Eleonora of Brandenburg, German princess and queen consort of Sweden (d. 1655)
  - Ottavio Piccolomini, Austrian-Italian field marshal (d. 1656)
- November 13 – Otto Christoph von Sparr, German general (d. 1668)
- November 15 – Werner Rolfinck, German physician, chemist, botanist and philosopher (d. 1673)
- November 29 – Peter Heylin, English ecclesiastic and author of many polemical works (d. 1662)
- November 30 – Andrea Sacchi, Italian painter of High Baroque Classicism (d. 1661)
- December 2
  - Thomas Bruce, 1st Earl of Elgin, Scottish nobleman (d. 1663)
  - Alexander Daniell, sole proprietor of the Manor of Alverton, Cornwall (d. 1668)
- December 11 – Pieter Codde, Dutch painter (d. 1678)
- December 14 – Charles Berkeley, 2nd Viscount Fitzhardinge, English politician (d. 1668)
- December 16 – Jacques Vallée, Sieur Des Barreaux, French poet (d. 1673)
- December 20 – Niels Trolle, Governor General of Norway (d. 1667)
- December 29 – Gabriel Bucelin, German historian (d. 1681)
- John Alden, English settler of Plymouth Colony (d. 1687)
- Stefan Czarniecki, Polish military commander (d. 1665)
- Lucy Hay, Countess of Carlisle, English courtier (d. 1660)
- Charlotte Stanley, Countess of Derby defender of Latham House (d. 1664)
- Jirgalang, Qing Dynasty prince (d. 1655)

== Deaths ==
1590

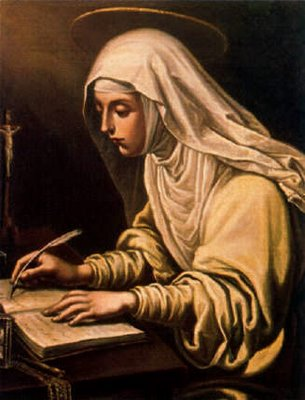
Saint Catherine de Ricci

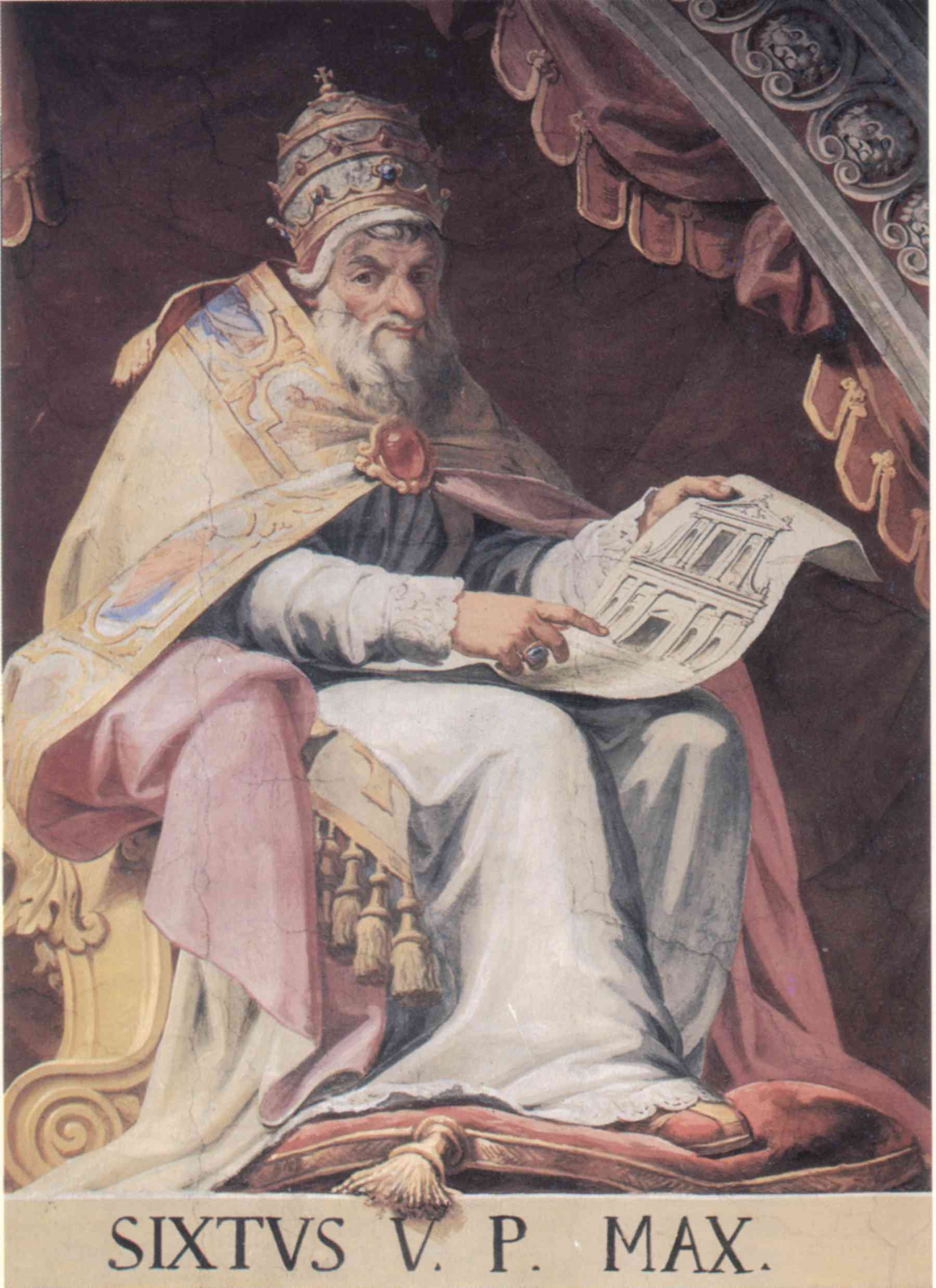
Pope Sixtus V

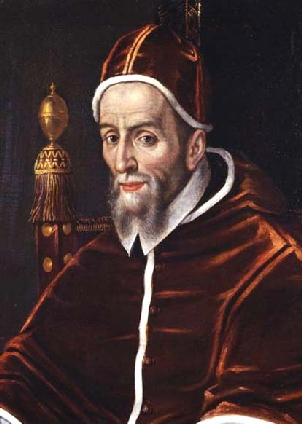
Pope Urban VII

- January 7 – Jakob Andreae, German theologian (b. 1528)
- January 20 – Giambattista Benedetti, Italian mathematician and physicist (b. 1530)
- February 1 – Lawrence Humphrey, president of Magdalen College, Oxford (b. 1527)
- February 2 – Catherine of Ricci, Catholic prioress and saint (b. 1522)
- February 4 – Gioseffo Zarlino, Italian music theorist and composer (b. 1517)
- February 12
  - François Hotman, French Protestant lawyer and writer (b. 1524)
  - Blanche Parry, personal attendant to Elizabeth I of England (b. c. 1508)
- February 18 – Asahi no kata, Japanese lady, Toyotomi Hideyoshi's half-sister (b. 1543)
- February 19 – Philipp IV, Count of Hanau-Lichtenberg (b. 1514)
- February 21 – Ambrose Dudley, 3rd Earl of Warwick, English nobleman and general (b. 1528)
- March 4 – Duchess Hedwig of Württemberg, by marriage countess of Hesse-Marburg (b. 1547)
- April 2 – Elisabeth of Saxony, Countess Palatine of Simmern (b. 1552)
- April 6 – Francis Walsingham, English spymaster (b. 1530)
- May 9 – Charles de Bourbon French cardinal and pretender to the throne (b. 1523)
- June 28 – Hori Hidemasa, Japanese warlord (b. 1553)
- June 30 – Maha Thammaracha (b. 1509)
- July 10 – Charles II, Archduke of Austria, regent of Inner Austria (b. 1540)
- July 21 – Sophie of Württemberg, German noble (b. 1563)
- August 10
  - Hōjō Ujimasa, Japanese warlord (b. 1538)
  - Hōjō Ujiteru, Japanese warlord (b. 1540？)
- August 17 – James III, Margrave of Baden-Hachberg (b. 1562)
- August 27 – Pope Sixtus V (b. 1521)
- September 10 – Archduchess Magdalena of Austria, Member of the House of Habsburg (b. 1532)
- September 13 – Pedro Téllez-Girón, 1st Duke of Osuna, Spanish duke (b. 1537)
- September 20 – Lodovico Agostini, Italian composer (b. 1534)
- September 27 – Pope Urban VII (b. 1521)
- October 4 – Jacques Cujas, French legal expert (b. 1522)
- October 12 – Kanō Eitoku, Japanese painter (b. 1543)
- October 16 – Archduchess Anna of Austria, Duchess of Bavaria (b. 1528)
- October 18 – Philip, Duke of Holstein-Gottorp (b. 1570)
- October 23 – Bernardino de Sahagún, Franciscan missionary (b. 1499)
- October 29 – Dirck Volckertszoon Coornhert, Dutch politician and theologian (b. 1522)
- November 18 – George Talbot, 6th Earl of Shrewsbury, English statesman (b. 1528)
- November 19 – Girolamo Zanchi, Italian theologian (b. 1516)
- November 29 – Philipp Nicodemus Frischlin, German philologist and poet (b. 1547)
- December 20 – Ambroise Paré, French surgeon (b. 1510)
- December 27 – Emanuel Philibert de Lalaing, Belgian noble and army commander (b. 1557)
- Nicholas Bobadilla, one of the first Spanish Jesuits (b. 1511)
- Marietta Robusti, Venetian Renaissance painter (b. 1555 or 1560)
- Roger Dudley, British soldier (b. 1535)
- Sorley Boy MacDonnell, Irish chieftain (b. 1505)
- Juan Bautista de Pomar, Spanish colonial historian and writer
- Catherine Salvaresso, Wallachian regent
- Maddalena Casulana, Italian composer, lutenist and singer (d. 1544)

Bernard Palissy, French potter (b. 1510)

1591

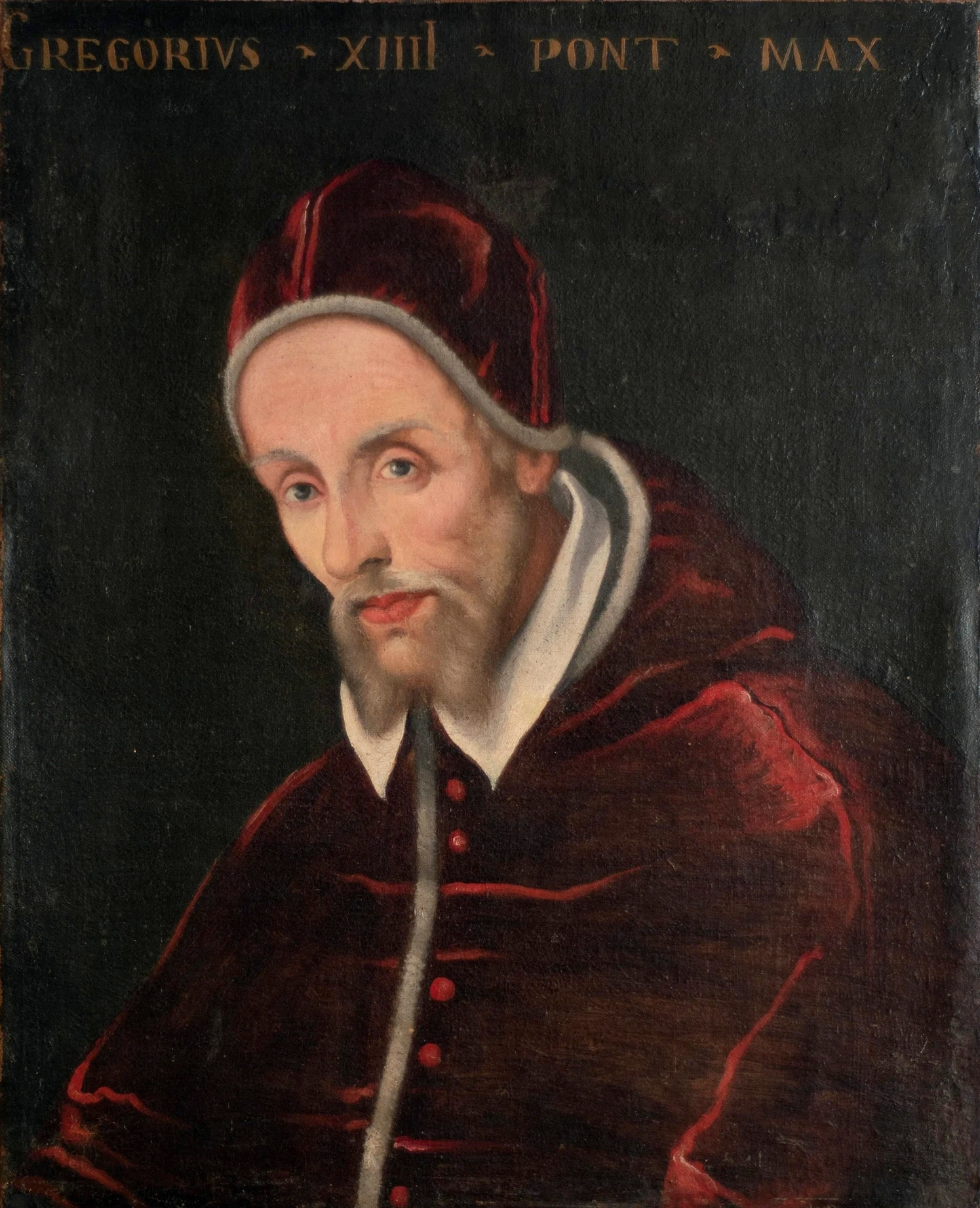
Pope Gregory XIV

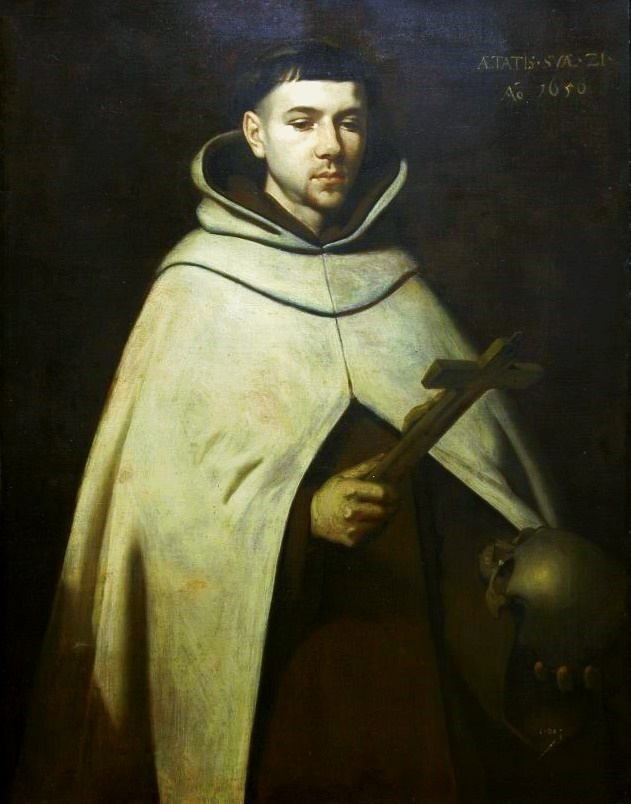
John of the Cross

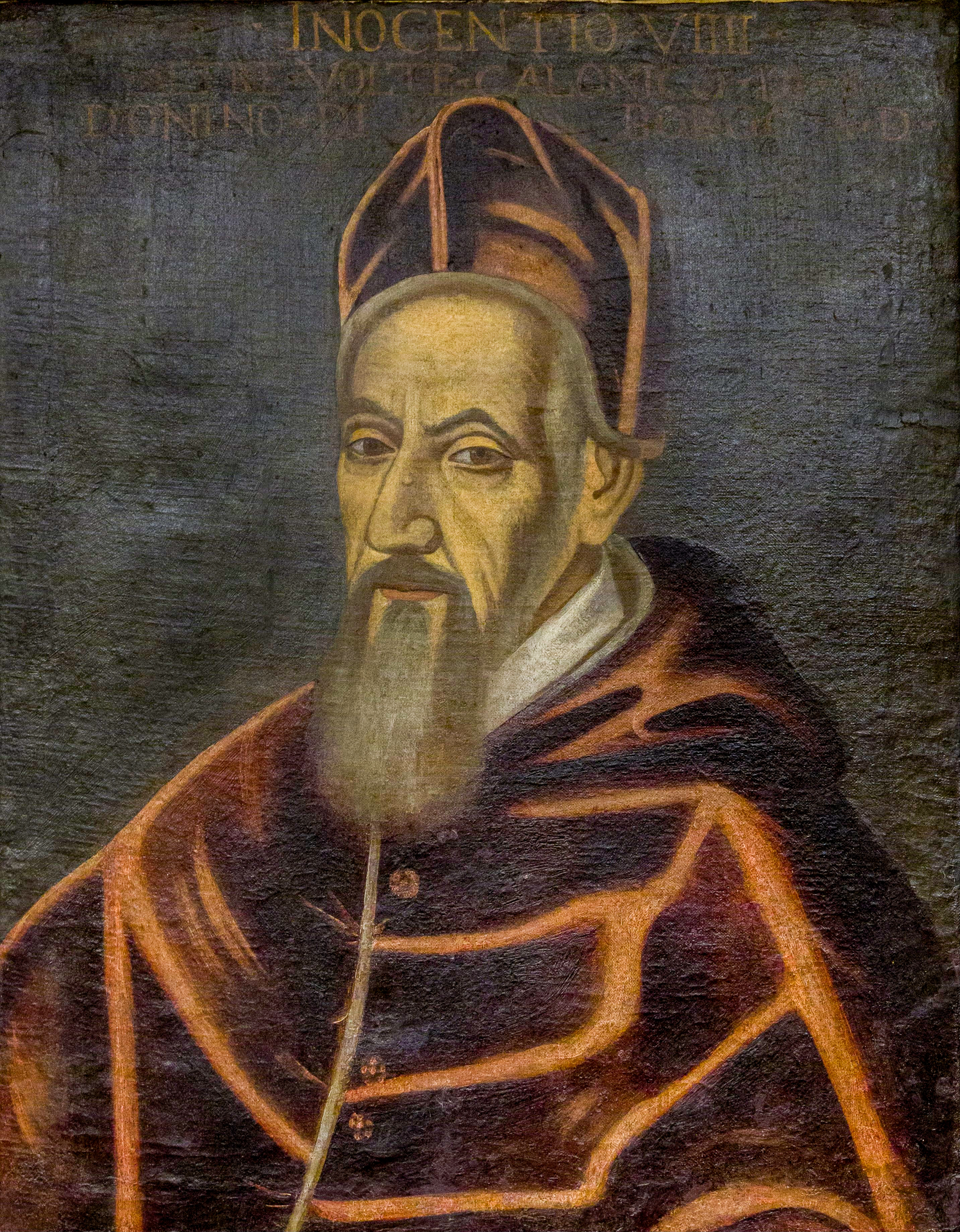
Pope Innocent IX

- February 6 – Anna Sophia of Prussia, Duchess of Prussia and Duchess of Mecklenburg (b. 1527)
- February 15 – Toyotomi Hidenaga, Japanese warlord (b. 1540)
- February 26 – Vespasiano I Gonzaga, Italian noble and diplomat (b. 1531)
- March 17 – Jost Amman, Swiss printmaker (b. 1539)
- April 9 – Emilie of Saxony, German noble (b. 1516)
- April 21 – Sen no Rikyū, Japanese exponent of the tea ceremony (b. 1522)
- May 19 – Elizabeth Cecil, 16th Baroness de Ros, English noblewoman (b. c. 1574)
- May 15 – Tsarevich Dimitri, of Russia (b. 1582)
- June 21 – Aloysius Gonzaga, Italian Jesuit and saint (b. 1568)
- July 2 – Vincenzo Galilei, Italian composer (b. 1520)
- July 10 – Anna of Hesse, Countess Palatine of Zweibrücken (b. 1529)
- July 18 – Jacobus Gallus Carniolus, Slovenian composer (b. 1550)
- August 23 – Luis Ponce de León, Spanish lyric poet (b. 1527)
- August 27 – Katheryn of Berain, Welsh noblewoman (b. 1534)
- September 7 – Heinrich Sudermann, German politician (b. 1520)
- September 10 – Richard Grenville, English soldier and explorer (b. 1542)
- September 19 – Alonso de Orozco Mena, Spanish Catholic priest (b. 1500)
- September 25 – Christian I, Elector of Saxony (b. 1560)
- September 29 – Count Johan II of East Frisia (b. 1538)
- October 15 – Duke Otto Henry of Brunswick-Harburg, Hereditary Prince of Brunswick-Lüneburg-Harburg (b. 1555)
- October 16 – Pope Gregory XIV (b. 1535)
- November 20 – Christopher Hatton, English politician (b. 1540)
- December 14 – Saint John of the Cross, Spanish Carmelite friar and poet (b. 1542)
- December 18 – Marigje Arriens, Dutch woman executed for witchcraft (b. c. 1520)
- December 30 – Pope Innocent IX (b. 1519)
- Ananias Dare, father of Virginia Dare, (b. circa 1560)
- Virginia Dare, first English child born in America, (b. 1587) (Unverified)
- (by February 6) – Crispin van den Broeck, Flemish painter (b. 1523)
- John Erskine of Dun, Scottish religious reformer (b. 1509)
- Veronica Franco, Italian poet and courtesan (b. 1546)

1592

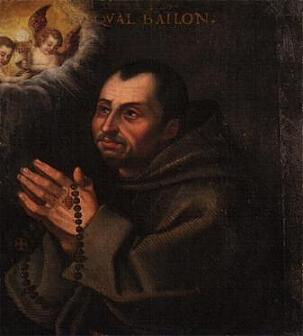
Saint Paschal Baylon died on May 17, 1592

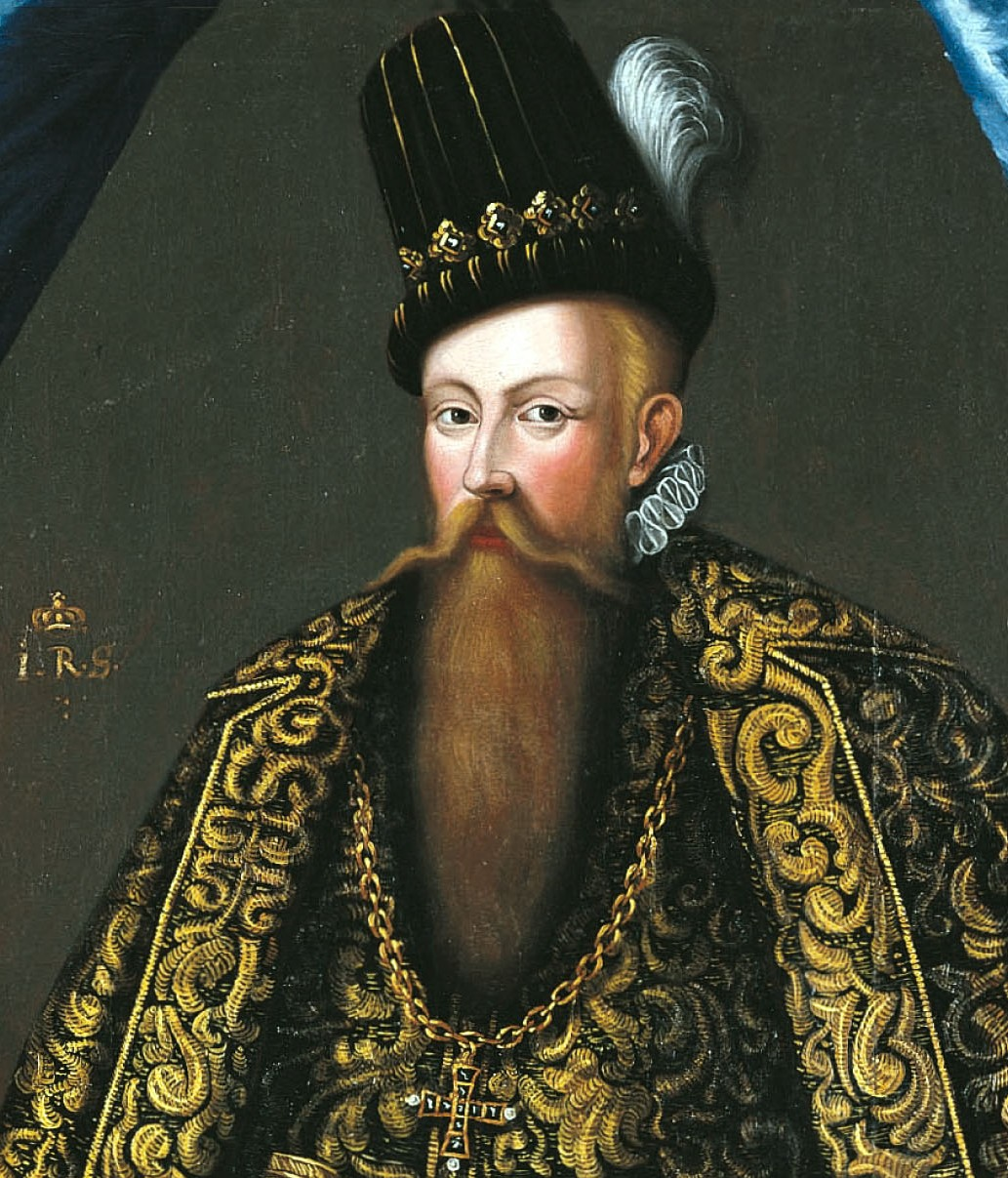
King John III of Sweden died on November 17, 1592

- January 5 – William, Duke of Jülich-Cleves-Berg, German nobleman (b. 1516)
- January 22 – Elisabeth of Austria, Queen of France (b. 1554)
- January 27 – Gian Paolo Lomazzo, Italian painter (b. 1538)
- February 2 – Ana de Mendoza, Princess of Eboli, Spanish noble (b. 1540)
- February 29 – Alessandro Striggio, Italian composer (b. 1540)
- March 4 – Christopher, Duke of Mecklenburg and administrator of Ratzeburg (b. 1537)
- March 5 – Michiel Coxie, Flemish painter (b. 1499)
- March 22 – Johann VII, Duke of Mecklenburg, Duke of Mecklenburg-Schwerin (1576–1592) (b. 1558)
- April 8 – Dorothea Susanne of Simmern, Duchess of Saxe-Weimar (b. 1544)
- April 13 – Bartolomeo Ammannati, Italian architect and sculptor (b. 1511)
- April 18 – George John I, Count Palatine of Veldenz (b. 1543)
- April 21 – Christoph, Count of Hohenzollern-Haigerloch (b. 1552)
- May 17 – Paschal Baylon, Spanish mystic and saint (b. 1540)
- May 24 – Nikolaus Selnecker, German musician (b. 1530)
- June 17 – Ernst Ludwig, Duke of Pomerania (b. 1545)
- July 1 – Marc'Antonio Ingegneri, Italian composer (b. c. 1547)
- July 4 – Francesco Bassano the Younger, Italian painter (b. 1559)
- July 6 – John George of Ohlau, Duke of Oława and Wołów (1586–1592) (b. 1552)
- July 18 – Sibylle of Saxony, Duchess of Saxe-Lauenburg (b. 1515)
- July 22 – Ludwig Rabus, German martyrologist (b. 1523)
- July 26 – Armand de Gontaut, baron de Biron, French soldier (b. 1524)
- August 20 – William the Younger, Duke of Brunswick-Lüneburg (b. 1535)
- August 25
  - William IV, Landgrave of Hesse-Kassel (or Hesse-Cassel) (b. 1532)
  - Shimazu Toshihisa, Japanese samurai (b. 1537)
- September 3 – Robert Greene, English writer (b. 1558)
- September 13 – Michel de Montaigne, French essayist (b. 1533)
- September 20 – Francisco Vallés, Spanish physician (b. 1524)
- October 15 – Jean Vendeville, law professor, Roman Catholic bishop (b. 1527)
- October 19 – Anthony Browne, 1st Viscount Montagu, English politician (b. 1528)
- October 28 – Ogier Ghiselin de Busbecq, Flemish diplomat (b. 1522)
- November 17 – King John III of Sweden (b. 1537)
- November 27 – Nakagawa Hidemasa, Japanese military commander (b. 1568)
- December 3 – Alexander Farnese, Duke of Parma (b. 1545)
- Date unknown
  - Moderata Fonte, Italian poet, writer and philosopher (b. 1555)
  - Pedro Sarmiento de Gamboa, Spanish explorer (b. 1532)
  - Katharina Gerlachin, German printer (b. 1520)
  - Girolamo Muziano, Italian painter (b. 1532)

1593

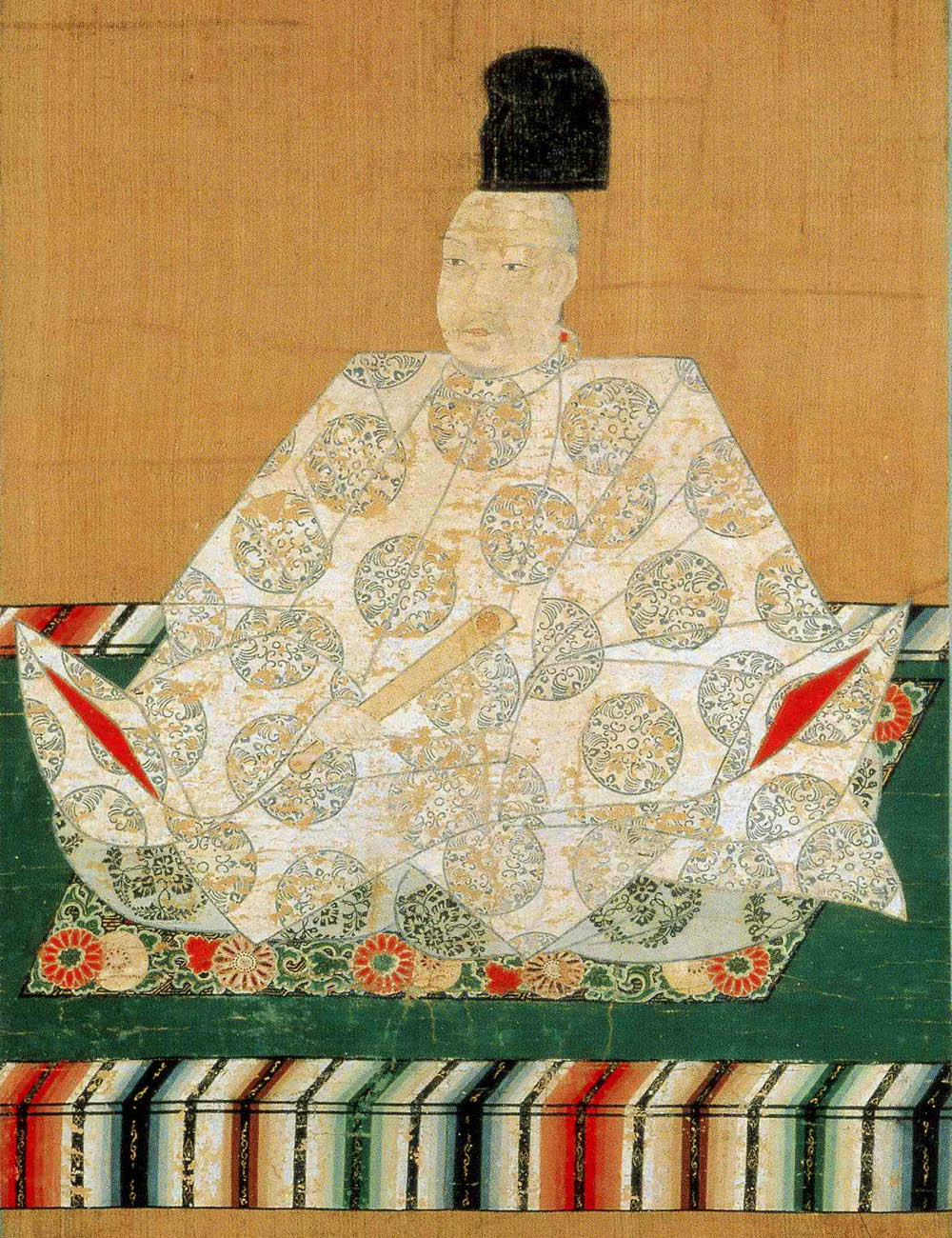
Emperor Ogimachi

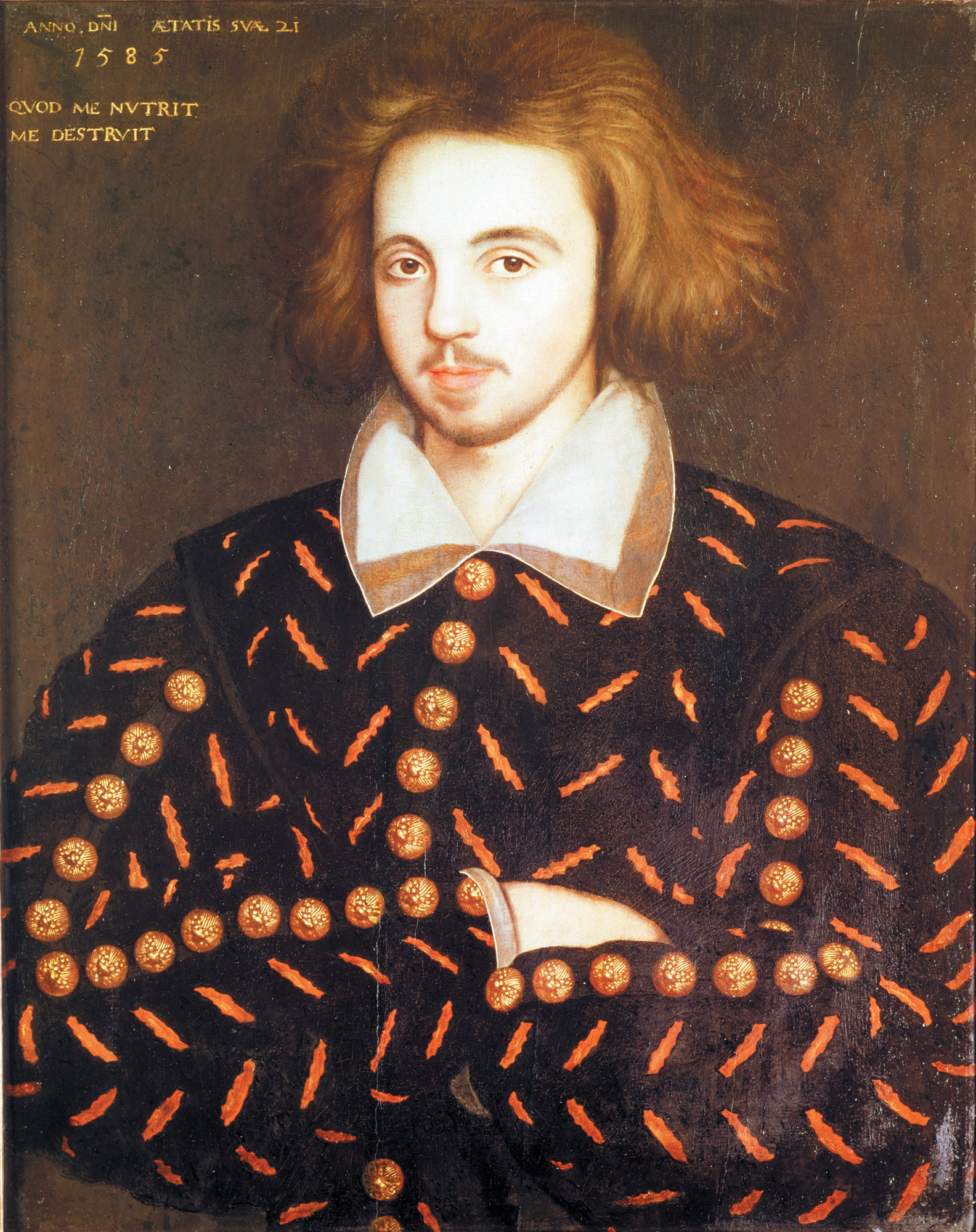
The Marlowe portrait, often claimed to be Christopher Marlowe, playwright

- January 8 – Mingyi Swa, Burmese crown prince (b. 1558)
- January 11 – Scipione Gonzaga, Italian Catholic cardinal (b. 1542)
- February 6
  - Jacques Amyot, French writer (b. 1513)
  - Emperor Ōgimachi of Japan (b. 1517)
- March 8 – Paul Luther, German scientist (b. 1533)
- March 23 – Henry Barrowe, English Puritan and separatist (b. 1550)
- April 6 – John Greenwood, English Puritan and separatist (hanged) (b. 1556)
- April 24 – William Harrison, English clergyman (b. 1534)
- May 29 – John Penry, Welsh Protestant (hanged) (b. 1559)
- May 30 – Christopher Marlowe, English poet and playwright (murdered) (b. 1564)
- June 3 – Katarina Bengtsdotter Gylta, Swedish abbess (b. 1520)
- June 25 – Michele Mercati, Italian physician and botanist (b. 1541)
- July 4 – Min Phalaung, Burmese monarch (b. 1535)
- July 11 – Giuseppe Arcimboldo, Italian painter (b. 1526)
- September 5 – Andreas von Auersperg, Carniolan noble and military commander in the battle of Sisak (b. 1556)
- September 25 – Henry Stanley, 4th Earl of Derby, English nobleman, diplomat and politician (b. 1531)
- October 25 – Gómez Pérez Dasmariñas, Spanish colonial administrator (murdered) (b. 1519)
- November 11 – Albert, Count of Nassau-Weilburg (b. 1537)
- November 20 – Hans Bol, Flemish artist (b. 1534)
- date unknown
  - Jeong Cheol, Korean administrator and poet (b. 1536)
  - Krzysztof Kosiński, Polish noble (b. 1545)
  - Li Shizhen, Chinese physician, pharmacologist, and mineralogist (b. 1518)

1594

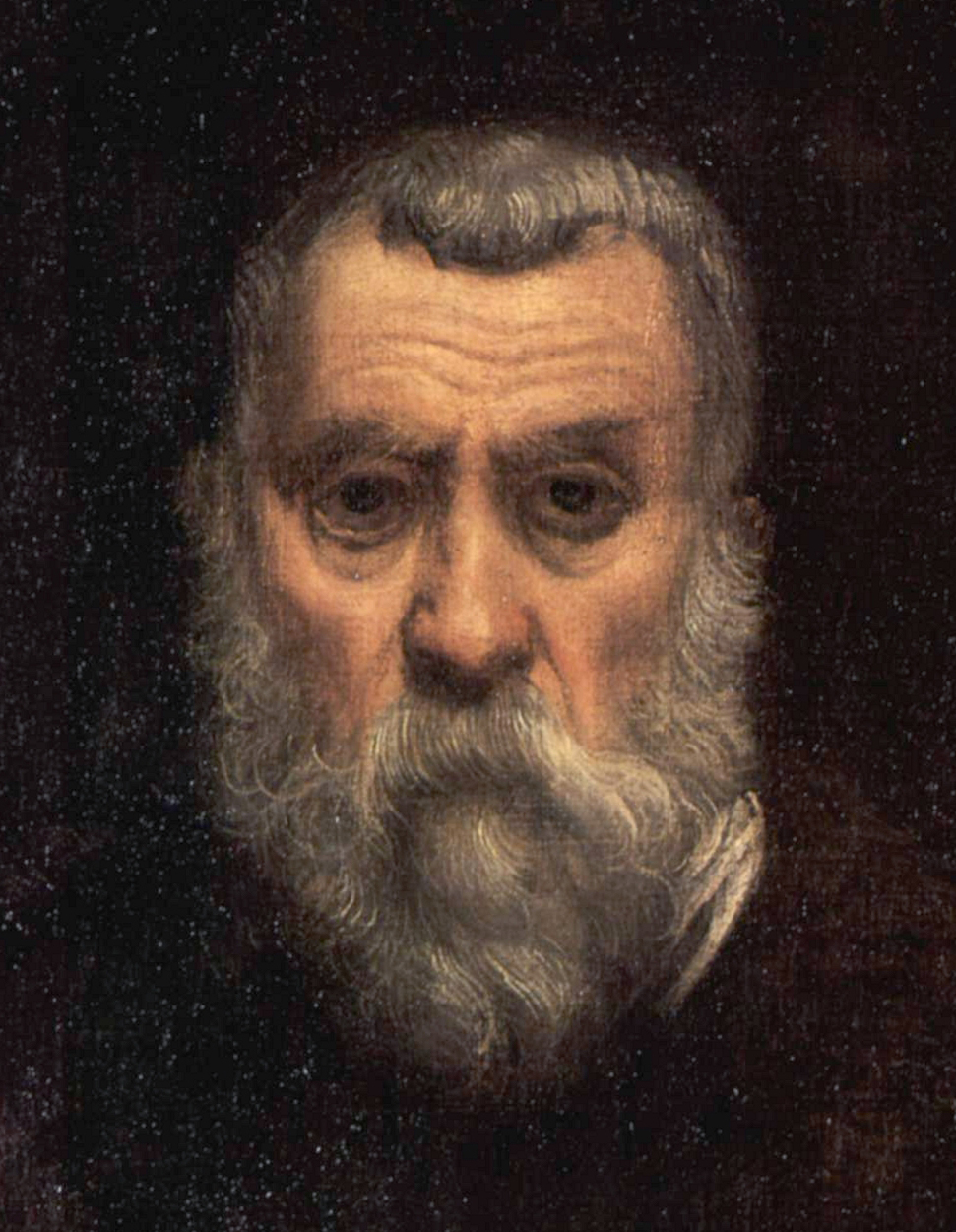
Tintoretto

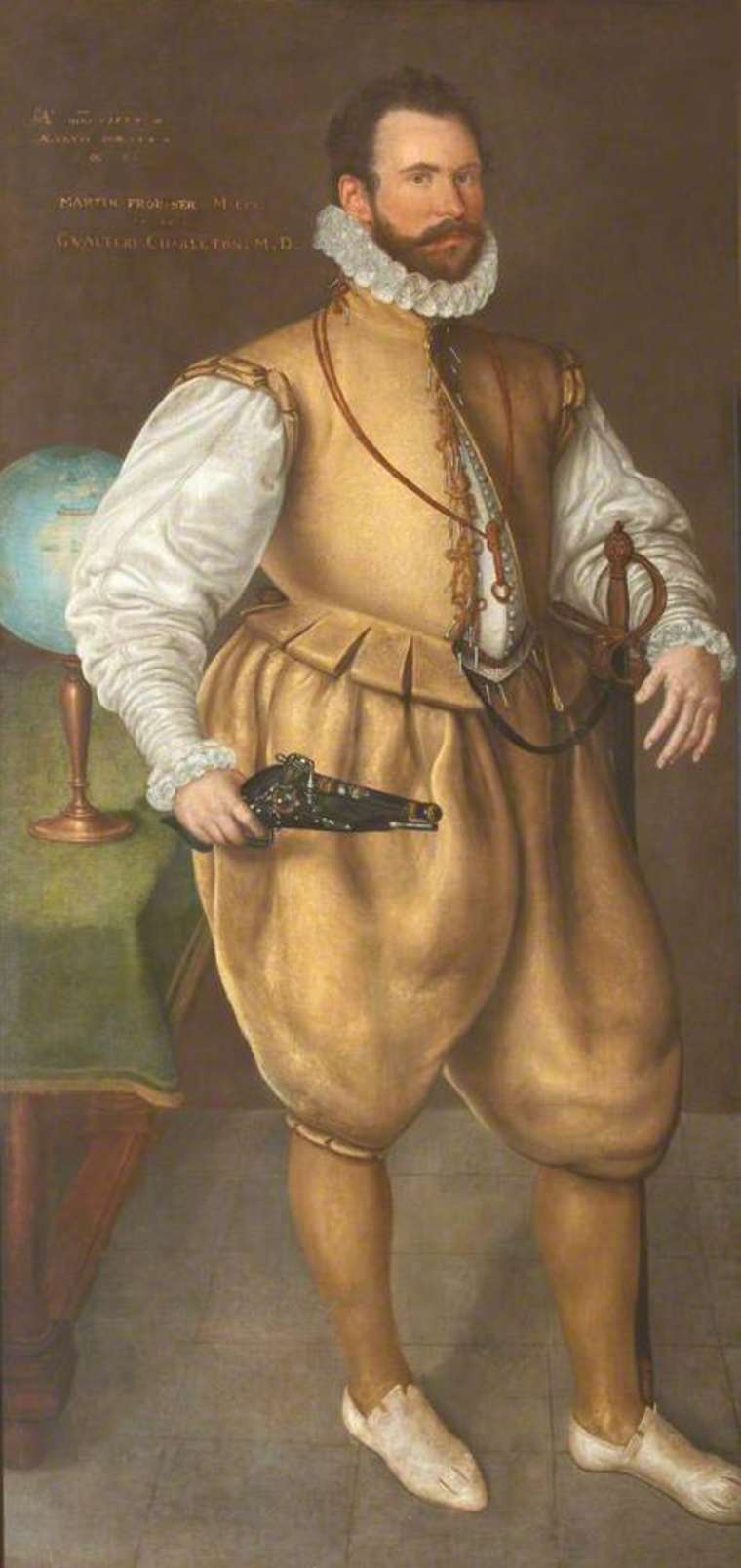
Martin Frobisher

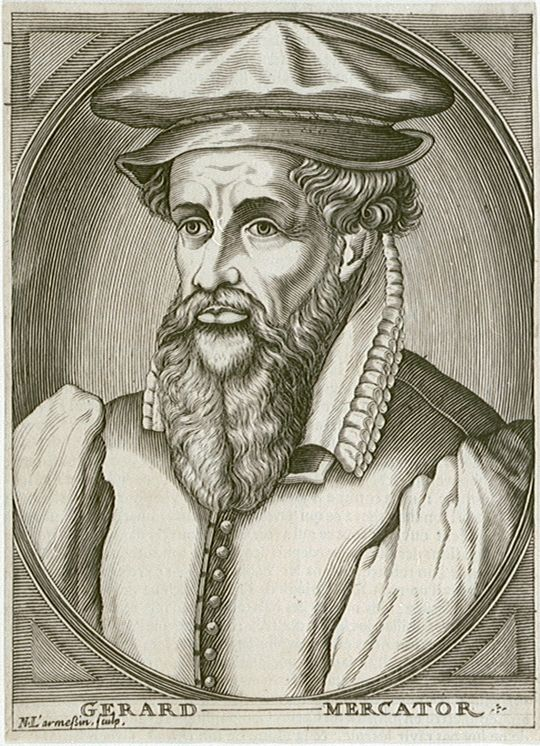
Gerardus Mercator

- February – Barnabe Googe, English poet (b. 1540)
- February 2 – Giovanni Pierluigi da Palestrina, Italian composer (b. 1525)
- February 8 – Countess Palatine Elisabeth of Simmern-Sponheim, Duchess of Saxony (b. 1540)
- April 16 – Ferdinando Stanley, 5th Earl of Derby (b. 1559), second in line to the throne of England
- April 29 – Thomas Cooper, English bishop, lexicographer, and writer (b. c. 1517)
- May 2 – Edward Atslowe, English physician
- May 15 – Charlotte de La Marck, French duchess (b. 1574)
- May 30 – Bálint Balassi, Hungarian writer and noble (b. 1554)
- May 31
  - Tintoretto, Italian painter (b. 1518)
  - Francesco Panigarola, Italian bishop (b. 1548)
- June 3 – John Aylmer, English divine (b. 1521)
- June 7 – Rodrigo Lopez, Queen Elizabeth's physician (executed for treason) (b. 1525)
- June 14 – Orlande de Lassus, Flemish composer (b. 1532)
- June 29 – Niels Kaas, Danish chancellor (b. 1535)
- July – Girolamo Mei, Italian historian and humanist (b. 1519)
- July 10 – Paolo Bellasio, Italian composer and organist (b. 1554)
- August 5 – Archduchess Eleanor of Austria (b. 1534)
- October 8 – Ishikawa Goemon, Japanese ninja and thief (b. 1558)
- October 16 – William Allen, English cardinal (b. 1532)
- November 15 – Sir Martin Frobisher, British explorer (b. 1535)
- November 20 – Gaspar de Quiroga y Vela, General Inquisitor of Spain (b. 1512)
- November 29 – Alonso de Ercilla y Zúñiga, Basque soldier and poet (b. 1533)
- December 2 – Gerardus Mercator, Flemish-German cartographer (b. 1512)
- December 16 – Allison Balfour, alleged Scottish witch
- date unknown
  - John Johnson, English lutenist and composer (b. c. 1545)
  - Thomas Kyd, author of The Spanish Tragedy (b. 1558)

1595

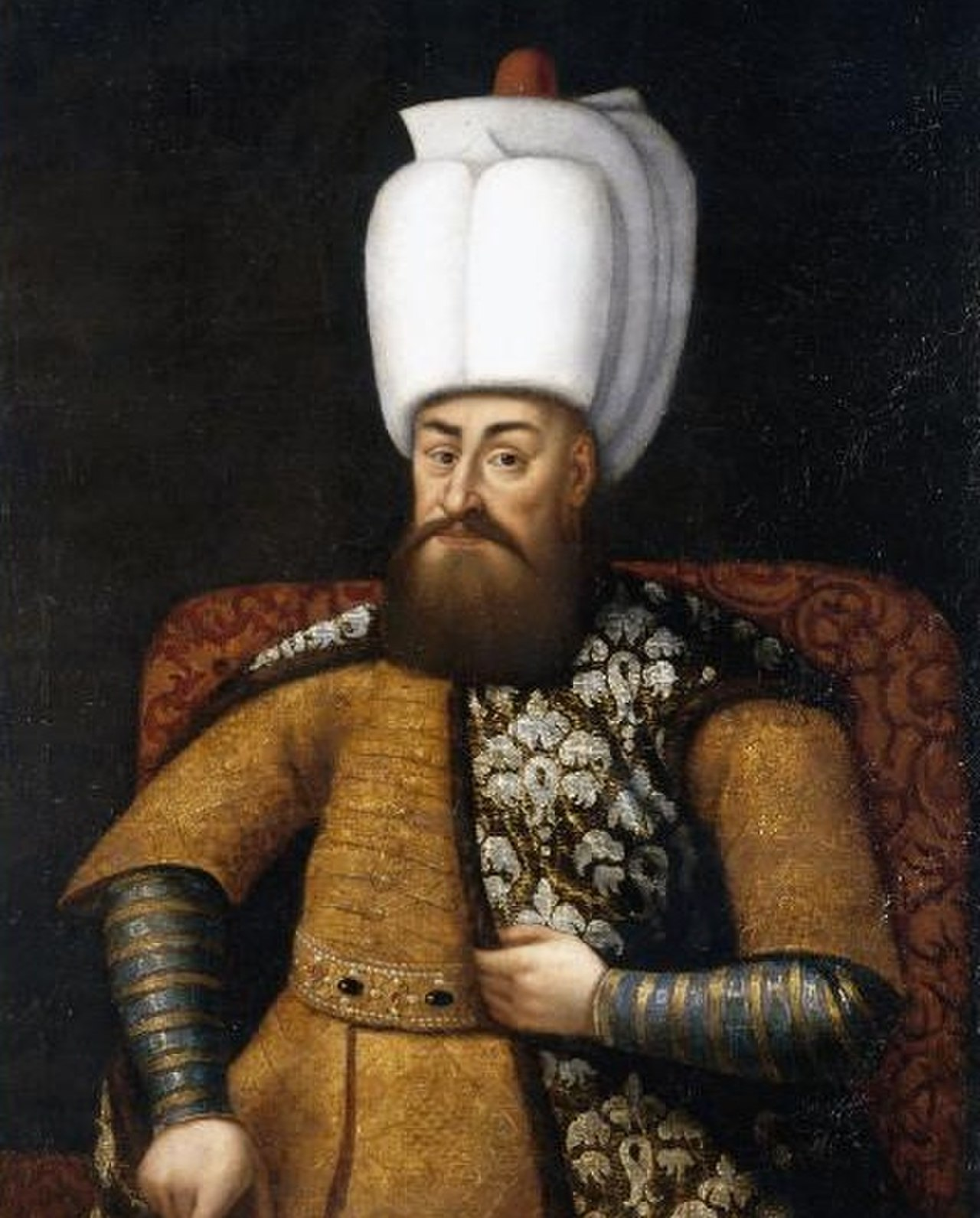
Murad III

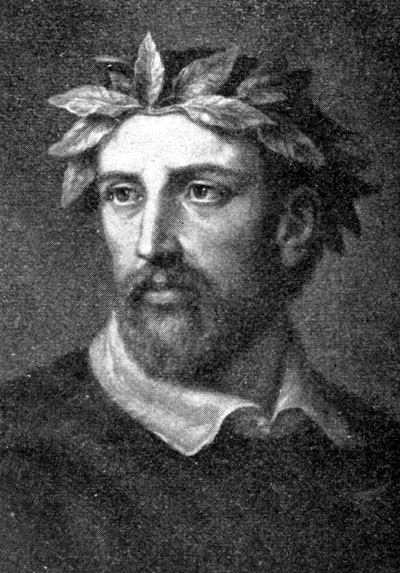
Torquato Tasso

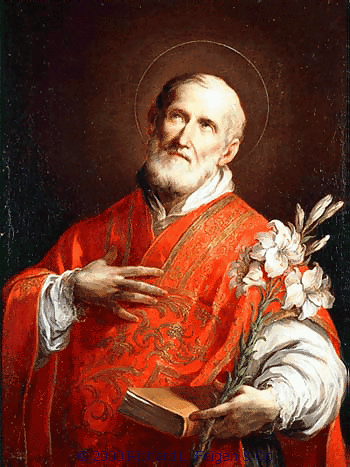
Saint Philip Neri

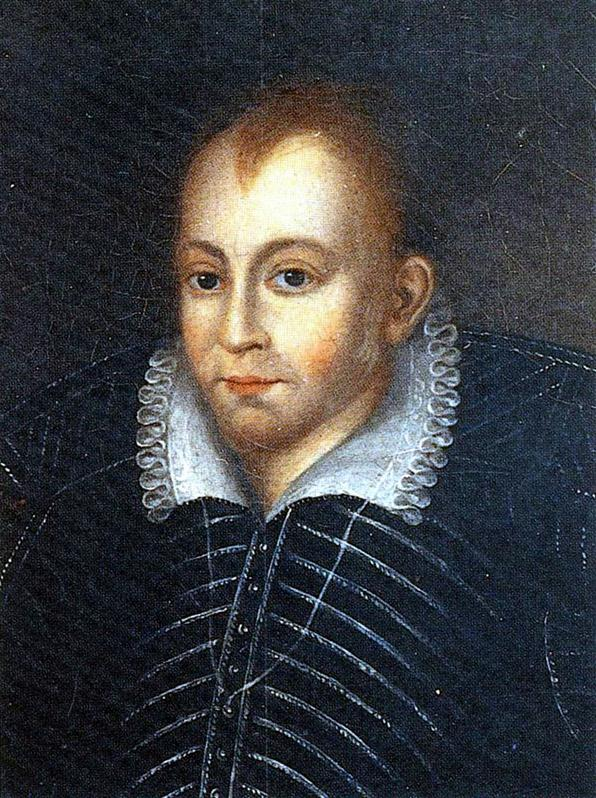
Magnus, Duke of Östergötland

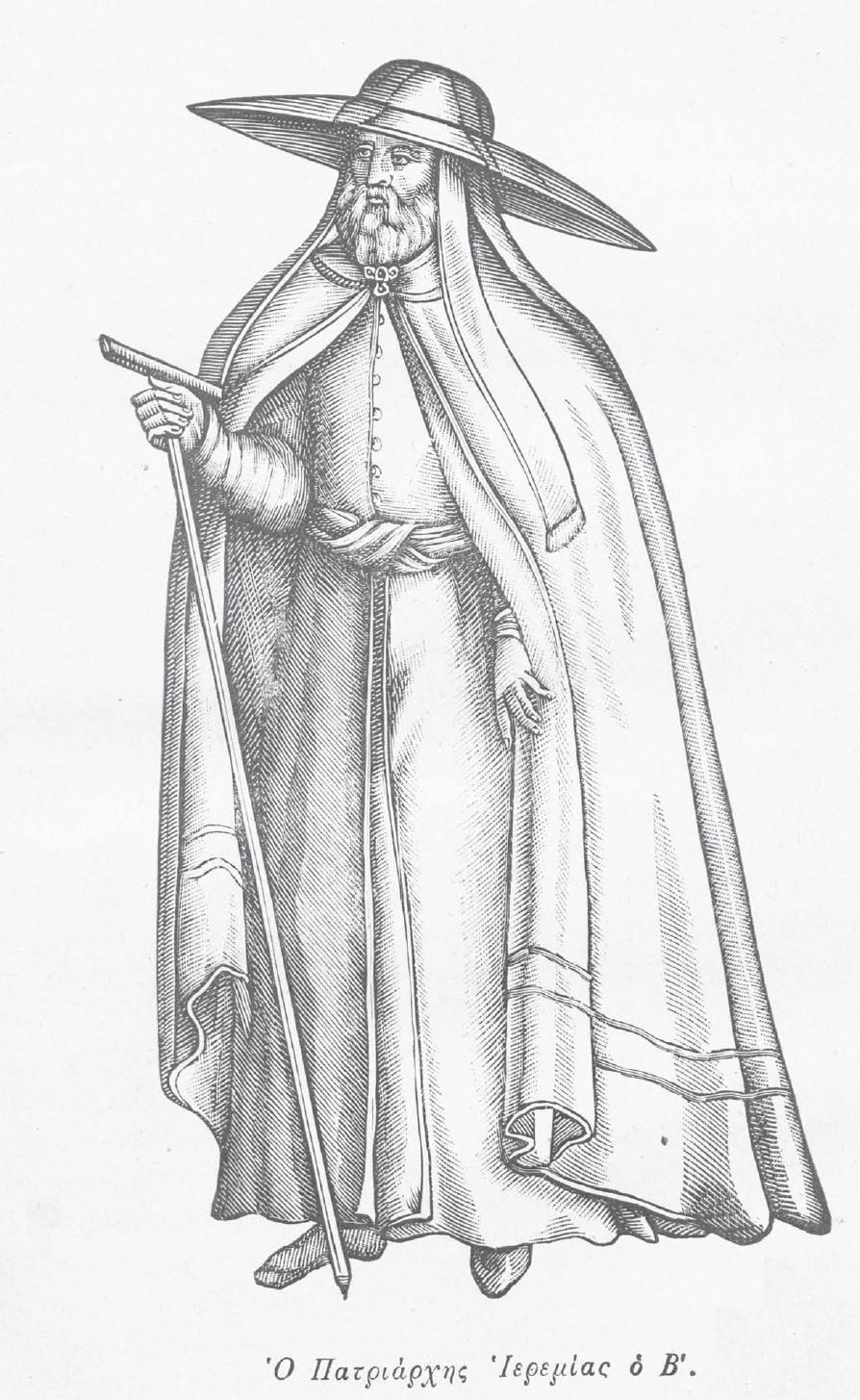
Patriarch Jeremias II of Constantinople

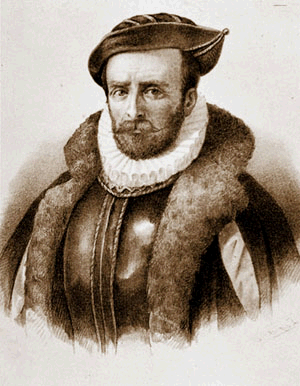
Álvaro de Mendaña de Neira

- January 2 – Barbara of Brandenburg, Duchess of Brieg, German princess (b. 1527)
- January 15 – Murad III, Ottoman Sultan (b. 1546)
- January 24 – Ferdinand II, Archduke of Austria, regent of Tyrol and Further Austria (b. 1529)
- February – William Painter, English translator (b. 1540)
- February 20 – Archduke Ernest of Austria, Governor of the Spanish Netherlands (b. 1553)
- February 21 – Robert Southwell, Jesuit priest and poet (b. 1561)
- April 25 – Torquato Tasso, Italian poet (b. 1544)
- May 4 – Hugues Loubenx de Verdalle, Cardinal and 52nd Grandmaster of the Knights Hospitaller (b. 1531)
- May 14 – Wolfgang, Duke of Brunswick-Grubenhagen (b. 1531)
- May 19 – John Frederick II, Duke of Saxony (b. 1529)
- May 25
  - Valens Acidalius, German critic and poet (b. 1567)
  - Philip Neri, Italian Roman Catholic priest and saint (b. 1515)
- June 23 – Louis Carrion, Flemish humanist and classical scholar (b. 1547)
- June 26 – Magnus, Duke of Östergötland, Swedish prince (b. 1542)
- July 10 – Udai Singh of Marwar, Ruler of Marwar (b. 1538)
- July 23 – Thoinot Arbeau, French priest and author (b. 1519)
- August 24 – Thomas Digges, English astronomer (b. 1546)
- August 26 – Antonio, Prior of Crato, claimant to the throne of Portugal (b. 1531)
- September 3 – Philip of Nassau, Count of Nassau (b. 1566)
- September 4 – Jeremias II of Constantinople (b. 1530)
- October 15 – Faizi, Indo-Persian poet and scholar (b. 1547)
- October 18 – Álvaro de Mendaña de Neira, Spanish navigator and explorer (b. 1542)
- October 19 – Philip Howard, 20th Earl of Arundel, English nobleman (b. 1537)
- October 23 – Louis Gonzaga, Duke of Nevers, Italian-French dignitary and diplomat (b. 1539)
- November 4 – Francesco Cattani da Diacceto, Bishop of Fiesole (b. 1531)
- November 5 – Luis Barahona de Soto, Spanish poet (b. 1548)
- November 12 – John Hawkins, English shipbuilder and trader (b. 1532)
- November 23 – Clara of Brunswick-Wolfenbüttel, Abbess of Gandersheim and Duchess of Brunswick-Grubenhagen (b. 1532)
- December 11 – Philipe de Croÿ, Duke of Aerschot (b. 1526)
- December 14 – Henry Hastings, 3rd Earl of Huntingdon (b. 1535)
- date unknown
  - Grzegorz Branicki, Polish noble (b. 1534)
  - Helena Antonia, court dwarf (b. 1550)
  - Turlough Luineach O'Neill, Irish chief of Tyrone (b. c. 1530)
  - Robert Sempill, Scottish ballad-writer (b. 1530)
  - Thomas Whythorne, English author and musician (b. 1528)

1596

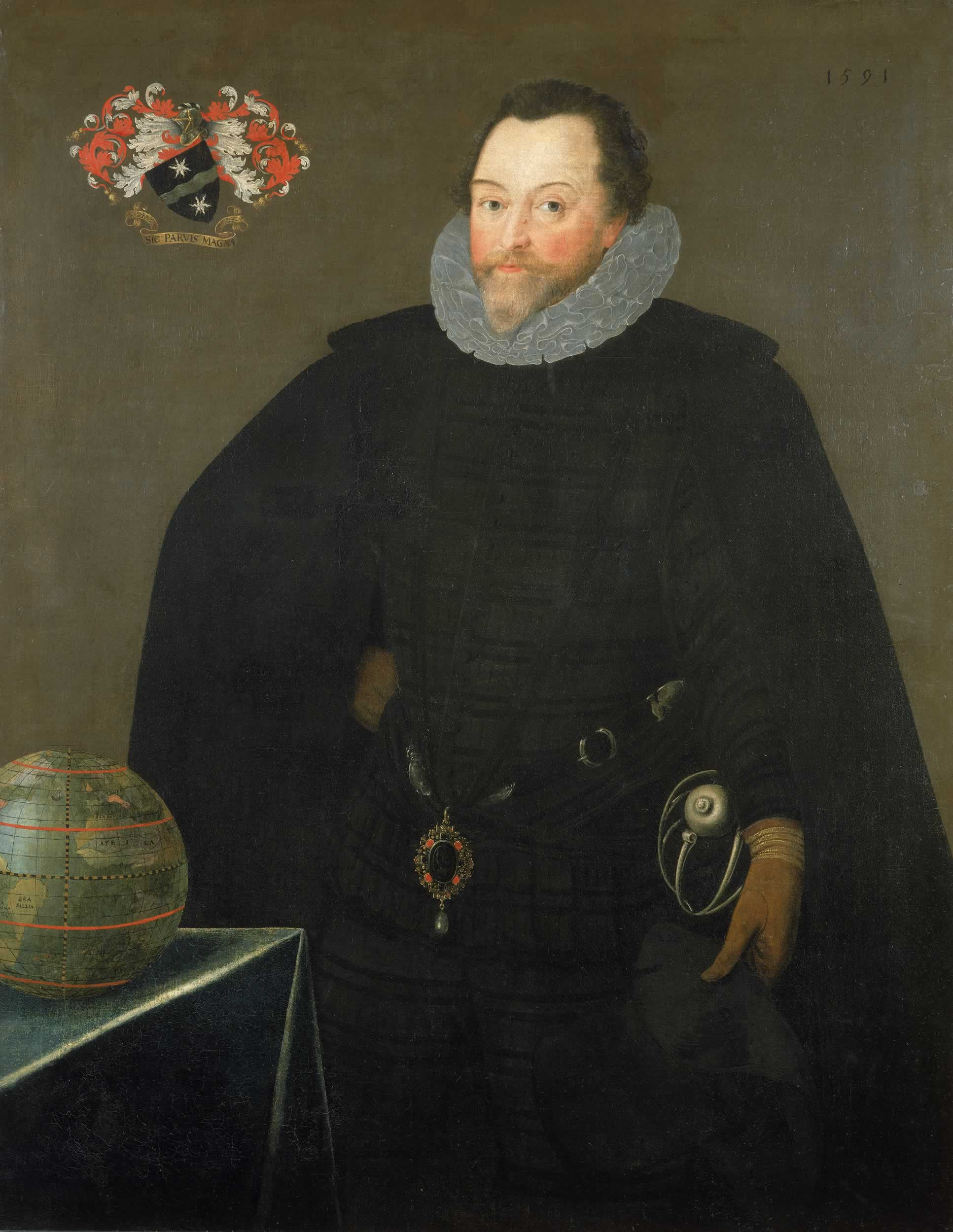
Sir Francis Drake

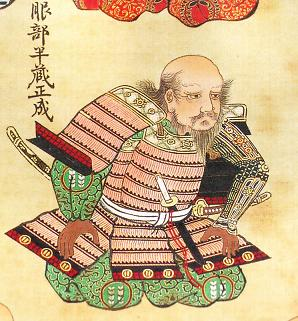
Hattori Hanzō

- January 28 – Sir Francis Drake, English explorer, sea captain, privateer, navigator, slaver, pirate and politician (b. c. 1540)
- February 7 – George I, Landgrave of Hesse-Darmstadt (b. 1547)
- February 17 – Friedrich Sylburg, German classical scholar (b. 1536)
- February 19 – Blaise de Vigenère, French cryptographer, diplomat, scientist, and author (b. 1523)
- March 23 – Henry Unton, English diplomat (b. 1557)
- March 27 – Frederick IV of Liegnitz, German noble (b. 1552)
- April 4 – Philip II, Duke of Brunswick-Grubenhagen (b. 1533)
- May – Janet Fockart, Scottish merchant and moneylender
- May 5 – Catherine de Montpensier, politically active French duchess (b. 1552)
- May 6 – Giaches de Wert, Flemish composer (b. 1535)
- May 31 – John Lesley, Scottish bishop (b. 1527)
- June 10 – John Louis I, Count of Nassau-Wiesbaden-Idstein, Germany noble (b. 1567)
- July 10 – Alessandro Alberti, Italian painter (b. 1551)
- July 23 – Henry Carey, 1st Baron Hunsdon (b. 1526)
- August 11 – Hamnet Shakespeare, son of William Shakespeare (b. 1585)
- September 9 – Anna Jagiellon, queen of Poland (b. 1523)
- September 14 – Francisco de Toledo, Spanish Catholic cardinal (b. 1532)
- September 15 – Leonhard Rauwolf, German physician and botanist (b. 1535)
- October 3 – Florent Chrestien, French writer (b. 1541)
- October 26 – István Esterházy, Hungarian noble (b. 1572)
- November 1 – Pierre Pithou, French lawyer and scholar (b. 1539)
- November 10 – Peter Wentworth, English Puritan politician (b. 1530)
- November 29
  - William Gibson (martyr), English Catholic martyr
  - Venerable William Knight, English Catholic martyr (b. 1572)
- December 8 – Francisca Nuñez de Carabajal, Portuguese-born marrano, burned at the stake
- December 27 – Pietro Pontio, Italian music theorist and composer (b. 1532)
- date unknown
  - Jean Bodin, French jurist (born 1530)
  - Anna Wecker, German writer
  - Hattori Hanzō, Japanese ninja under Tokugawa Ieyasu (b. 1541)
- probable – Henry Willobie, English poet (b. 1575)

1597

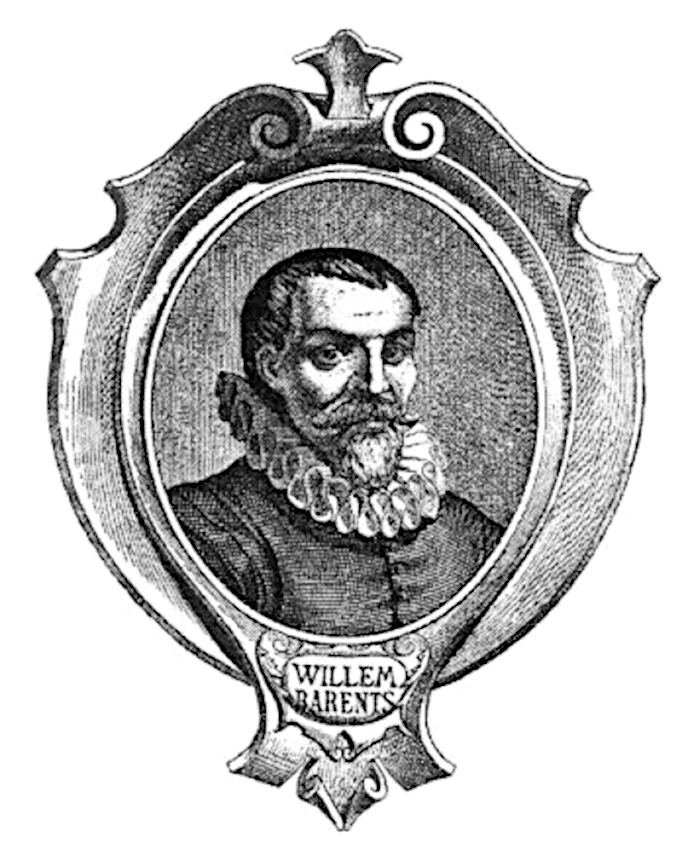
Willem Barentsz

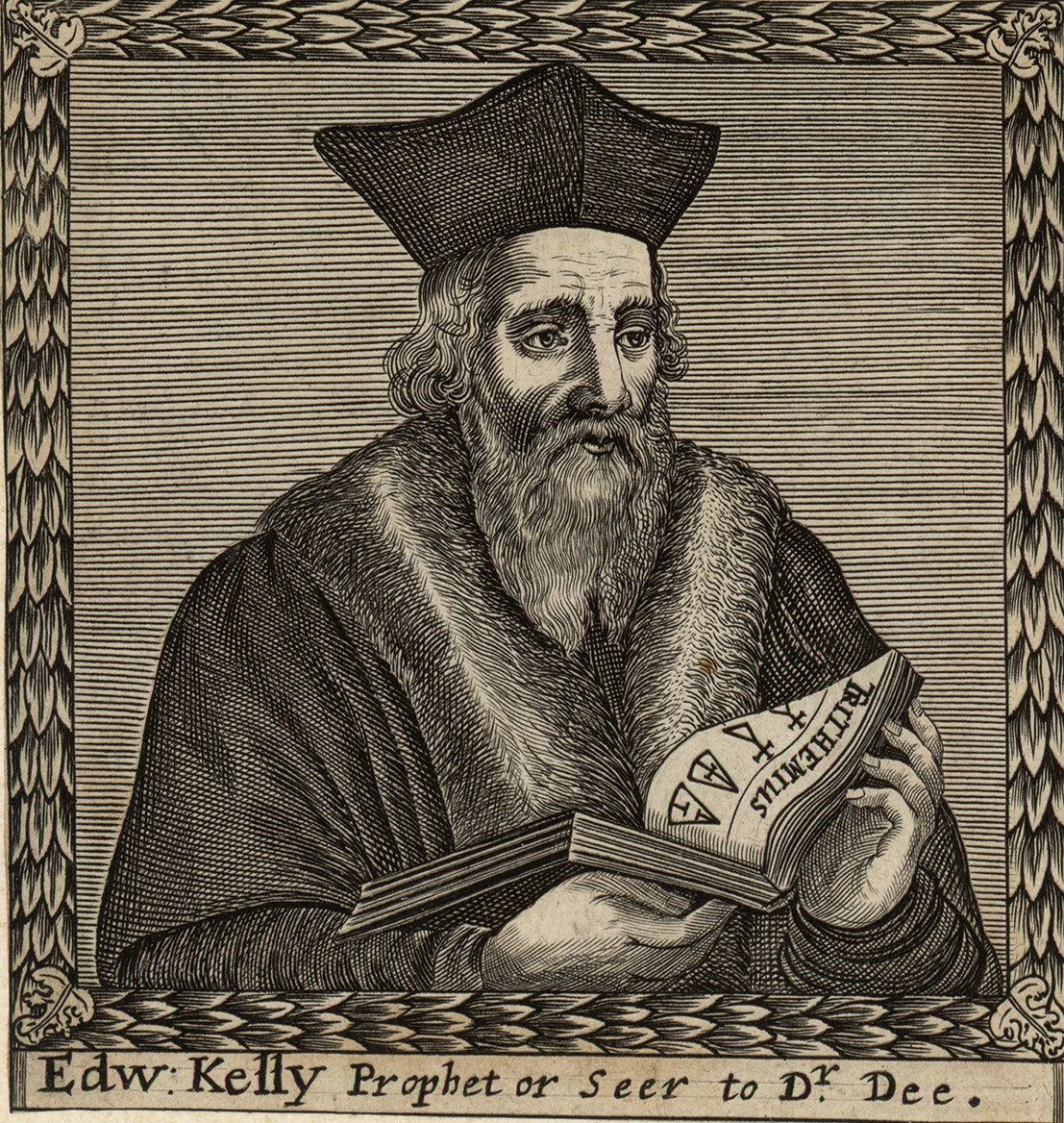
Edward Kelley

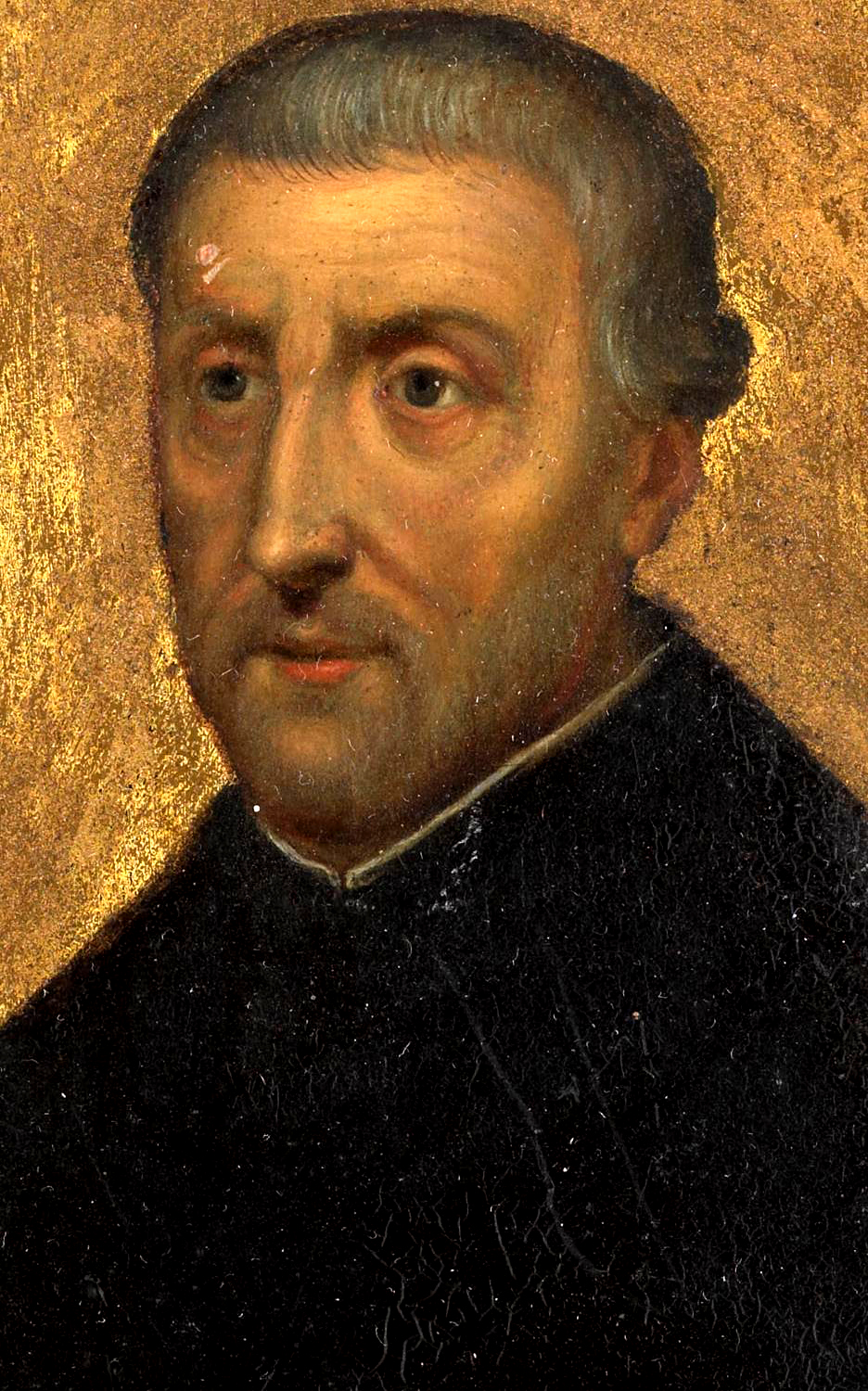
Saint Peter Canisius

- January 29
  - Maharana Pratap, Indian statesman (b. 1540)
  - Elias Ammerbach, German organist (b. 1530)
- February 2 – James Burbage, English actor
- February 5
  - Francisco Blanco, Spanish Franciscan and Roman Catholic priest, missionary, martyr and saint (b. 1570)
  - Gonsalo Garcia, Portuguese Franciscan and Roman Catholic priest, missionary, martyr and saint (b. 1557)
  - Paulo Miki, Japanese Roman Catholic priest, martyr and saint (b. c. 1562)
  - Philip of Jesus, Mexican Roman Catholic priest, missionary, martyr and saint (b. 1572)
  - 26 Martyrs of Japan
- February 6 – Franciscus Patricius, Italian philosopher and scientist (b. 1529)
- February 16 – Gilbert Génébrard, French Roman Catholic archbishop (b. 1535)
- March 6 – William Brooke, 10th Baron Cobham, English noble and politician (b. 1527)
- April 2 – Blas Valera, Peruvian historian (b. 1545)
- April 16 – Caspar Cruciger the Younger, German theologian (b. 1525)
- June 6 – William Hunnis, English poet
- June 8 – Barbara of Hesse (b. 1536)
- June 9 – José de Anchieta, Spanish Jesuit missionary (b. 1534)
- June 18 – Markus Fugger, German businessman (b. 1529)
- June 20 – Willem Barents, Dutch navigator and explorer (b. c. 1550)
- July 8 – Luís Fróis, Portuguese Jesuit missionary (b. 1532)
- July 19 – Gunilla Bielke, Queen of Sweden (b. 1568)
- July 20 – Franciscus Raphelengius, Dutch printer (b. 1539)
- July 22 – Gabriele Paleotti, Italian Roman Catholic cardinal (b. 1522)
- August 27
  - Won Gyun, Korean general and admiral during the Joseon Dynasty (b. 1540)
  - Yi Eokgi, Korean admiral during the Joseon Dynasty (b. 1561)
- September 3 – Jakobea of Baden, Margravine of Baden by birth, Duchess of Jülich-Cleves-Berg (b. 1558)
- September 9 – Helena Magenbuch, German pharmacist (b. 1523)
- September 20 – Archduchess Gregoria Maximiliana of Austria, Austrian archduchess (b. 1581)
- September 30 – William I, Count of Schwarzburg-Frankenhausen (b. 1534)
- October 4 – Sarsa Dengel, Emperor of Ethiopia (b. 1550)
- October 19 – Ashikaga Yoshiaki, Japanese shōgun (b. 1537)
- October 23 – Cyriakus Schneegass, German hymnwriter (b. 1546)
- October 27 – Alfonso II d'Este, Duke of Ferrara, Italian noble (b. 1533)
- November 1 – Edward Kelley, English spirit medium (b. 1555)
- November 11 – Gustav of Saxe-Lauenburg, German noble (b. 1570)
- November 6 – Infanta Catherine Michelle of Spain (b. 1567)
- December 17 – Frederick, Count Palatine of Zweibrücken-Vohenstrauss-Parkstein (b. 1557)
- December 21 – Petrus Canisius, Dutch Jesuit priest and saint (b. 1521)
- date unknown – Margaretha Coppier, Dutch heroine (b. 1516)

1598

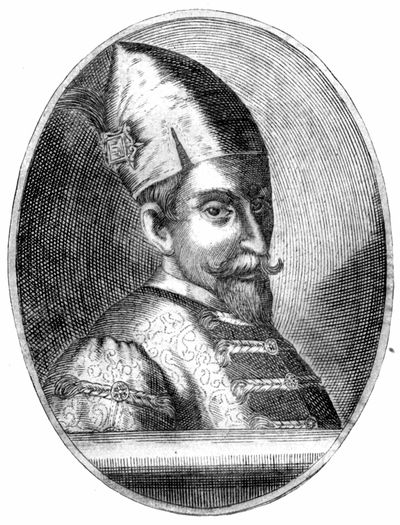
Tsar Feodor I of Russia

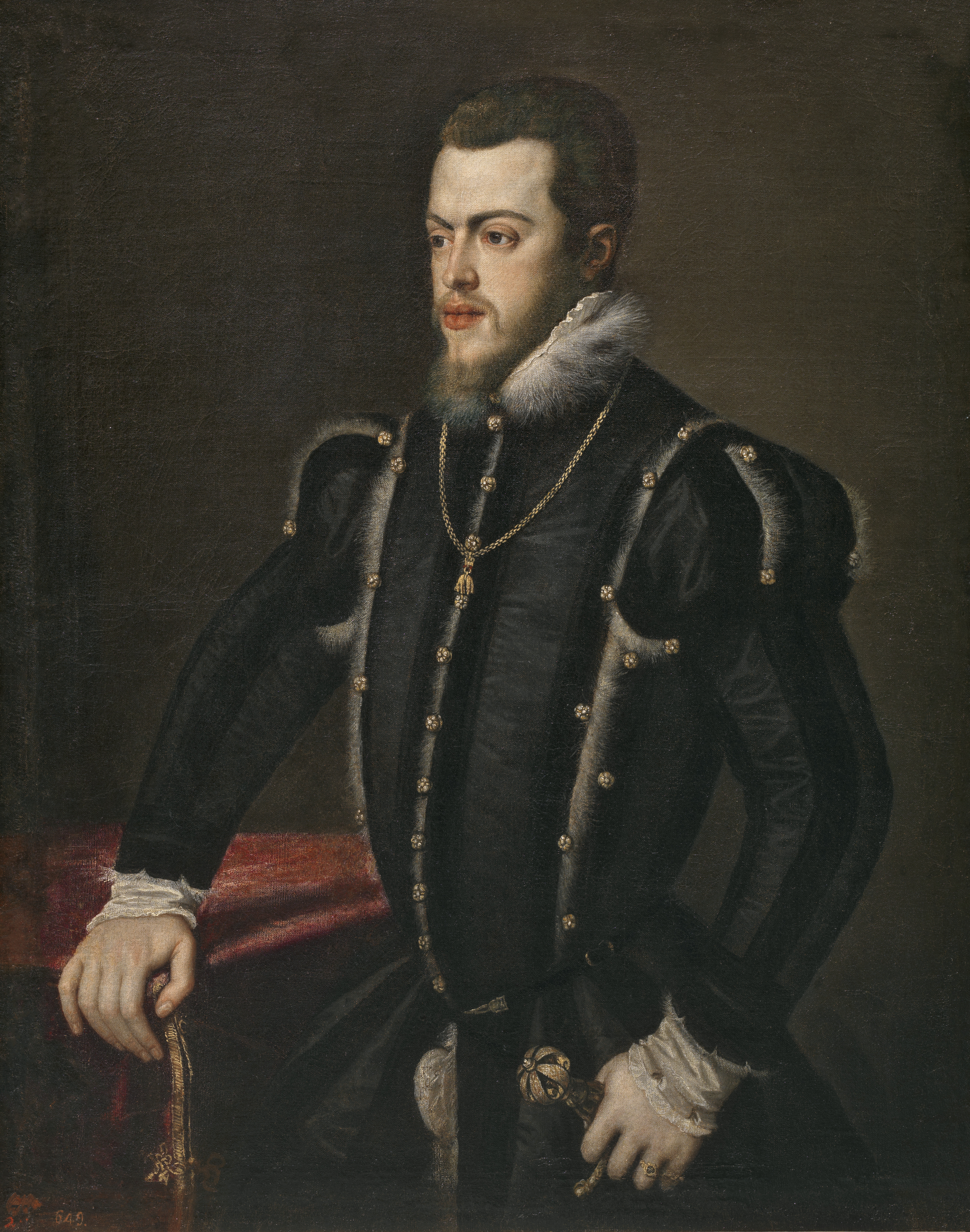
King Philip II of Spain

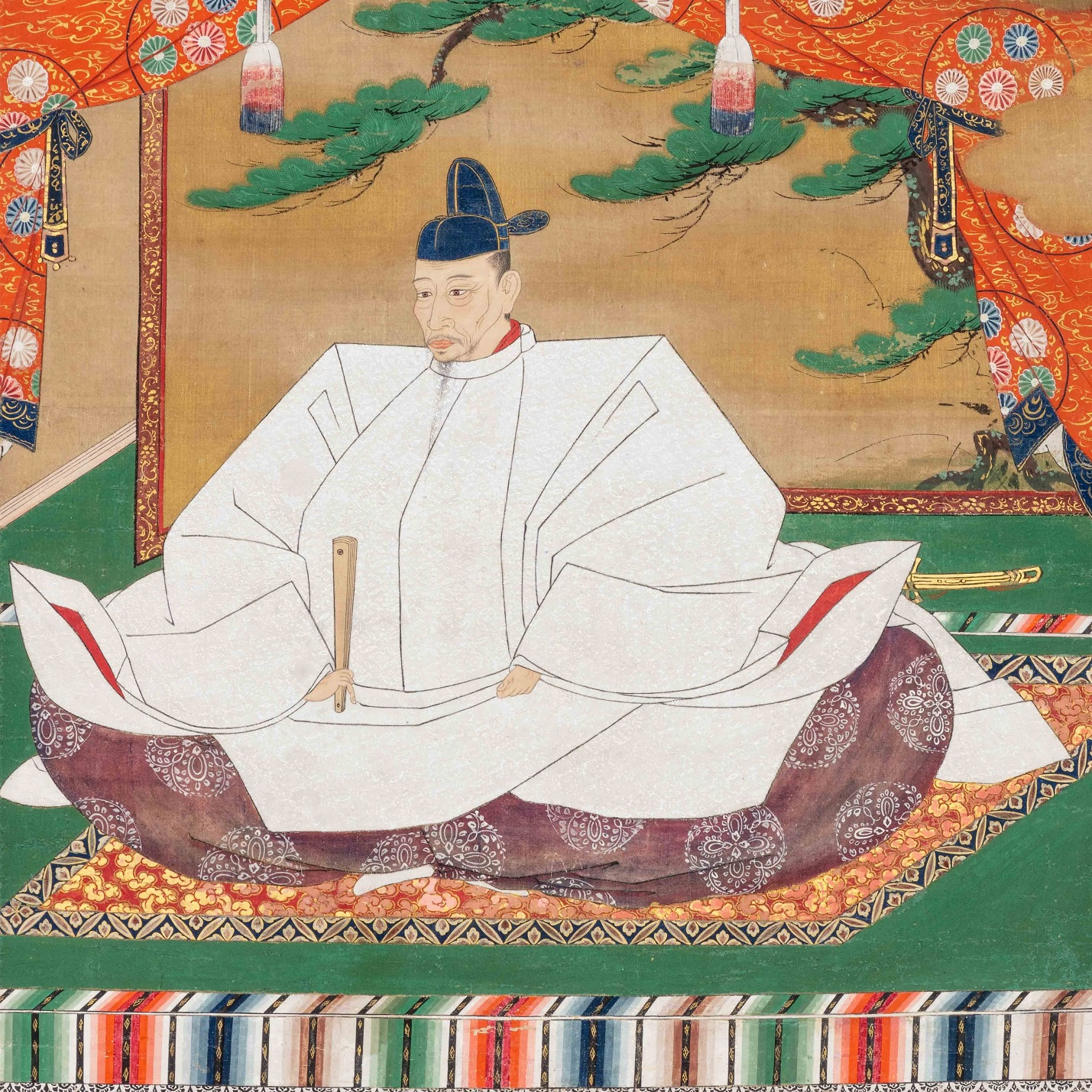
Toyotomi Hideyoshi

Yi Sun-sin

- January 8 – John George, Elector of Brandenburg, Margrave and Elector of Brandenburg and Duke of Prussia (b. 1525)
- January 9 – Jasper Heywood, English Jesuit classicist and translator (b. 1553)
- January 16 – Tsar Feodor I of Russia (b. 1557)
- February 10 – Anne of Austria, Queen of Poland (b. 1573)
- March 4 or March 5 – Lucas Maius, Lutheran Reformation pastor, theologian and playwright (b. 1522)
- March 28 – Michele Bonelli, Italian Catholic cardinal (b. 1541)
- April 8 – Ludwig Helmbold, German classical singer (b. 1532)
- April 10 – Jacopo Mazzoni, Italian philosopher (b. 1548)
- April 19
  - Hans Fugger, German businessman (b. 1531)
  - Rokkaku Yoshikata, Japanese daimyō (b. 1521)
- May 3 – Anna Guarini, Italian singer (b. 1563)
- May 18 – Philipp of Bavaria, German Catholic cardinal (b. 1576)
- June – Emery Molyneux, English maker of globes and instruments (date of birth unknown)
- June 28 – Abraham Ortelius, Flemish cartographer and geographer (b. 1527)
- June 25 – Giacomo Gaggini, Italian artist (b. 1517)
- August 4 – William Cecil, 1st Baron Burghley, English statesman (b. 1520)
- August 9 – Andreas Angelus, German pastor, teacher, chronicler of the Mark of Brandenburg (b. 1561)
- September 13 – Philip II of Spain (b. 1527)
- September 18 – Toyotomi Hideyoshi, Japanese warlord (b. 1537)
- October 11 – Joachim Camerarius the Younger, German scientist (b. 1534)
- November 12 – Johannes Schenck von Grafenberg, German physician (b. 1530)
- December 6 – Paolo Paruta, Italian historian (b. 1540)
- December 15 – Philips of Marnix, Lord of Saint-Aldegonde, Dutch writer and statesman (b. 1538)
- December 16 – Yi Sun-sin, Korean naval leader (b. 1545)
- December 31 – Heinrich Rantzau, German humanist writer, astrologer, and astrological writer (b. 1526)
- date unknown
  - Abdulla Khan, Uzbek/Turkoman ruler
  - Teodora Ginés, Dominican musician and composer (b. c. 1530)
  - Nicolas Pithou, French lawyer and author (b. 1524)

1599

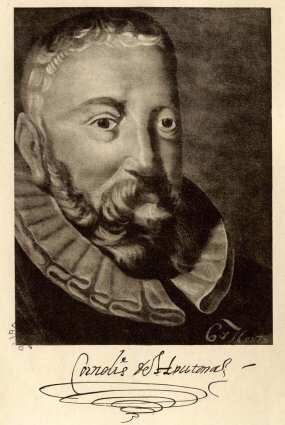
Cornelis de Houtman

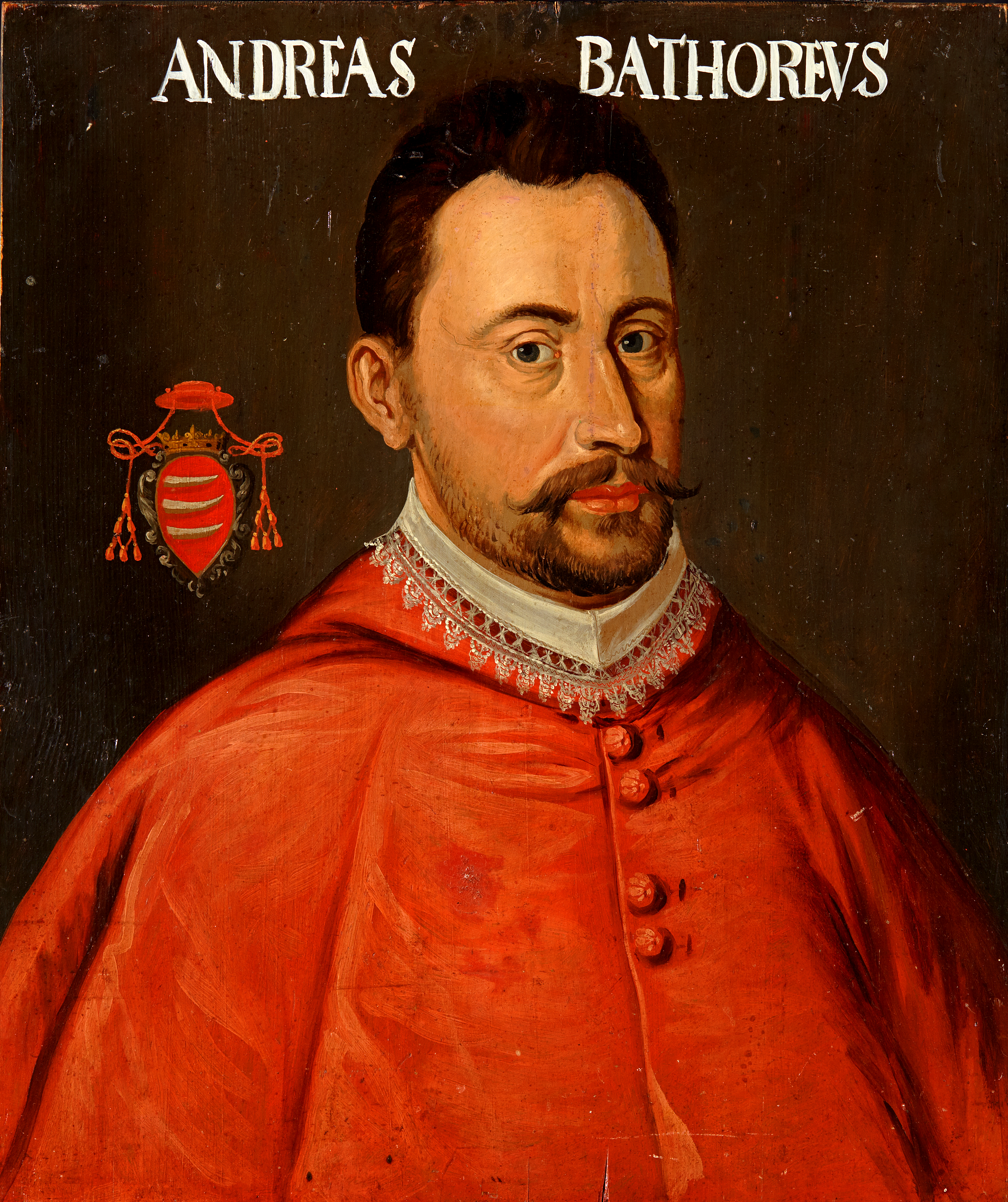
Andrew Báthory

- January 13 – Edmund Spenser, English poet (b. 1552)
- January 22 – Cristofano Malvezzi, Italian composer (b. 1547)
- February 8 – Robert Rollock, Scottish Presbyterian, first principal of the university of Edinburgh (b. 1555)
- March 19 – Stanisław Radziwiłł, Grand Marshal of Lithuania (b. 1559)
- April 1 – Matsura Takanobu, Japanese samurai (b, 1529)
- April 10 – Gabrielle d'Estrées, mistress of King Henry IV of France (b. 1573)
- April 14 – Henry Wallop, English statesman (b. c. 1540)
- April 22 – Lorenz Scholz von Rosenau, German botanist (b. 1552)
- April 27 – Maeda Toshiie, Japanese samurai and warlord (b. 1538)
- May 12 – Sultan Murad Mirza, Mughal prince (b. 1570)
- May 28 – Maria of Nassau, Dutch Countess (b. 1539)
- June 2 – Philipp V, Count of Hanau-Lichtenberg (b. 1541)
- June 14 – Kōriki Masanaga, Japanese military commander (b. 1558)
- June 29 – Archduchess Catherine Renata of Austria, Austrian archduchess (b. 1576)
- July – Kwon Yul, Korean military commander (b. 1537)
- July 11 – Chōsokabe Motochika, Japanese Sengoku Period daimyō
- August 22 – Luca Marenzio, Italian composer (b. 1553)
- September 1 – Cornelis de Houtman, Dutch explorer (b.1565)
- September 11 – Beatrice Cenci, Italian noblewoman (executed for patricide) (b. 1577)
- August 8 – Song Ik-pil, Korean scholar (b. 1534)
- October 18 – Daniel Adam z Veleslavína, Czech lexicographer (b. 1546)
- November 3 – Andrew Báthory, deposed Prince of Transylvania (decapitated) (b. c. 1563)
- November 7 – Gasparo Tagliacozzi, Italian surgeon (b. 1545)
- November 8 – Francisco Guerrero, Spanish composer (b. 1528)
- November 22 – Nanbu Nobunao, Japanese daimyō (b. 1546)
- December 13 – Enrico Caetani, Italian Catholic cardinal (b. 1550)
- December 14 – Joan Boyle, English noble, first spouse of Richard Boyle, 1st Earl of Cork (b. 1578)
- December 27 – Francisco Pérez de Valenzuela, Spanish noble (b. 1528)
- After December 18 – Minye Kyawswa II of Ava, Burmese defecting crown prince of the Toungoo Empire (killed by invading forces) (b. 1567)
- date unknown – Chand Bibi, Indian regent and warrior (b. 1550)
