= 1597 =

1597 in various calendars
- Gregorian calendar: 1597; MDXCVII
- Ab urbe condita: 2350
- Armenian calendar: 1046; ԹՎ ՌԽԶ
- Assyrian calendar: 6347
- Balinese saka calendar: 1518–1519
- Bengali calendar: 1003–1004
- Berber calendar: 2547
- English Regnal year: 39 Eliz. 1 – 40 Eliz. 1
- Buddhist calendar: 2141
- Burmese calendar: 959
- Byzantine calendar: 7105–7106
- Chinese calendar: 丙申年 (Fire Monkey); 4294 or 4087 — to — 丁酉年 (Fire Rooster); 4295 or 4088
- Coptic calendar: 1313–1314
- Discordian calendar: 2763
- Ethiopian calendar: 1589–1590
- Hebrew calendar: 5357–5358
- Hindu calendars
- Vikram Samvat: 1653–1654
- Shaka Samvat: 1518–1519
- Kali Yuga: 4697–4698
- Holocene calendar: 11597
- Igbo calendar: 597–598
- Iranian calendar: 975–976
- Islamic calendar: 1005–1006
- Japanese calendar: Keichō 2 (慶長２年)
- Javanese calendar: 1517–1518
- Julian calendar: Gregorian minus 10 days
- Korean calendar: 3930
- Minguo calendar: 315 before ROC 民前315年
- Nanakshahi calendar: 129
- Thai solar calendar: 2139–2140
- Tibetan calendar: མེ་ཕོ་སྤྲེ་ལོ་ (male Fire-Monkey); 1723 or 1342 or 570 — to — མེ་མོ་བྱ་ལོ་ (female Fire-Bird); 1724 or 1343 or 571

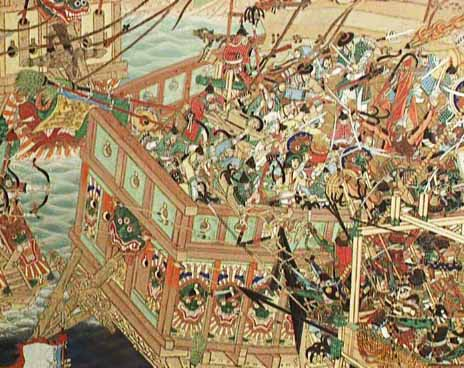
October 26: Battle of Myeongnyang

1597 (MDXCVII) was a common year starting on Wednesday of the Gregorian calendar and a common year starting on Saturday of the Julian calendar, the 1597th year of the Common Era (CE) and Anno Domini (AD) designations, the 597th year of the 2nd millennium, the 97th year of the 16th century, and the 8th year of the 1590s decade. As of the start of 1597, the Gregorian calendar was 10 days ahead of the Julian calendar, which remained in localized use until 1923.

== Events ==
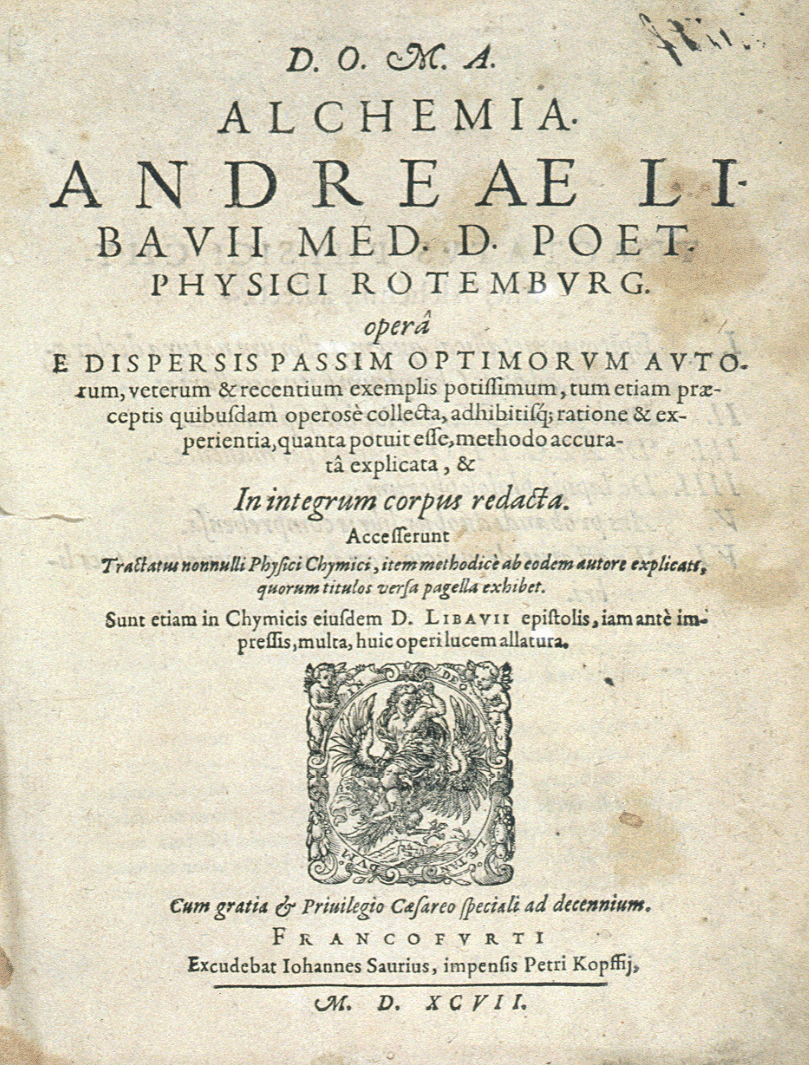
Andreas Libavius's Alchemia, an early chemistry text, is published.

=== January–March ===
- January 4 – Japan's Chancellor of the Realm, Toyotomi Hideyoshi, sends 26 European Christians, arrested on December 8, 1596, on a forced march from Kyoto to Nagasaki.
- January 24 – Battle of Turnhout: Maurice of Nassau defeats a Spanish force under Jean de Rie of Varas, in the Netherlands.
- February 5 – In Japan, 26 European Catholic Christians are executed in Nagasaki by crucifixion. They had the misfortune of being shipwrecked on the Japanese coast on October 19, 1596.
- February 8 – Sir Anthony Shirley, England's "best-educated pirate", raids Jamaica.
- February 24 – The last battle of the Cudgel War is fought on the Santavuori Hill in Ilmajoki, Ostrobothnia.
- March 11 – Amiens is taken by Spanish forces.

=== April–June ===
- April 10 – The Serb uprising of 1596–97 ends in defeat for the rebels, at the field of Gacko (Gatačko Polje).
- April 19 – Prince Nyaungyan Min ignores the orders of King Nanda Bayin of Burma and seizes control of the Kingdom of Ava (now in Upper Myanmar)
- April 23 – Probable first performance of William Shakespeare's The Merry Wives of Windsor.
- April 27 – Johannes Kepler marries Barbara Muhleck.
- May 13 – King Henry IV of France and England's General Thomas Baskerville begin the siege of the city of Amiens in France, which had been captured on March 11 by the Spanish Army. The city is recaptured by September 25.
- May 27 – The Kingdom of Kotte, on most of the western side of the island of Sri Lanka, upon the death of King Dharmapala. With no heirs, Dharmapala had made a will bequeathing the entire kingdom to the European nation of Portugal, creating the territory of Portuguese Ceylon (Puruthugisi Lankawa or Porthueka Ilankai).
- June 13 – The Staten-Generaal of the Dutch Republic approves a proposal for the Generaliteitscollege, a common board for the Republic's five separate navies, the Admiralty of Amsterdam, the Admiralty of Rotterdam, the Admiralty of Zeeland, the Admiralty of the Noorderkwartier and the Admiralty of Friesland.

=== July–September ===
- July 14 – Scottish poet Alexander Montgomerie is declared an outlaw, after the collapse of a Catholic plot.
- July 28 – After the performance of the satirical play The Isle of Dogs, written by Thomas Nashe and Ben Jonson, at the Swan Theatre, the Privy Council of England concludes that the "lewd play" is full of seditious and slanderous matter. Jonson is arrested, along with two actors, Gabriel Spenser and Robert Shaa, and the three are sent to Marshalsea Prison. A raid on the home of Thomas Nashe seizes his papers, but Nashe is not found. The three prisoners are released later in the year and return to the stage. All copies of The Isle of Dogs script are destroyed.
- August 13 – The Siege of Namwon begins in Korea.
- August 14 – First Dutch Expedition to Indonesia: A Dutch expedition commanded by Cornelis de Houtman returns to Amsterdam, after having successfully reached Java. This achievement opens the Spice trade, which had until then been monopolised by the Portuguese, to the Dutch, who in the next years launch several more expeditions to the Indies.
- August 17 – Islands Voyage: Robert Devereux, 2nd Earl of Essex, and Sir Walter Raleigh set sail on an expedition to the Azores.
- August 19 – Rheinberg capitulates to forces led by Maurice of Naussau.
- August 24 – Christian IV of Denmark-Norway refuses to let Tycho Brahe return to Denmark.
- August 28 – Imjin War: Battle of Chilcheollyang – The Japanese fleet defeats the Koreans, in their only naval victory of the war.
- September 25 – Amiens is retaken from the Spanish by Anglo-French forces, led by Henry IV of France, after a four-month siege.

=== October–December ===
- October 18 – The 3rd Spanish Armada, a fleet of 140 ships, departs from the port of La Coruña with 12,634 soldiers and sailors and a plan to invade the British Isles with a landing at Falmouth in Cornwall.
- October 21 – The Spanish Armada reaches the English Channel without opposition. An English ship sees the invading force's approach, but is intercepted and sunk, with the survivors being taken prisoner. The Armada encounters a storm the next day.
- October 25 – Following the loss of an artillery ship and the galleon San Bartolome, Spanish Admiral Diego Brochero orders the remaining ships in the attacking Armada to disperse until the weather improves.
- October 26 – Battle of Myeongnyang: The Koreans, commanded by Yi Sunsin, are victorious over a Japanese invasion fleet.
- November 10 – In the last major action during the war of the 3rd Spanish Armada, the galleon Bear of Amsterdam is captured as it approaches Falmouth, where an English squadron intercepts it and leads it into Dartmouth.
- November 12 – Lingen capitulates to forces led by Maurice of Nassau.
- November 21 – The remainder of the 3rd Spanish Armada is assembled at La Coruña. Only 108 of the original fleet of 140 ships is left, and many of the vessels require food and supplies. King Philip elects not to attempt another invasion of the British Isles.
- December 6 – Queen Elizabeth of England appoints George Nicholson as the English Resident in Scotland, the London's chief diplomatic official to Edinburgh, with a letter of accreditation for Nicholson to present to King James VI of Scotland.
- December 7 – Lazzaro Grimaldi Cebà is elected as the new Doge of the Republic of Genoa, as the previous chief executive, Matteo Senarega completes his two-year term. Senarega is given the post of procuratore perpetuo.
- December 23
  - The Roman Catholic order of the Congregatio Patrum Doctrinae Christianae, which will later be more commonly known as the Christian Doctrine Fathers, is approved by Pope Clement VIII. Founded on September 29, 1592, the order continues to operate more than four centuries later and is headquartered in Rome.
  - Prince Sigismund Báthory signs an agreement with Rudolf II, Holy Roman Emperor to abdicate the throne of Transylvania in return for the Silesian duchies of Racibórz and Opole and an annual subsidy of 50,000 thalers.

=== Date unknown ===
- Abbas I ends the Uzbek raids on his lands.
- Yaqob succeeds his father Sarsa Dengel, as Emperor of Ethiopia at the age of 7.
- Jacopo Peri writes Dafne, now recognised as the first opera.
- The first edition of Francis Bacon's Essays is published.
- Andreas Libavius publishes Alchemia, a pioneering chemistry textbook.
- 12 million pesos of silver cross the Pacific. Although it is unknown just how much silver flowed from the Spanish base of Manila in the Philippines to the Ming Dynasty of China, it is known that the main port for the Mexican silver trade—Acapulco—shipped out 150,000 to 345,000 kg (4 to 9 million taels) of silver annually from this year to 1602.
- Tobias Hess corresponds with Simon Studion and agrees with him that the Papacy must fall in 1604.

== Births ==
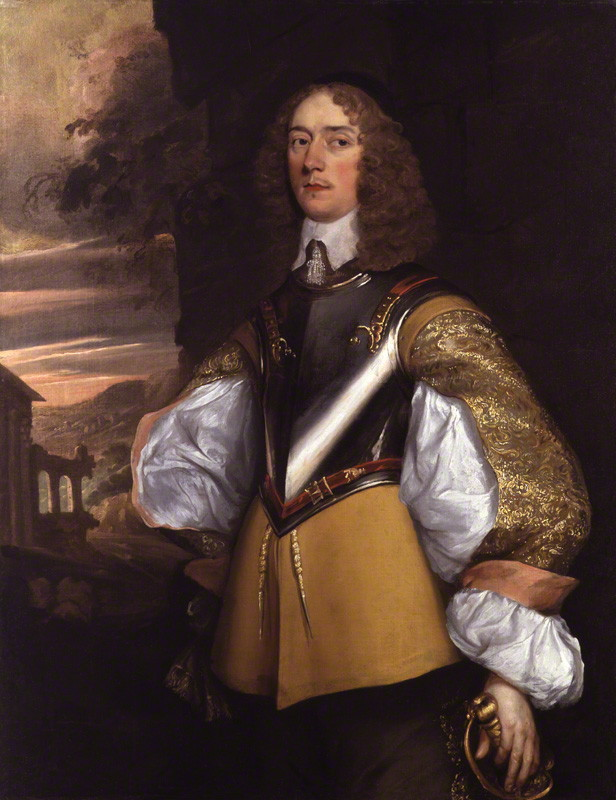
Henry Gage

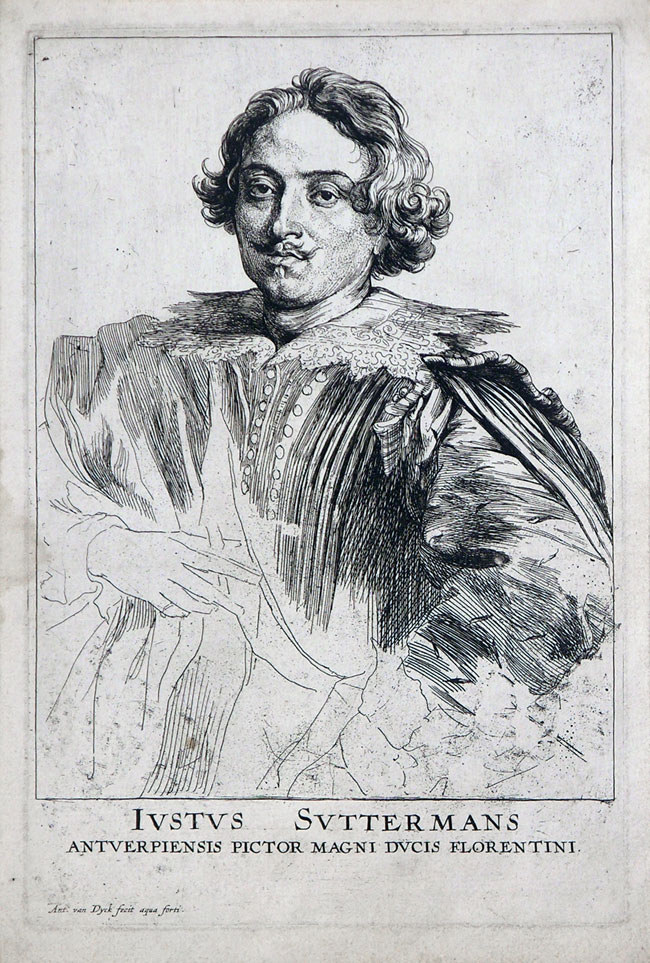
Justus Sustermans

=== January–March ===
- January 12 – François Duquesnoy, Flemish Baroque sculptor in Rome (d. 1643)
- January 25 – Johann Philipp, Duke of Saxe-Altenburg, German Duke (d. 1639)
- January 31 – John Francis Regis, French Jesuit priest (d. 1640)
- February 24 – Vincent Voiture, French poet (d. 1648)
- March 1 – Jean-Charles de la Faille, Belgian mathematician (d. 1652)
- March 10 – Ercole Gennari, Italian drawer and painter (d. 1658)
- March 18 – Jérôme le Royer de la Dauversière, French nobleman, founder of Montreal and an order of nursing Sisters (d. 1659)
- March 21 – Juan Alonso y Ocón, Spanish Catholic prelate, Archbishop of La Plata o Charcas (d. 1656)
- March 27 – William Hyde, President of English College, Douai (d. 1651)

=== April–June ===
- April 9 – John Davenport, English Puritan clergyman, co-founder of the American colony of New Haven (d. 1670)
- April 13 – Giovanni Battista Hodierna, Italian astronomer (d. 1660)
- April 23 – Alvise Contarini, Italian diplomat, nobleman (d. 1651)
- May 13 – Cornelis Schut, Flemish painter, draughtsman and engraver (d. 1655)
- May 15 – Squire Bence, English politician (d. 1648)
- May 25 – Veit Erbermann, German theologian (d. 1675)
- May 31 – Jean-Louis Guez de Balzac, French author (d. 1654)
- June 9 – Pieter Jansz. Saenredam, Dutch painter (d. 1665)

=== July–September ===
- July 2 – Theodoor Rombouts, Flemish painter (d. 1637)
- July 13 – Sebastian Stoskopff, French painter (d. 1657)
- July 22 – Virgilio Mazzocchi, Italian Baroque composer (d. 1646)
- July 29 – Abdias Treu, German mathematician and academic (d. 1669)
- August 20
  - Girolamo Grimaldi-Cavalleroni, Italian Catholic cardinal (d. 1685)
  - Józef Bartłomiej Zimorowic, Polish poet (d. 1677)
- August 21 – Roger Twysden, English antiquarian and royalist (d. 1672)
- August 29 – Henry Gage, Royalist officer in the English Civil War (d. 1645)
- September 23 – Francesco Barberini, Italian Catholic cardinal (d. 1679)
- September 28 – Justus Sustermans, Flemish painter (d. 1681)

=== October–December ===
- October 7 – Captain John Underhill, English settler and soldier (d. 1672)
- October 13 – Otto Louis of Salm-Kyrburg-Mörchingen, Swedish general in the Thirty Years' War (d. 1634)
- October 20 – Matthew Hutton, English politician (d. 1666)
- November 15 – Juan Tellez-Girón y Enriquez de Ribera, 4th Duke of Osuna (d. 1656)
- November 19 – Elizabeth Charlotte of the Palatinate, wife of George William, Elector of Brandenburg (d. 1660)
- December 16
  - George Albert I, Count of Erbach-Schönberg (d. 1647)
  - Pieter de Neyn, Dutch painter (d. 1639)
- December 22 – Frederick III, Duke of Holstein-Gottorp (d. 1659)
- December 23
  - Martin Opitz, German poet (d. 1639)
- December 24 – Honoré II, Prince of Monaco (d. 1662)

=== Date unknown ===
- Cristóbal Diatristán de Acuña, Spanish missionary and explorer (d. 1676)
- Johan van Heemskerk, Dutch poet (d. 1656)
- Cornelis Jol, Dutch naval commander and privateer (d. 1641)
- Wang Wei, Chinese poet (d. 1647)

== Deaths ==
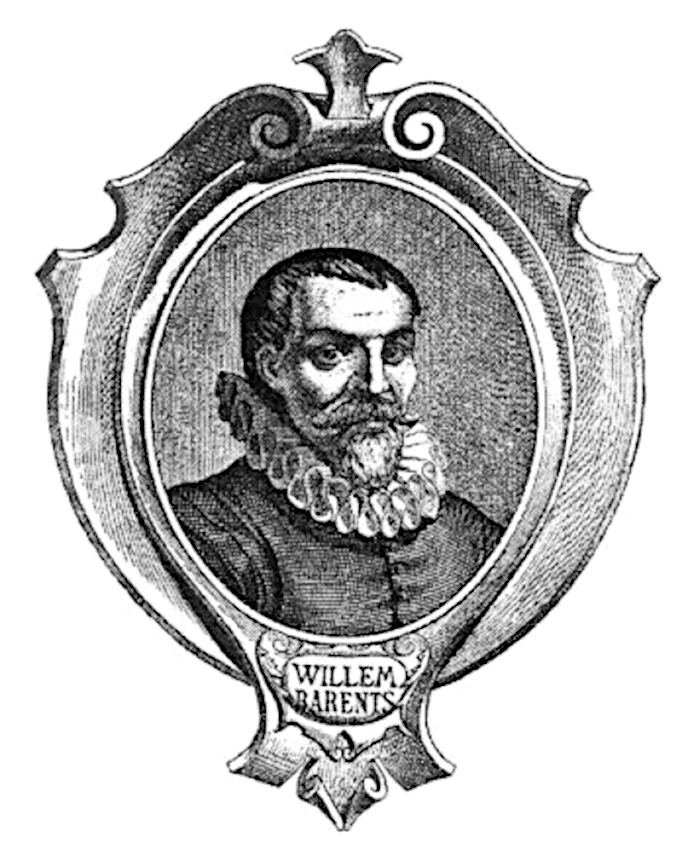
Willem Barentsz

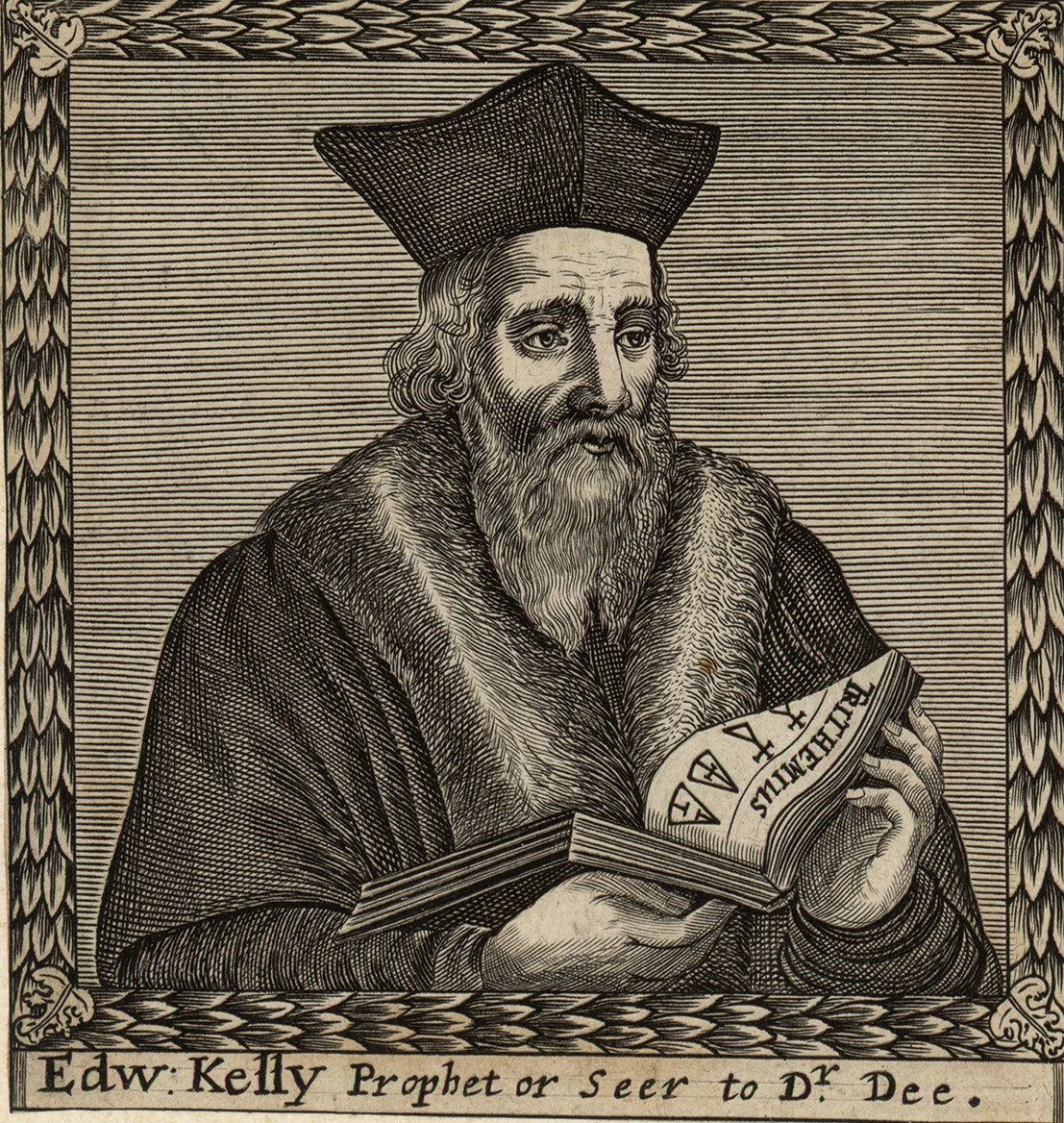
Edward Kelley

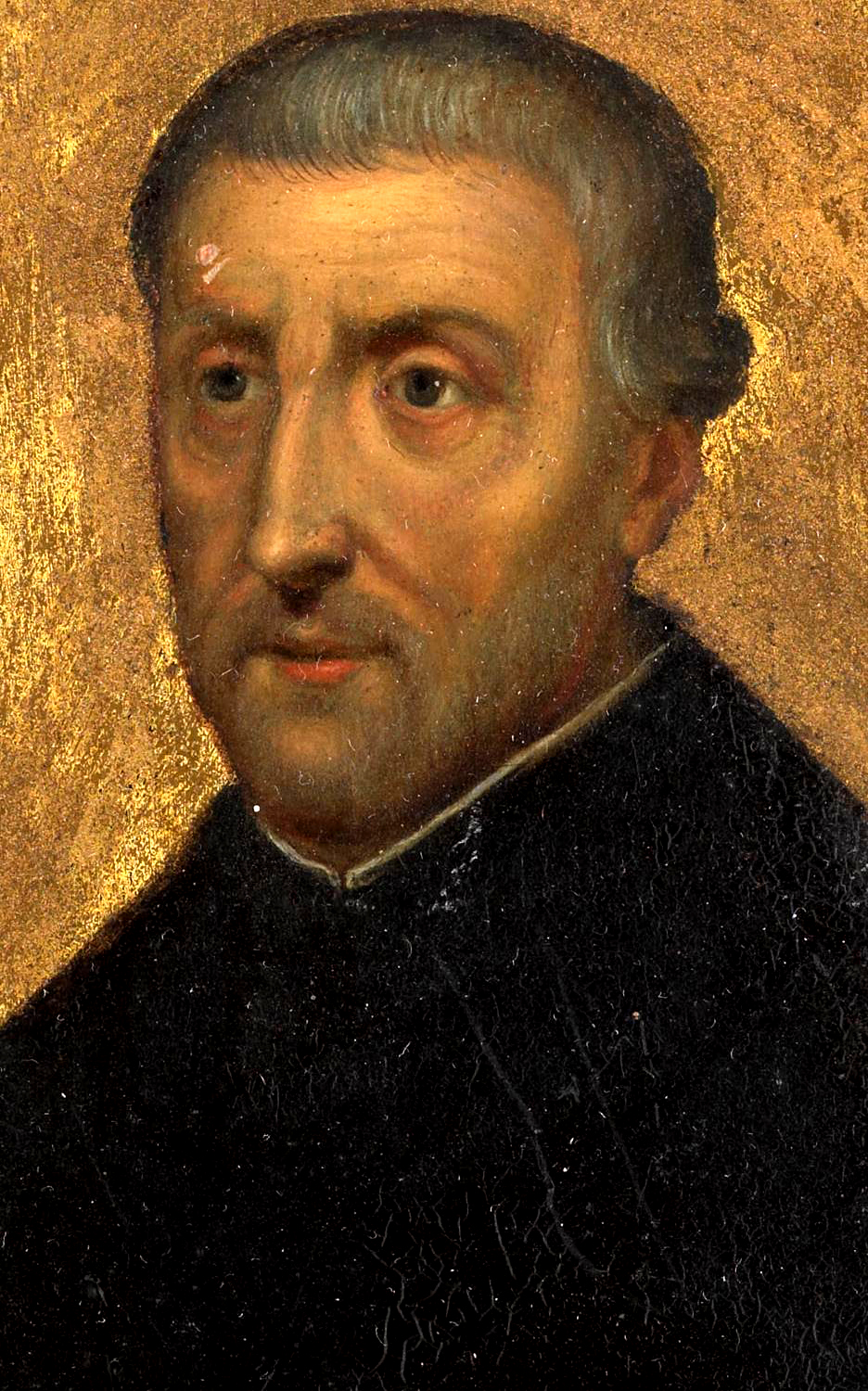
Saint Peter Canisius

- January 29
  - Maharana Pratap, Indian statesman (b. 1540)
  - Elias Ammerbach, German organist (b. 1530)
- February 2 – James Burbage, English actor
- February 5
  - Francisco Blanco, Spanish Franciscan and Roman Catholic priest, missionary, martyr and saint (b. 1570)
  - Gonsalo Garcia, Portuguese Franciscan and Roman Catholic priest, missionary, martyr and saint (b. 1557)
  - Paulo Miki, Japanese Roman Catholic priest, martyr and saint (b. c. 1562)
  - Philip of Jesus, Mexican Roman Catholic priest, missionary, martyr and saint (b. 1572)
  - 26 Martyrs of Japan
- February 6 – Franciscus Patricius, Italian philosopher and scientist (b. 1529)
- February 16 – Gilbert Génébrard, French Roman Catholic archbishop (b. 1535)
- March 6 – William Brooke, 10th Baron Cobham, English noble and politician (b. 1527)
- April 2 – Blas Valera, Peruvian historian (b. 1545)
- April 16 – Caspar Cruciger the Younger, German theologian (b. 1525)
- June 6 – William Hunnis, English poet
- June 8 – Barbara of Hesse (b. 1536)
- June 9 – José de Anchieta, Spanish Jesuit missionary (b. 1534)
- June 18 – Markus Fugger, German businessman (b. 1529)
- June 20 – Willem Barents, Dutch navigator and explorer (b. c. 1550)
- July 8 – Luís Fróis, Portuguese Jesuit missionary (b. 1532)
- July 19 – Gunilla Bielke, Queen of Sweden (b. 1568)
- July 20 – Franciscus Raphelengius, Dutch printer (b. 1539)
- July 22 – Gabriele Paleotti, Italian Roman Catholic cardinal (b. 1522)
- August 27
  - Wŏn Kyun, Korean general and admiral during the Joseon Dynasty (b. 1540)
  - Yi Ŏkki, Korean admiral during the Joseon Dynasty (b. 1561)
- September 3 – Jakobea of Baden, Margravine of Baden by birth, Duchess of Jülich-Cleves-Berg (b. 1558)
- September 9 – Helena Magenbuch, German pharmacist (b. 1523)
- September 20 – Archduchess Gregoria Maximiliana of Austria, Austrian archduchess (b. 1581)
- September 30 – William I, Count of Schwarzburg-Frankenhausen (b. 1534)
- October 4 – Sarsa Dengel, Emperor of Ethiopia (b. 1550)
- October 19 – Ashikaga Yoshiaki, Japanese shōgun (b. 1537)
- October 23 – Cyriakus Schneegass, German hymnwriter (b. 1546)
- October 27 – Alfonso II d'Este, Duke of Ferrara (b. 1533)
- November 1 – Edward Kelley, English spirit medium (b. 1555)
- November 11 – Gustav of Saxe-Lauenburg, German noble (b. 1570)
- November 6 – Infanta Catalina Micaela of Spain (b. 1567)
- December 17 – Frederick, Count Palatine of Zweibrücken-Vohenstrauss-Parkstein (b. 1557)
- December 21 – Petrus Canisius, Dutch Jesuit priest and saint (b. 1521)
- date unknown – Margaretha Coppier, Dutch heroine (b. 1516)
