= Pedro Martins =

Pedro Martins may refer to:

- Pedro Martins (racewalker) (born 1968), Portuguese race walker
- Pedro Martins (badminton) (born 1990), Portuguese badminton player
- Pedro Martins (Portuguese footballer) (born 1970), Portuguese retired footballer
- Pedro Martins (Brazilian footballer) (born 1988)
- Pedro Henrique Martins (born 1985), Brazilian footballer
- Pedro Martins, Lord of the Tower of Vasconcelos, Portuguese 12th-century noble knight
- Pedro Martins (bishop) (1542-1598), Portuguese Jesuit prelate
