= James Kisai =

One of the 26 Martyrs of Japan

Saint James Kisai SJ
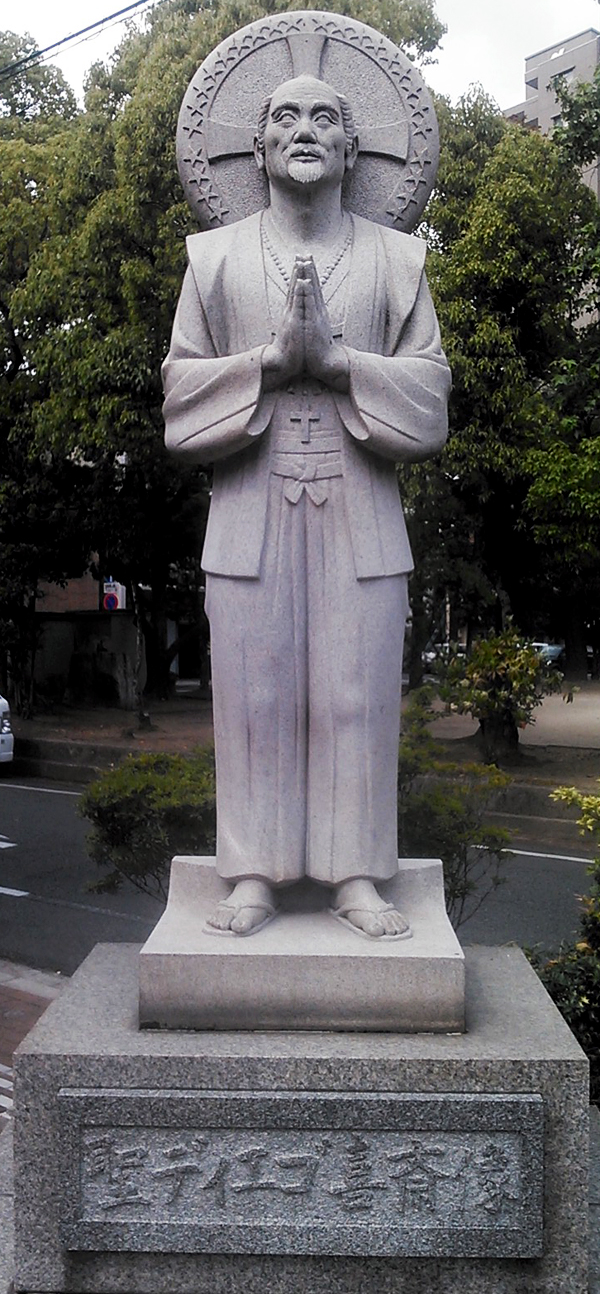
- Statue of Kisai in Okayama Catholic Church in Okayama, Japan

Jesuit and Martyr
- Born: c. 1534; Tsudaka District, Bizen Province (now within Okayama Prefecture)
- Died: 5 February 1597 (aged 62/63); Nagasaki, Japan
- Venerated in: Roman Catholic Church
- Beatified: September 14, 1627 by Pope Urban VIII
- Canonized: June 8, 1862 by Pope Pius IX
- Feast: 6 February
- Patronage: Japan

James Kisai, SJ, also known as Diego Kisai (ディエゴ喜斎) or Jacobo Kisai, was a Japanese Jesuit lay brother and saint, one of the 26 Martyrs of Japan.

Out of the 26, Kisai, Paul Miki, and John Soan de Goto were the only Jesuits to be executed in Nagasaki on February 5, 1597.

== Biography ==
James Kisai was born as Ichikawa Kisaemon (市川喜佐衛門).

As a lay catechist intending to join the Society of Jesus, he was imprisoned along with 23 other Catholics in December 1596 in the aftermath of the pivotal San Felipe incident. While he was in prison, Kisai and a fellow lay catechist John Soan de Goto gave their vows to Jesuit fathers John Rodriguez and Francis Pasia to enter the Jesuit order. Shortly after, Kisai and the other imprisoned Catholics were forced to take a land journey during the winter time from Sakai to Nagasaki. Kisai and the others would eventually reach Nishizaka Hill in Nagasaki, where they were crucified and lanced to death on February 5, 1597.
