= Twenty-Six Martyrs Museum and Monument =

Memorial in Nagasaki, Japan

Coordinates: 32°45′17″N 129°52′18″E

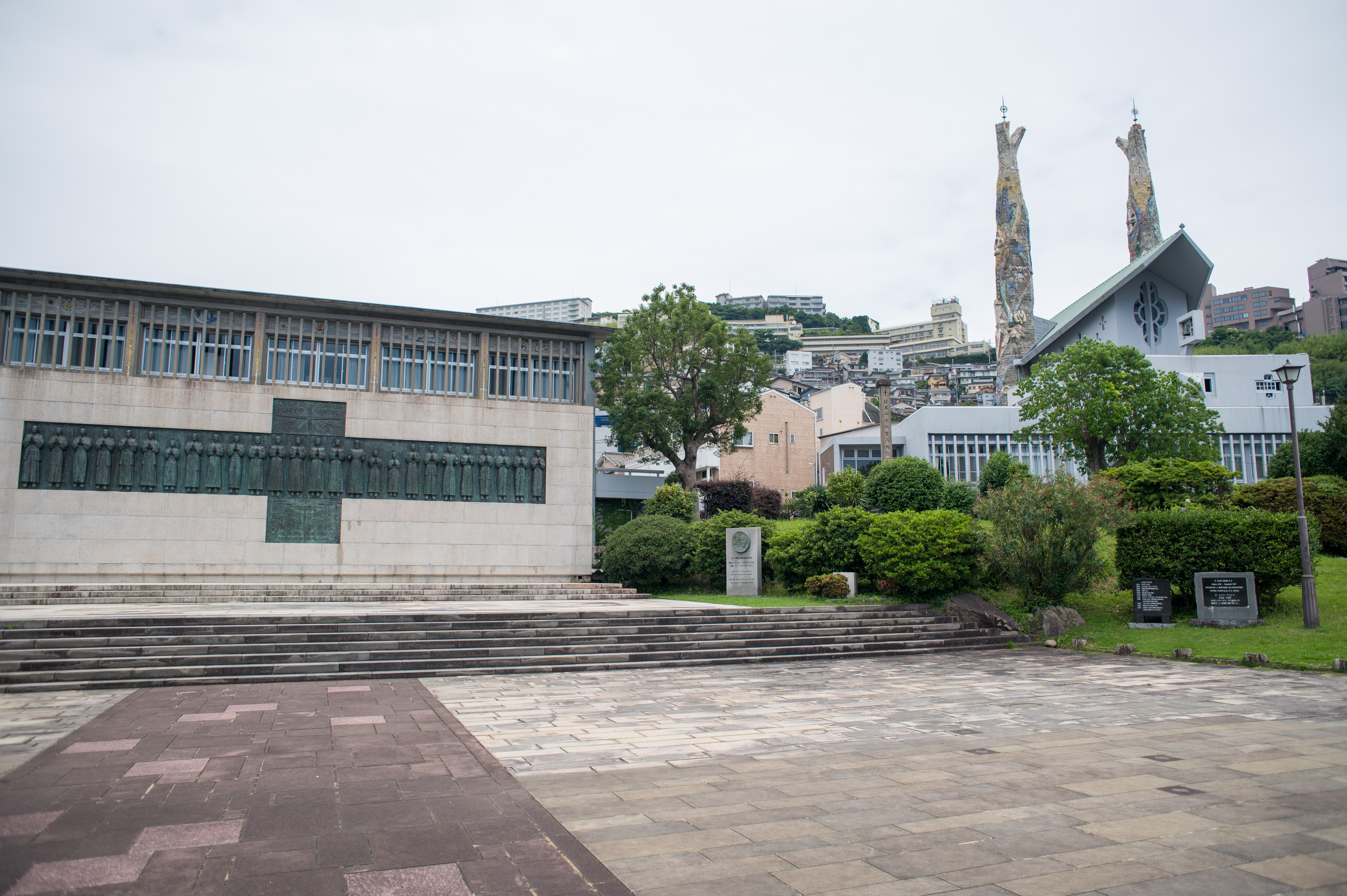
The 26 Martyrs Shrine, with St. Phillip Church in the background.

The Twenty-Six Martyrs Museum and Monument were built on Nishizaka Hill in Nagasaki, Japan in June 1962 to commemorate the 100th anniversary of the canonization by the Roman Catholic Church of the Christians executed on the site on February 5, 1597. The 26 people, a mixture of 20 native Japanese Christians and six foreign priests (four Spaniards, one Mexican and one Portuguese from India) had been arrested in Kyoto and Osaka on the order of Toyotomi Hideyoshi, the national ruler, for preaching Christianity. They were imprisoned, then later marched through the snow to Nagasaki, so that their execution might serve as a deterrent to Nagasaki's large Christian population. Hung up on 26 crosses with chains and ropes, the Christians were lanced to death in front of a large crowd on Nishizaka Hill. Paul Miki is said to have preached to the crowd from his cross.

The main theme inherent in both the museum and monument is "The Way to Nagasaki" – symbolising not only the physical trek to Nagasaki but also the Christian spirit of the martyrs. The museum's collection includes important historical articles from both Japan and Europe (such as original letters from the Jesuit priest St Francis Xavier) as well as modern artistic works on the early Christian period in Japan. The displays are arranged chronologically into three periods: the early Christian propagation, the martyrdoms, and the persistence of Christianity underground during the persecution.

The main monument with an extensive bronze depicting the Twenty-Six Martyrs, was designed by Japanese sculptor, Yasutake Funakoshi. The work took Funakoshi four years to complete.

The shrine and church were visited by Pope John Paul II in 1981 and Pope Francis in 2019.

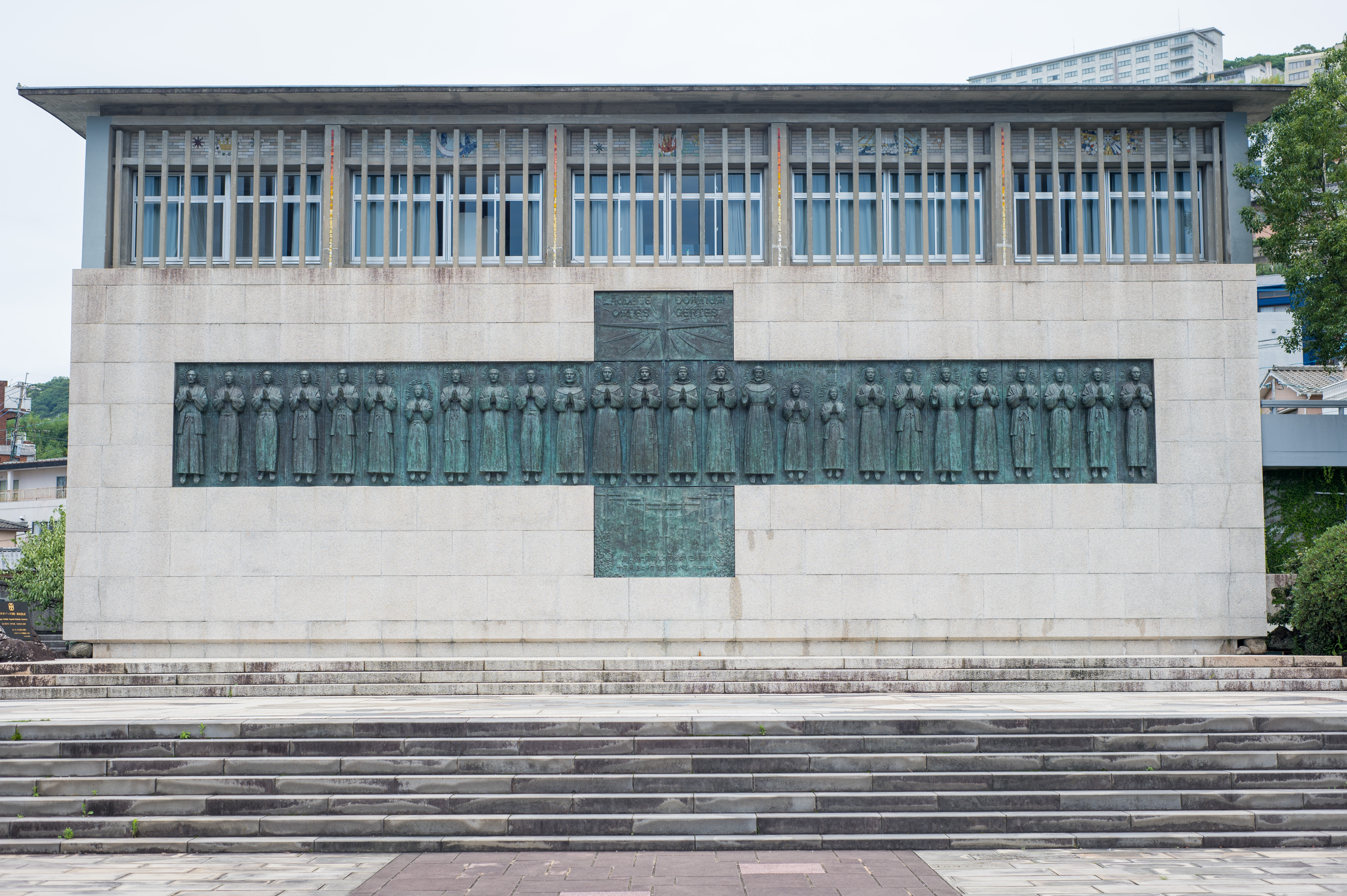
The Bronze 26 Martyrs Shrine in Nagasaki.

The exhibits include replica examples of "fumie" or treading images. Every year from 1629 to 1857, Nagasaki residents were forced to go through a ritual of stepping on bronze images of Christ or Mary to prove they were not Christians. Also to be seen are statues of the Virgin Mary in the guise of Buddhist deities such as Miroku (Hotei (Laughing Buddha)) and Kannon Bodhisattva to which the hidden Christians prayed.

The Martyrs' altar was built as a memorial for the many people who gave up their lives. The image of a plum blossom in the centre of the altar was chosen because the plum tree blossoms in February – the month of the martyrdom of the 26 saints, who are commemorated on February 6.

== St. Phillip Church ==
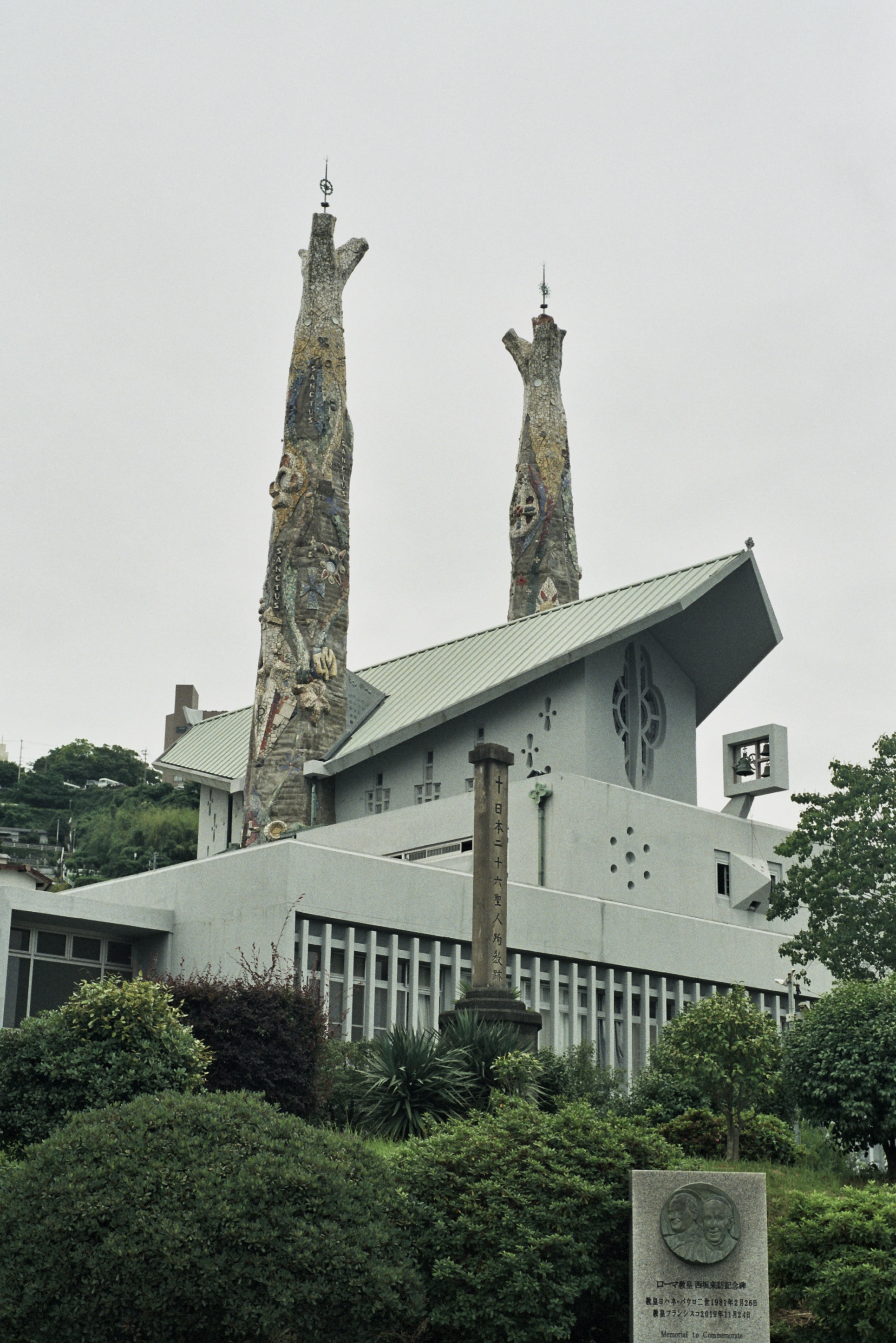
St. Phillip Nishizaka Church

On the site of the memorial. There is a church called St. Phillip Nishizaka, named for one of the 26 Martyrs. The church was designed by Imai Kenji in the style of the architect Antoni Gaudí. The church was built for the 100th anniversary of the canonization of the 26 Martyrs in 1962.

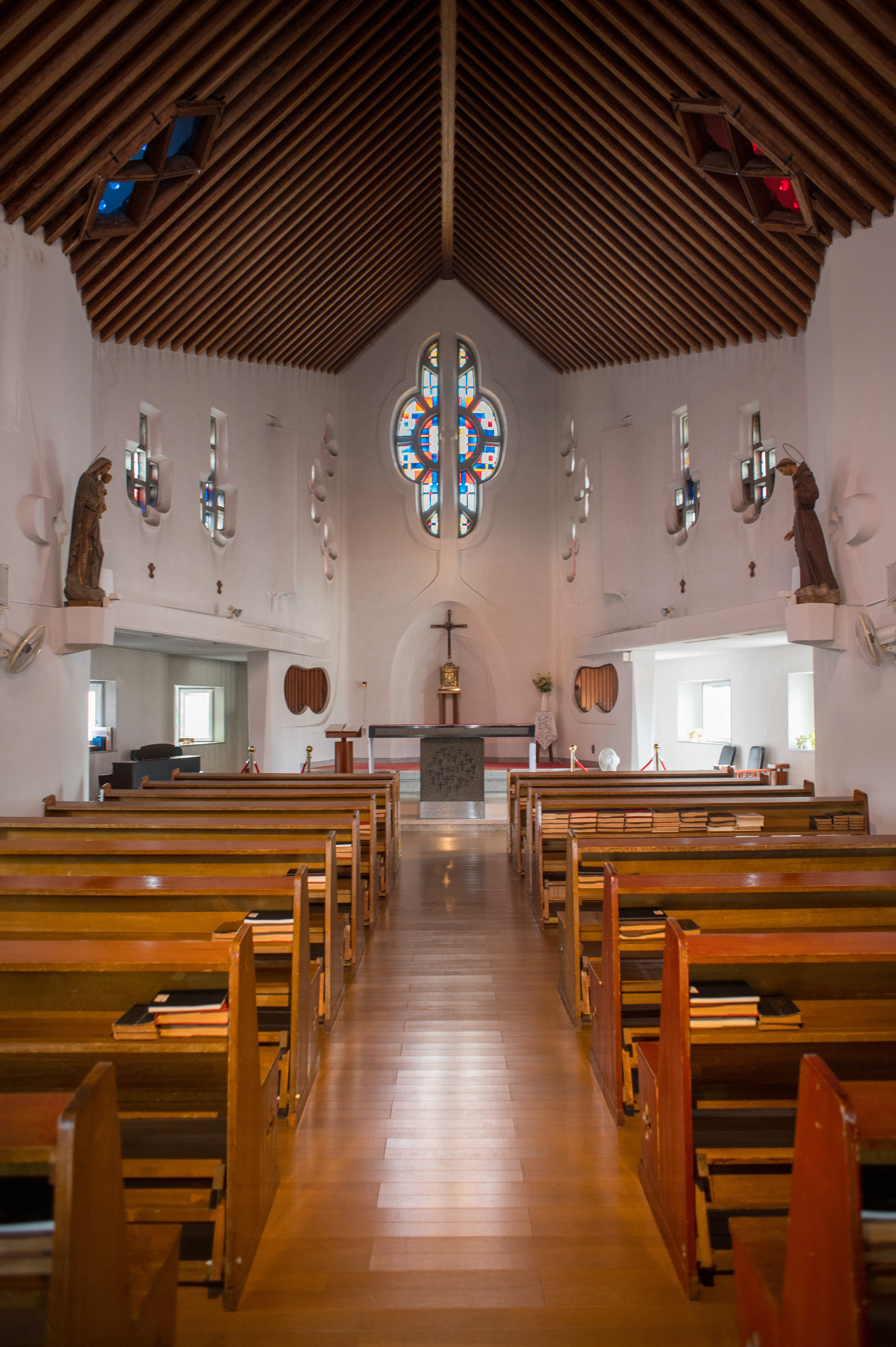
The Interior of the Church

== See also ==
- Buddhas of Bamyan
- Martyrs of Japan
- Church of Saint Mary of the Mongols
- National Shrine of the Divine Mercy (Philippines)
- Basilica of the Twenty-Six Holy Martyrs of Japan (Ōura Church)
- Twenty-six Martyrs of Japan
