= Philip of Jesus =

Novohispanic Catholic missionary

Saint Felipe de Jesús OFM
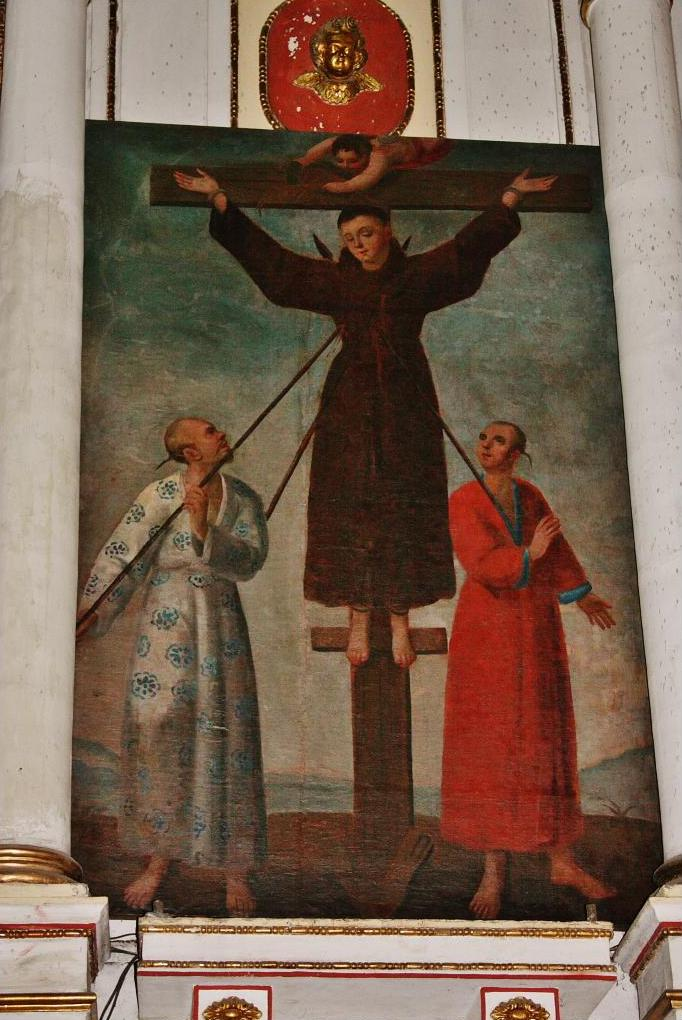
- Painting in the convent of Saint Anthony of Padua in Puebla.

Martyr
- Born: 1572; Mexico City, Viceroyalty of New Spain (now Mexico)
- Died: 5 February 1597 (aged 24–25); Nagasaki, Japan
- Cause of death: Asphyxia
- Venerated in: Roman Catholic Church
- Beatified: 14 September 1627, Vatican City by Pope Urban VIII
- Canonized: 8 June 1862, Vatican City by Pope Pius IX
- Feast: 5 February
- Attributes: spear, palm branch, cross
- Patronage: Mexico City; Colima (city); Nagasaki; Santa Cruz del Quiché; Ozatlán; El Viso del Alcor

Philip of Jesus, OFM (Spanish: Felipe de Jesús; 1572 – 1597) was a New Spanish Franciscan missionary who became one of the Twenty-six Martyrs of Japan. He is the first Mexican Catholic saint and is the patron saint of Mexico City.

== Life ==
Felipe de las Casas Ruiz was born in Mexico City in 1572; his parents had recently emigrated from Spain. He joined the Reformed Franciscans of the Province of St. Didacus, founded in Mexico by Peter Baptista, with whom he suffered martyrdom later. After some months in the Order, Philip grew tired of religious life, and left the Franciscans. He took up a mercantile career, and went to the Philippines, another Spanish colony, where he led a secular life. Later he desired to re-enter the Franciscans and was again admitted at Manila in 1590.

After some years it was determined that he was ready for ordination and sent to Mexico for this, since the episcopal see of Manila was vacant at that time, and thus no bishop was available locally to ordain him. He sailed on the San Felipe on 12 July 1596, but a storm drove the vessel upon the coast of Japan.

The governor of the province confiscated the ship and imprisoned its crew and passengers, among whom were Franciscan friar, Juan de Zamorra, as well as three other friars, two Augustinians and a Dominican. The discovery of soldiers, cannon and ammunition on the ship led to the suspicion that it was intended for the conquest of Japan, and that the missionaries were merely to prepare the way for the soldiers. This was also said by one of the crew, and it enraged the Japanese Taikō, Toyotomi Hideyoshi, generally called Taicosama by Europeans. In consequence, he commanded on December 8, 1596, the arrest of the Franciscans in the friary at Miako, now Kyoto, where Philip had gone.

The friars were all kept prisoners in the friary until 30 December, when they were transferred to the city prison. There were six Franciscan friars, seventeen Japanese Franciscan tertiaries and the Japanese Jesuit Paul Miki, with his two native servants. The ears of the prisoners were cropped on 3 January 1597, and they were paraded through the streets of Kyoto; on 21 January, they were taken to Osaka, and thence to Nagasaki, which they reached on 5 February 1597. They were taken to a mountain near Nagasaki city, "Mount of the Martyrs", bound upon crosses, after which they were pierced with spears.

The bones of Philip were brought to Mexico City in 1598.

== Beatification and canonization ==
Philip was beatified within the Roman Catholic church in 1627 by Urban VIII, and, with his companions, canonized 8 June, 1862, by Pius IX. He is the patron saint of Mexico City, the capital of Mexico as well as its largest city.

== In popular culture ==
In 1949, a Mexican film Philip of Jesus portrayed his life and death; it was directed by Julio Bracho with the actor Ernesto Alonso playing Philip.
