= San Felipe incident (1596) =

Spanish shipwreck in Japan with political consequences

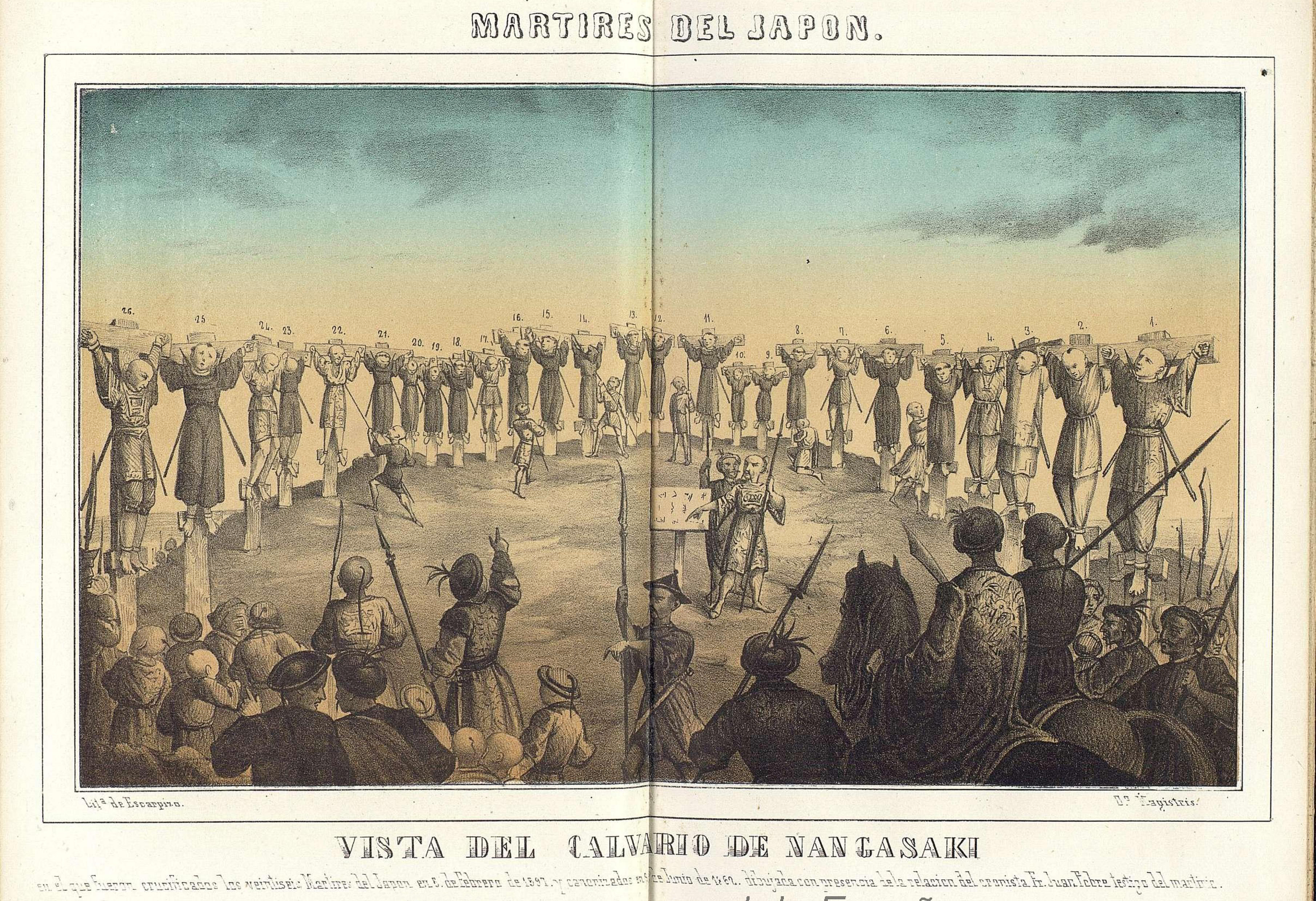
- The crucifixion of the 26 Christians in Nagasaki in 1597
- Date: October 19, 1596
- Location: Urado, Japan
- Type: Shipwreck
- Cause: Suspicion of infiltration (Note: Recent studies do not support the claim that threatening rhetoric, allegedly attributed to the navigator Francisco de Olandia, portraying missionaries as the "vanguard of invasion," was a cause of the seizure of the San Felipe’s cargo or the execution of the twenty-six martyrs. The claim lacks credibility due to the absence of surviving testimony or documents from Japanese, Spanish, and Portuguese primary sources, reliance on hearsay without direct witnesses, and inconsistencies between the Jesuit narrative and the accounts provided by the Spanish crew members.) (Note: In the period following the San Felipe incident (1596), the perspective, purportedly propagated by the Jesuits, that Franciscan missionary activities served as the "vanguard" of Spanish imperial conquest tends to oversimplify historical complexities. In the colonial endeavors of Portugal and Spain, missionary activities did not precede military conquest but rather followed it, and at times, they even conflicted with the political and military objectives of the empire. The concept of "spiritual conquest", thoroughly explored by French historian Robert Ricard in his 1933 study, analyzes the methods and dynamics of Christianization in Spanish and Portuguese America, challenging earlier simplistic interpretations. Recent scholarship has found little historical support for the view that missionaries acted as the "vanguard of invasion," and the hypothesis that Christianization preceded military and political conquest lacks academic endorsement. (Note: The Franciscan Order initiated missionary activities in Mexico in 1523, one year following the conquest of 1522. They adapted to indigenous languages and cultures, contributing to local societies through education and vocational training.) (Note: The Jesuit Order commenced missionary work in South America after 1570, approximately seventy years following Pedro Álvares Cabral’s arrival in Brazil in 1500. They established "reducciones" to govern and protect indigenous populations, yet faced tensions with Spanish settlers and, as evidenced by their expulsion in 1767, their objectives frequently diverged from those of the Spanish and Portuguese Empire.))
- Outcome: Crucifixion of 26 Christians
- Deaths: 26

On October 19, 1596, the Spanish ship San Felipe was shipwrecked on Urado in Kōchi on the Japanese island of Shikoku en route from Manila to Acapulco. The local daimyo Chōsokabe Motochika seized the cargo of the richly laden Manila galleon, and the incident escalated to Toyotomi Hideyoshi, ruling taikō of Japan. The pilot of the ship suggested to Japanese authorities that it was Spanish modus operandi to have missionaries infiltrate a country before an eventual military conquest, depicting the Spanish campaigns in the Americas and the Philippines in this way. (Note: Portugal's conquests of Goa and Malacca were strategic efforts to dominate the spice trade, not to pursue territorial colonization. Goa served as a military stronghold to counter Ottoman ambitions in the Indian Ocean, while Malacca's capture aimed to free imprisoned Portuguese delegates and retaliate against local rulers. As a small nation, Portugal prioritized securing trade routes, protecting assets, and monopolizing commerce over large-scale territorial expansion. Through fortified coastal outposts, advanced navigation, and naval mobility, Portugal established a commercial empire of strategically located fortifications and trading posts, effectively controlling maritime trade routes despite its limited manpower.) This led to the crucifixion of 26 Christians in Nagasaki, the first lethal persecution of Christians by the state in Japan. The executed were later known as the Twenty-Six Martyrs of Japan.

== Background ==
Soon after the first contacts in 1543, Portuguese ships started to arrive in Japan to trade. At the time, the Japanese desired Chinese goods such as silk and porcelain, but had been prohibited from private trade with China by the Ming dynasty as a punishment for wokou pirate raids. The Portuguese were therefore able to act as intermediaries trading Chinese goods for Japanese silver, and profited immensely.

The Nanban trade, as this Euro-Japanese activity came to be called, was closely tied to the propagation of Christianity. Portuguese-sponsored Jesuits took the lead in proselytizing Japan, and the fait accompli was approved in Pope Gregory XIII's papal bull of 1575, which declared that Japan belonged to the Portuguese Diocese of Macau. The Jesuits' exclusive right to propagate Christianity in Japan meant that their sponsors, the Portuguese, had the exclusive right to trade with Japan within Christendom.

The Christian mission in Japan enjoyed early success among the warring daimyo of the Sengoku period, because Portuguese traders were more likely to visit ports belonging to a Christian lord, which for the daimyo meant easier access to European firearms. This situation gradually changed as Toyotomi Hideyoshi came close to unifying Japan and became concerned about potential decentralizing factors, such as vassals following a foreign religion. In 1587, after a cordial audience with Gaspar Coelho, Superior of the Jesuit mission, Hideyoshi became yet more concerned as Coelho boasted that the Jesuits could summon Portuguese warships and rally Christian daimyo for Hideyoshi's upcoming invasion of Korea. No more than two weeks later, on July 24, Hideyoshi ordered the expulsion of the Jesuit missionaries from Japan. It was not strictly enforced, though, and Hideyoshi himself allowed Jesuits into Japan as translators and trade agents. Eventually the missionaries felt safe enough to continue their proselytising in Japan, albeit discreetly.

Despite the union of the Spanish and Portuguese crowns in 1580 stipulating that Spain would not interfere with Portugal's colonial empire, Spanish-sponsored missionaries of the Franciscan Order viewed Portugal's success in Japan with jealousy and sought to disrupt the Jesuit monopoly in Japan. These friars entered Japan via the Philippines in 1593, and an initial audience with Hideyoshi was deemed encouraging enough that they began to preach openly near the capital Kyoto. The Jesuits immediately protested this disregard of the 1587 edict, but the Franciscans, convinced of the soundness of their methods after their successes in the Americas, paid the warnings no heed.

== Wreck of San Felipe ==
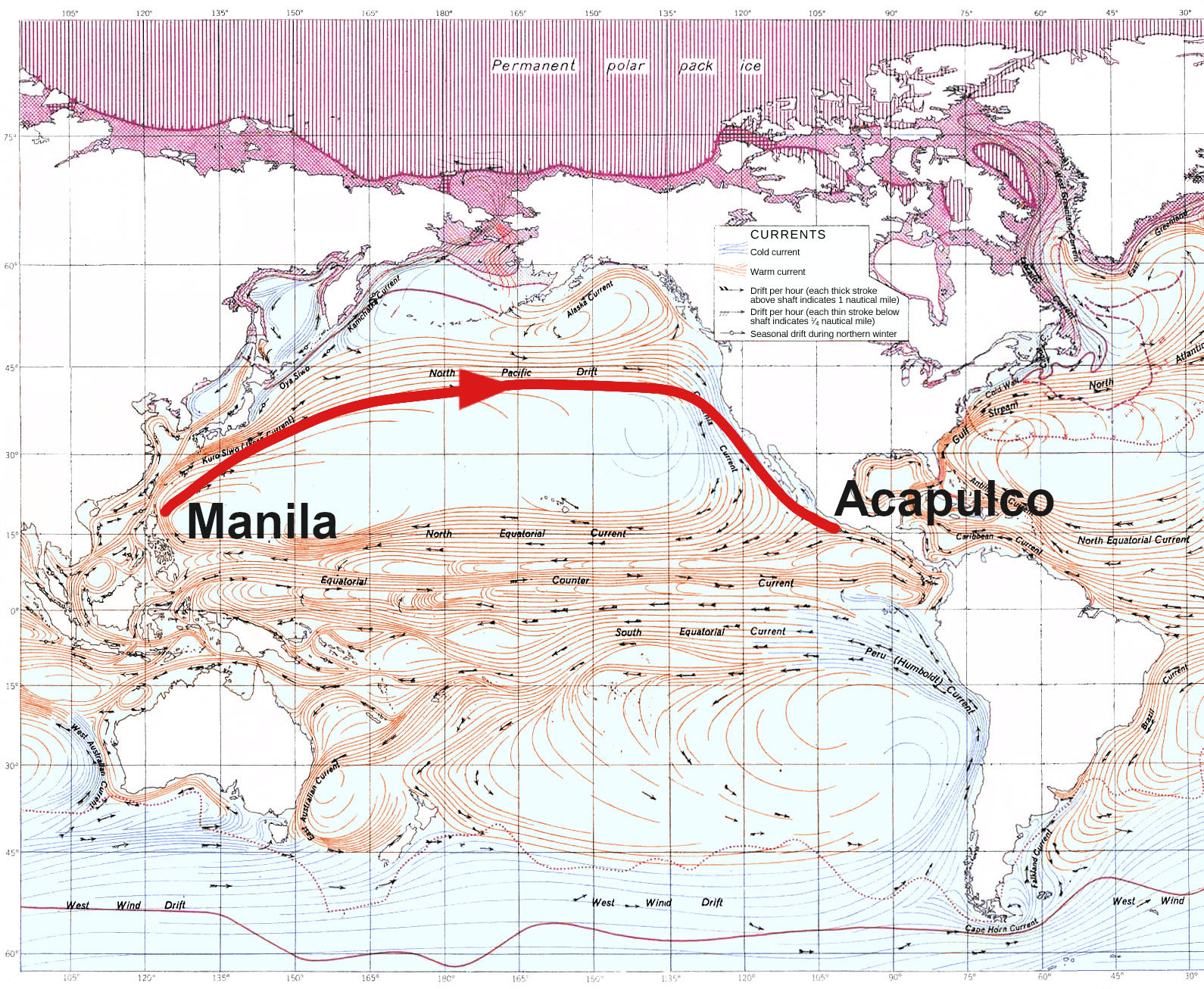
Northerly trade route as used by eastbound Manila galleons

On July 12, 1596, the Spanish ship San Felipe set sail from Manila to Acapulco under captain Matías de Landecho with a cargo that was estimated to be worth over 1 million pesos. This relatively late departure of the Manila galleon meant San Felipe sailed during the Pacific typhoon season. After being hit by two typhoons, the captain decided to sail towards Japan to refit, but on the approach to the Japanese coast the galleon was hit by a third typhoon, leaving the ship without sails. Thanks to the Kuroshio current, the ship drifted towards Japan, a happenstance that the crew considered a miracle. They sighted land on the latitude of Kyoto, but could not land in the strong winds and drifted further. Amid fears of the uncontrollable ship crashing onto the rocks, San Felipe approached the coast of Tosa Province on Shikoku on October 19, 1596.

Having heard of Hideyoshi's hospitality to the friars, the captain felt safe enough to turn down a suggestion from his crew to make their way to the friendly port of Nagasaki, center of the Nanban trade. The local daimyo Chōsokabe Motochika, however, was unfriendly to the foreigners and forced the disabled ship to his home port of Urado (浦戸; in present-day Kōchi) with 200 armed boats. On arrival it wrecked on a sandbar. The Chōsokabe samurai then confiscated the remaining 600,000 pesos worth of cargo on board – the rest had already been lost in the stormy voyage. Chōsokabe Motochika claimed this was standard procedure, as it was his understanding of the Japanese maritime law that any vessel stranded or wrecked in Japan belonged, with its cargo, to the local authorities. He may also have been tempted by the cargo itself, since the Nanban trade and the wealth associated with it rarely reached Shikoku.

When the Spanish crew protested, Motochika suggested that they take their case to Hideyoshi, the de facto head of government, and seek help from his personal friend Mashita Nagamori, one of the five commissioners under Hideyoshi. Captain Landecho acted upon the advice and sent two of his officers to the capital Kyoto, with instructions that they should meet with Franciscan friars and avoid dealing with the Jesuits.

== Interview and reaction ==
Chōsokabe Motochika's recommendation proved to be of dubious faith, as Mashita Nagamori saw profit to be made from the situation, and advised Hideyoshi to keep the cargo for the court treasury. The Jesuits caught wind of the matter and offered to intercede on behalf of the Spanish crew, suggesting the services of another of the five commissioners, the Christian sympathiser Maeda Gen'i; but the Franciscan commissary in Kyoto, Pedro Bautista, refused. By the time Maeda Gen'i was contacted, Mashita Nagamori was already on his way to the wreck and Maeda could do no more than to write a letter to his colleague urging leniency.

When Nagamori reached Tosa, he asked for a monetary bribe from the Spaniards; failing that, he set about loading San Felipe's freight onto a hundred Japanese boats to ship to Kyoto. While this was going on, Nagamori acquainted himself with the Spaniards, who entertained him with music and games and a show of fencing. He then asked Pilot Major Francisco de Olandia where they came from and how they came to Japan. At this point Olandia produced a map showing the extent of the Spanish colonial empire, and insinuated that Spain gained its empire by first converting native populations to Christianity with missionaries and then sending in conquistadors to join the newly converted in an invasion of conquest. Nagamori then inquired about the relationship between Spain and Portugal, and was indignant when the pilot and the ensign of the ship both replied that the two empires shared one king (the Jesuits had long explained to the Japanese that the two countries were different and separate).

This exchange was duly reported to Hideyoshi, who reacted with fury. The pilot's revelation was a confirmation of Hideyoshi's suspicions of Christians as "fifth columnists" in Japan, which had been fanned by his anti-Christian retainers. He responded quickly, ordering all the missionaries in Japan to be rounded up. Ishida Mitsunari, first among the five commissioners under Hideyoshi, clarified that Hideyoshi's order was directed towards the Franciscans that openly violated his 1587 edict – the Jesuits, who were discreet in their preaching, were excluded. In the end, 26 Catholics – six Franciscan friars, 17 Japanese Franciscan tertiaries, and three Japanese Jesuits included by mistake – were paraded from Kyoto to Nagasaki, where they were crucified on a hill on February 5, 1597. A passenger of San Felipe, the friar Philip of Jesus, was among the martyrs.

== Discussion on the cause of the incident ==
Some studies do not support the notion of a Christian fifth column, as it lacks corroboration from primary sources. Given that the actual charge was one of lèse-majesté, rather than a formal prosecution for conspiring to undermine state security – and that the punishment appears directed at reinforcing sovereign authority rather than eradicating Christian missionaries – it may have been exactly what it claimed to be. Furthermore, competing explanations regarding the Franciscans' cargo appear more consistent with the absence of primary source testimony.

=== Veracity of de Olandia's claims ===
No primary sources confirm Pilot Major Francisco de Olandia's testimony, and tensions between Portuguese Jesuits and Spanish Franciscans intensified, with each blaming the other for the martyrdoms. (Note: For the Japanese missionaries, 1597 was an eventful year. Far from being assuaged by the Nagasaki martyrdoms as might have been hoped, the acrimony between the Spaniards and the Portuguese, and between the Franciscans and the Jesuits, only intensified as charges and countercharges were freely exchanged. Each side blamed the other for the seizure of San Felipe and the subsequent mass execution at Nagasaki. According to the Portuguese, the Spanish pilot’s boasting had angered Hideyoshi, prompting him to drastic action. Not so, said the Spaniards: the real reason was that the Portuguese had spread the word that the Spaniards were robbers and pirates. The religious orders joined in the dreary controversy. According to the Jesuits, the friars had ignored all warning signs, and their public preaching had brought trouble on upon their own Jesuits’ hands. The Franciscans answered that the Jesuits had maligned them in court.) Concerns about a Christian 'fifth column' were overstated, as Portuguese Macau and Spanish Manila lacked the resources and influence to pose a significant threat to Japan. Whether Toyotomi Hideyoshi genuinely believed in these unrealistic threats remains a subject of academic debate. (Note: Thus, Hideyoshi must have been informed that Spanish missionaries had formed a fifth column and prepared the way for colonial conquest. Whether he believed this is another matter. Certainly his fears for national security of Japan were exaggerated, as neither the Portuguese in Macau nor the Spaniards at Manila were even in a remote position to challenge Japan. Persecution happened from time to time after the martyrdoms. This led to hard times for all missionaries in Japan, even during Ieyasu’s reign when Portuguese-Japanese trade was promoted. The mission in Japan progressed from bad to worse, hitting rock bottom in 1614 when Ieyasu issued an expulsion decree ordering all missionaries to leave Japan. From then on, Japan closed the door to the outside world.)

According to Luis Frois's History of Japan, before the 1587 Edict of Expulsion and prior to the San Felipe incident, Toyotomi Hideyoshi suspected that missionaries were conspiring to use Christian daimyo to conquer Japan, alleging they employed sophisticated knowledge and cunning methods to win over Japanese nobles and elites with a unity stronger than the Ikkō sect, aiming to occupy and conquer Japan. (Note: The political rhetoric depicting religious minorities as "vanguards of invasion" parallels claims regarding the unsuccessful assimilation of the Moriscos, providing a justification for the Iberian Inquisition and expulsions, a concept well-known to Iberians. Philip II claimed that the Moriscos acted as "vanguards of invasion" by allegedly supporting the Ottoman Empire or Protestant forces, yet such assertions lacked substantial evidence and have been widely regarded as exaggerated.) Frois's account is not definitive history but reflects Jesuit perspectives on Hideyoshi's suspicions. Historian Elisonas notes Hideyoshi's skepticism toward Coelho's casual admission of the authority he held over the Christian daimyo. The concern that Christians were being used as "vanguards of invasion" stemmed from a widely circulated conspiracy theory, as evidenced in a 1578 letter by Luís Fróis. According to Boxer, this conspiracy theory had been propagated by monks since at least 1570. While figures such as Ōtomo and Oda Nobunaga dismissed it outright, Boxer speculates that Hideyoshi may have been influenced by such theories.

Spanish merchants alleged that the Jesuits, including Pedro Martins, Gnecchi-Soldo Organtino, and João Rodrigues Tçuzu, had described Spaniards to Hideyoshi's minister as pirates and the Spanish king as a tyrant, claims Rodrigues denied. These accusations and the Jesuits' perception of Hideyoshi's suspicions may have led the Jesuits to craft self-defensive narratives, a possibility that remains plausible. Elison (Elisonas) argues that the Franciscan account is more plausible, but acknowledges that its veracity cannot be definitively confirmed.

=== Nanbanji temple as the catalyst for Hideyoshi's lèse-majesté crackdown ===
Hideyoshi's execution of the 26 Christians in Nagasaki, known as the 26 Martyrs of Japan, was triggered by a lavish Franciscan church in Kyoto, as it is seen as lèse-majesty. He initially sought to punish 170 Christians, but this target was later reduced to 26. The church, known as a Nanbanji temple in Japanese, was dismantled, but smaller churches remained, and no further major restrictions were imposed, indicating Hideyoshi's focus was on asserting his authority, not eradicating Christianity, mirroring his approach to Buddhist institutions. The notion of a Christian fifth column lacks strong evidence, as the charge was specifically lèse-majesty, not a broader conspiratorial threat.

=== Provocation of Hideyoshi's authority assertion by Franciscan cargo claim ===
In a 1594 letter to the Governor-General of the Philippines, Toyotomi Hideyoshi guaranteed safe passage for travelers between the Philippines and Japan, by sea or land, ensuring their property would not be seized. He urged the Governor-General to trust the accounts of visitors, including priests, who had directly experienced Japan's generous hospitality. However, during the San Felipe incident, Hideyoshi confiscated the ship's cargo and ignored the captain and crew's demands for restitution, thereby breaking his prior assurances. This decision risked undermining his authority, presenting a complex dilemma. Reinier H. Hesselink interprets that Hideyoshi's anger was triggered when Bautista of the Franciscan order claimed most of the ship's cargo belonged to the Franciscans, leading to the execution of Bautista and others. Effectively, Hideyoshi seized property Bautista claimed as Franciscan-owned, leveraging the 1587 Edict of Expulsion as a pretext to target Bautista. This calculated action safeguarded his lucrative Nanban trade while exploiting Jesuit-Franciscan rivalries to consolidate political control.

=== Financial pressures driving the San Felipe cargo seizure ===
In The Christian Century in Japan (1951), Charles Ralph Boxer suggests that Toyotomi Hideyoshi's seizure of the San Felipe's cargo was primarily driven by acute financial distress, a factor often underemphasized by historians. Hideyoshi's extravagant spending and the substantial costs of his Korean campaigns precipitated a severe fiscal crisis, intensified by the need to expand military operations. The September 1596 earthquakes, which ravaged Fushimi Castle and the Gokinai region, further depleted his strained resources. Against this backdrop, Boxer posits that Hideyoshi was receptive to proposals from advisors, such as Masuda and Seyakuinn Hoin, who portrayed the San Felipe's cargo as a providential means to offset fiscal losses. (Note: "In these circumstances, even his own very considerable resources were strained to the utmost, and he therefore gave an attentive ear to the joint proposals of Masuda, and the Jesuit's old enemy, the court physician (and pimp) Seyakuin Hoin, that now was the time to recoup the losses by confiscating the San Felipe's cargo, which representented obviously a gift from the gods.")

Boxer also explores the possibility that Hideyoshi leveraged allegations of a "fifth column" threat – potentially fueled by the testimony of the Spanish Pilot Major, Francisco de Olandia, and conspiracy theories circulating since as early as 1570 – as a pretext to justify the confiscation, (Note: "This allegation either gave him the pretext for which he was seeking...") or alternatively, acted solely on the advisors' conspirational arguments. (Note: This is likely based on the reports of the Jesuit missionary Luís Fróis. According to Fróis, Nagamori Mashita maliciously slandered Spanish sailors, alleging that Christian missionaries were covertly operating as spies under the guise of religion. This accusation of espionage, combined with malicious denunciations by Sayakuin Zenshū, contributed to the instigation of persecution against Christians through reports made to Toyotomi Hideyoshi. In Fróis’s accounts, the claims of the magistrate lack concrete evidence and are portrayed as defamatory assertions rooted in malice.) However, Boxer highlights a discrepancy: eyewitness Fray Juan Pobre asserted that the seizure was decided before the pilot's interrogation, contradicting Jesuit accounts. (Note: Boxer's work is considered somewhat obsolete today due to the lack of primary sources substantiating Francisco de Olandia’s testimony.)

== Aftermath ==
Captain Landecho, who went to Osaka himself in a bid to reclaim San Felipe's cargo, was told there that Hideyoshi had reason to treat him as a pirate to be executed, but instead he was granted his life and be allowed to leave Japan with the crew and passengers of San Felipe, although the black slaves on board were recruited into Hideyoshi's service. Part of the confiscated cargo was used to finance the Japanese invasion of Korea, and the rest distributed among the Japanese nobility – some items even found their way to the Emperor of Japan.

The blame for the San Felipe mishap was hotly debated by the rival religious orders. The account of the friars who escaped martyrdom downplayed the statement by the pilot, while accusing the Jesuits of inaction, and worse, treachery. The Spaniards alleged that the Portuguese-sponsored Jesuits were the instigators of the incident as they urged Hideyoshi to seize the cargo, denounced the Spaniards as pirates and conquistadors, and insulted the Spanish king despite the fact that Portugal was under a personal union with Spain at the time. The Jesuits formally denied all these claims, instead pinning the blame on the Franciscan friars' recklessness in Japan that destroyed any previous goodwill Hideyoshi had shown: the pilot's slip-of-the-tongue only gave Hideyoshi an opportunity to act on his pre-existing suspicions. These debates and the exaggerated stories surrounding the San Felipe episode were spread across the Spanish colonial empire and resulted in much resentment against Portugal and the Jesuits.

Along with the martyrdom of the 26 Christians, the San Felipe incident set off a new round of persecution against the Christians, in which 137 churches were demolished and the Jesuit missionaries were ordered to leave Japan in 1598. The Jesuits made a show of compliance by loading a Macau-bound carrack vessel with ordinary Portuguese in missionary wear, then continued to evangelize in Japan discreetly until Hideyoshi's death in 1598.

=== Hideyoshi's alleged invasion plans for the Philippines ===
In February 1597, Martín de la Ascensión, one of the 26 martyrs executed, wrote to the Philippine governor, warning of his impending execution and Hideyoshi's invasion plans. He noted, "(Hideyoshi) is preoccupied with the Koreans this year and cannot go to Luzon, but he intends to do so next year". Martín also described the invasion route: "He plans to occupy the Ryukyus and Taiwan, deploy troops to Cagayan, and, if God does not intervene, advance from there to Manila". The renewal of the Bateren Expulsion Edict reignited Spanish concerns in the Philippines about a potential invasion by Hideyoshi.
