= Francisco Blanco (martyr) =

Spanish Franciscan missionary and saint (c. 1570 – 1597)

Saint Francisco Blanco O.F.M.
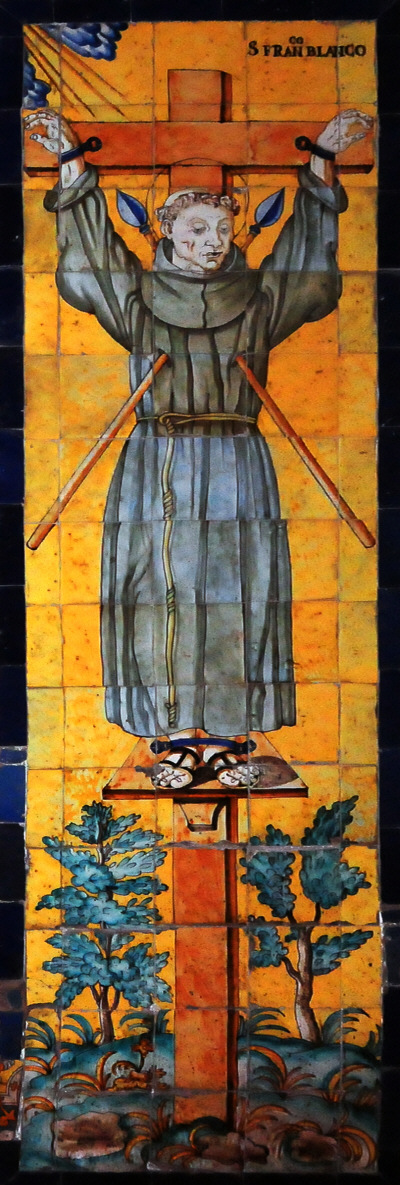
- Painting of Blanco's crucifixion from Lima, Peru

Martyr
- Born: c. 1570; Ourense, Spain
- Died: 5 February 1597; Nagasaki, Japan
- Venerated in: Catholic Church
- Beatified: 15 September 1627, Rome by Pope Urban VIII
- Canonized: 8 June 1862, Rome by Pope Pius IX
- Feast: 5 or 6 February
- Attributes: Franciscan habit, crossed spears

Francisco Blanco, OFM was a Spanish Catholic Franciscan missionary and martyr, one of the Twenty-six Martyrs of Japan (日本二十六聖人, Nihon Nijūroku Seijin). He is revered as a saint by the Catholic Church, particularly in Japan.

== Biography ==
Blanco was born in Ourense, Galicia, and originally studied with the Jesuits in Monterrei. After moving to Castile and León he became a novice with the Franciscan order in Villalpando.

Following a calling to cross-cultural mission, he migrated to Mexico, where he was ordained a priest. In 1593, he moved to the Philippines. And in 1596 he travelled, with his teacher Martin of the Ascension, to Japan.

== Martyrdom ==
Toyotomi Hideyoshi, began persecuting Catholics in fear of growing European influence. On 8 December 1596 Blanco was among a large number of Christians in Kyoto who were arrested and had part of their left ears cut off. On 4 January 1597 they were sent on a forced march 966 kilometres (600 miles) to Nagasaki. The following day Blanco and Twenty-five other Christian men and boys (including 20 Japanese, 3 Europeans, a Mexican and an Indian) were executed for preaching Christianity, an act prohibited by Japanese law. They were crucified and pierced with spears on Nishizaka Hill and their bodies remained exposed.

== Legacy ==
All of the martyrs were beatified on 14 September 1627 by Pope Urban VIII and canonized by Pope Pius IX in 1862.

When religious freedom was reestablished in Japan under Meiji Restoration in 1868, about 30,000 members of the underground Kakure Kirishitan or "Hidden Christian" church came out of hiding.

In June 1962 the Twenty-Six Martyrs Museum and Monument were built on Nishizaka Hill to commemorate the 100th anniversary of their canonization.

A skull relic of Blanco is preserved in O Barco de Valdeorras, Ourense.

== See also ==
- Twenty-six Martyrs of Japan
