= Oura Church =

Coordinates: 32°44′03″N 129°52′13″E

Basilica of the Twenty-Six Holy Martyrs of Japan
- 日本二十六聖殉教者聖堂
- Basilica of the Twenty-Six Holy Martyrs of Japan
- Location: Nagasaki
- Country: Japan
- Denomination: Catholic
- Tradition: Latin Rite

History
- Dedication: 26 Martyrs of Japan

Architecture
- Style: Gothic Revival
- Completed: 1864

Administration
- Archdiocese: Archdiocese of Nagasaki
- World Heritage Site National Treasure National Historic Site of Japan

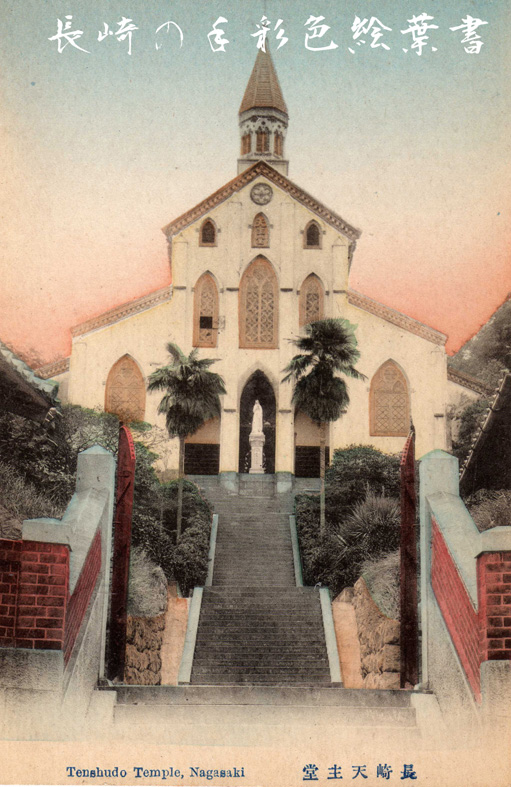
Oura Tenshudo Temple, Hand-tinted Postcard (Meiji)

The Oura Church (大浦天主堂, Ōura Tenshudō) or Oura Cathedral, officially the Basilica of the Twenty-Six Holy Martyrs of Japan (日本二十六聖殉教者聖堂), is a Catholic minor basilica and co-cathedral in Nagasaki, Japan, built soon after the end of the Japanese government's Seclusion Policy in 1853. It is named after the 26 Japanese Martyrs. For many years it was the only Western-style building declared a national treasure, and is said to be the oldest Christian church in Japan.

== History ==
Panorama of the church and the surrounding Minamiyamate district

In December 1862, two French priests from the Société des Missions Étrangères, Fathers Louis Furet and Bernard Petitjean, were assigned from Yokohama to Nagasaki with the intention of building a church honoring the Twenty-Six Martyrs of Japan (eight European priests, one Mexican priest and seventeen Japanese Christians who were crucified in 1597 by order of Toyotomi Hideyoshi) who had been canonized the same year. They arrived in Nagasaki in 1863 and the church was finished in 1864. Constructed by the master carpenter of the Glover Residence, Koyama Hidenoshin, it was originally a small wooden church with three aisles and three octagonal towers. The present structure is a much larger Gothic basilica that dates from around 1878. This version was built of white stuccoed brick with five aisles, vaulted ceilings, and one octagonal tower. The design most likely came from a Belgian plan used by Catholic missionaries in an earlier church built in Osaka. The stained glass windows were imported from France. The church was officially a chapel for the French foreign community in Japan per the Treaty of Amity and Commerce between France and Japan, as Christianity was still officially outlawed by the Tokugawa shogunate.The dedication ceremony was attended by foreign residents, as well as the captains of French, Russian, British, and Dutch ships anchored in Nagasaki Port, each accompanied by several Catholic sailors.

On March 17, 1865, shortly after the completion of the original cathedral, Father Petitjean saw a group of people standing in front of the cathedral. They indicated to the priest that they wanted him to open the doors. As the priest knelt at the altar, an old woman from the group approached him and said "The heart (faith) of all of us is the same as yours. Where is the statue of Holy Mary?" Petitjean discovered that these people were from the nearby village of Urakami and were Kakure Kirishitans, descendants of early Japanese Christians who went into hiding after the Shimabara Rebellion in the 1630s. A white marble statue of the Virgin Mary was imported from France and erected in the church to commemorate this event. The bronze relief in the courtyard below the church shows the memorable scene of the discovery. Before long, tens of thousands of underground Christians came out of hiding in the Nagasaki area. News of this reached Pope Pius IX, who declared this "the miracle of the Orient."

The building underwent a large-scale expansion and renovation from 1875 to 1891, during which the exterior walls were rebuilt with brick, giving the building a completely Gothic style, and the appearance was greatly changed from the original appearance. The new church, consecrated on May 22, 1879, was the first in Kyushu to be built with brick, as opposed to the original wooden structure. In 1891 it was designated the cathedral of the Catholic Diocese of Nagasaki (now the Catholic Archdiocese of Nagasaki).

Ōura Cathedral was designated as a National Treasure in 1933. During World War II, the cathedral was damaged by the atomic bomb on August 9, 1945, but avoided collapse and burning due to being relatively far from the hypocenter. Artifacts from the damage are in the Nagasaki Atomic Bomb Museum.

The National Treasure designation was affirmed on March 31, 1953, under the 1951 Law for the Protection of Cultural Properties. It was the first Western-style building in Japan to be given this honor and remained the only one until 2009 when the neo-Baroque Akasaka Palace was designated a National Treasure. In 2012, the precincts of the Ōura Cathedral were designated a National Historic Site.

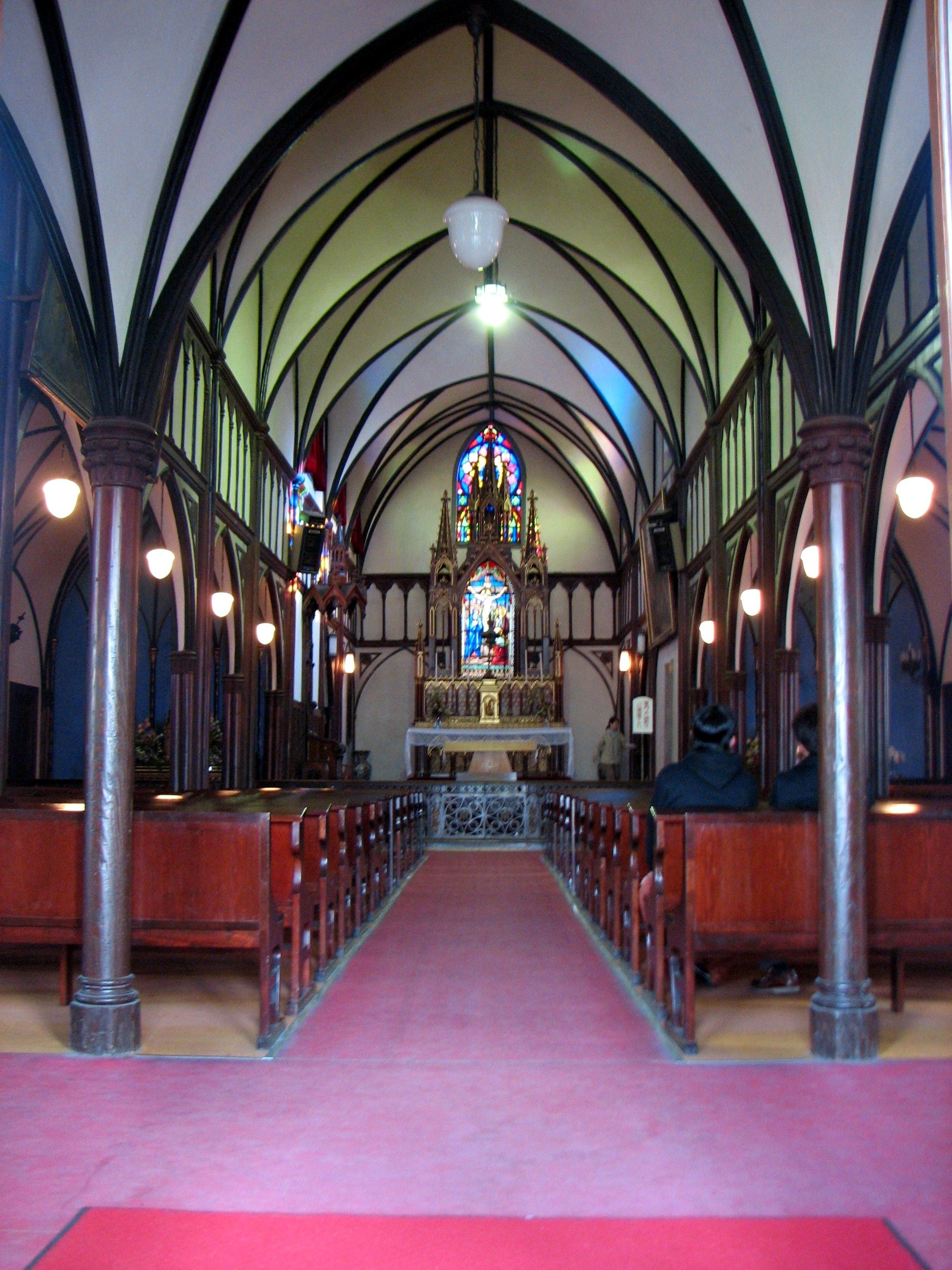
Inside of Ōura Church

The church was granted status as a minor basilica by the Holy See on April 26, 2016.

On June 30, 2018, Ōura Cathedral, along with 11 other sites linked to Catholic persecution in Japan, was added to the UNESCO World Heritage List.

== See also ==
- Christianity in Japan
- Twenty-Six Martyrs Museum and Monument
- Hidden Christian Sites in the Nagasaki Region
- List of Historic Sites of Japan (Nagasaki)
