= Veit Erbermann =

German theologian and controversialist

Veit Erbermann (or Ebermann) (born on 25 May 1597 – died on 8 April 1675) was a German theologian and controversialist.

== Biography ==
He was born at Rendweisdorff, in Bavaria, to Lutheran parents, but at an early age he became a Roman Catholic, and on 30 May 1620, entered the Society of Jesus. After completing his ecclesiastical studies he taught Scholastic theology, first at Mainz and afterwards at Würzburg. Subsequently, he was appointed rector of the pontifical seminary at Fulda, which position he held for seven years.

His theological attainments and zeal for Catholicism brought him into conflict with many of the leading Reformers of his time. He watched with a keen interest what in Protestant theological circles is known as "Syncretistic Controversy", and in his frequent encounters with its chief representatives proved himself an able champion of Catholicism.

== Works ==
His principal works are:

- Anatomia Callixtina (Mainz, 1644)
- Irenicon Catholicum (2 vols., Mainz, 1645–46), in which he examines critically the religious tenets of George Calixtus
- Interrogationes apologeticae (Würzburg, 1651)
- Examen Examinis Conringiani (Würzburg, 1644), an exposition of the infallibility of the Catholic Church against Hermann Conring
- Anti-Musaeus, i.e. parallela Ecclessiae verae et falsae (Würzburg, 1659)
- Anti-Musaei pars altera (Würzburg, 1661)
- Nervi sine mole
- Asserta theologica de fide divina (Würzburg, 1665).
