= Alvise Contarini (diplomat) =

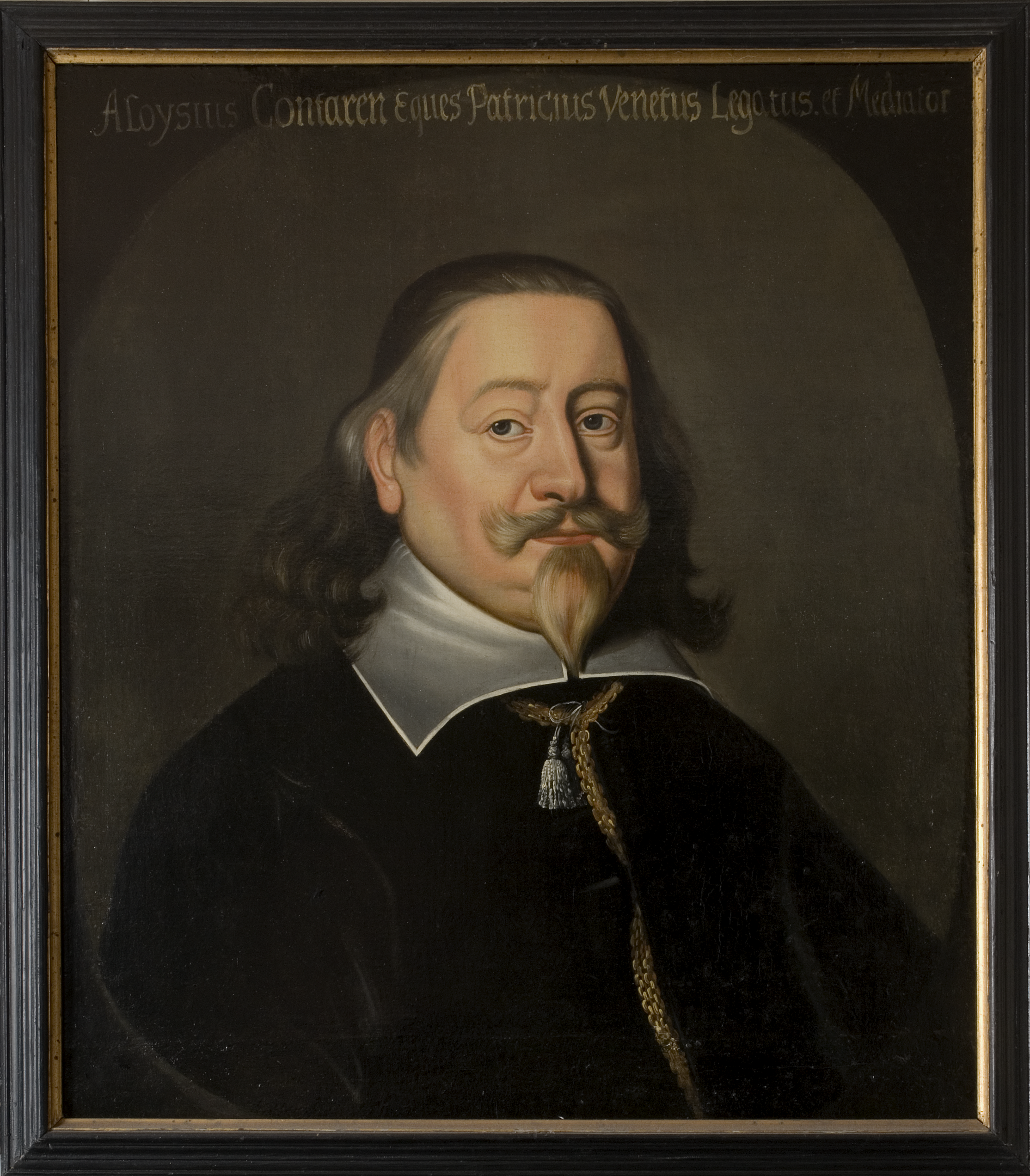
Portrait of Alvise Contarini after Anselm van Hulle

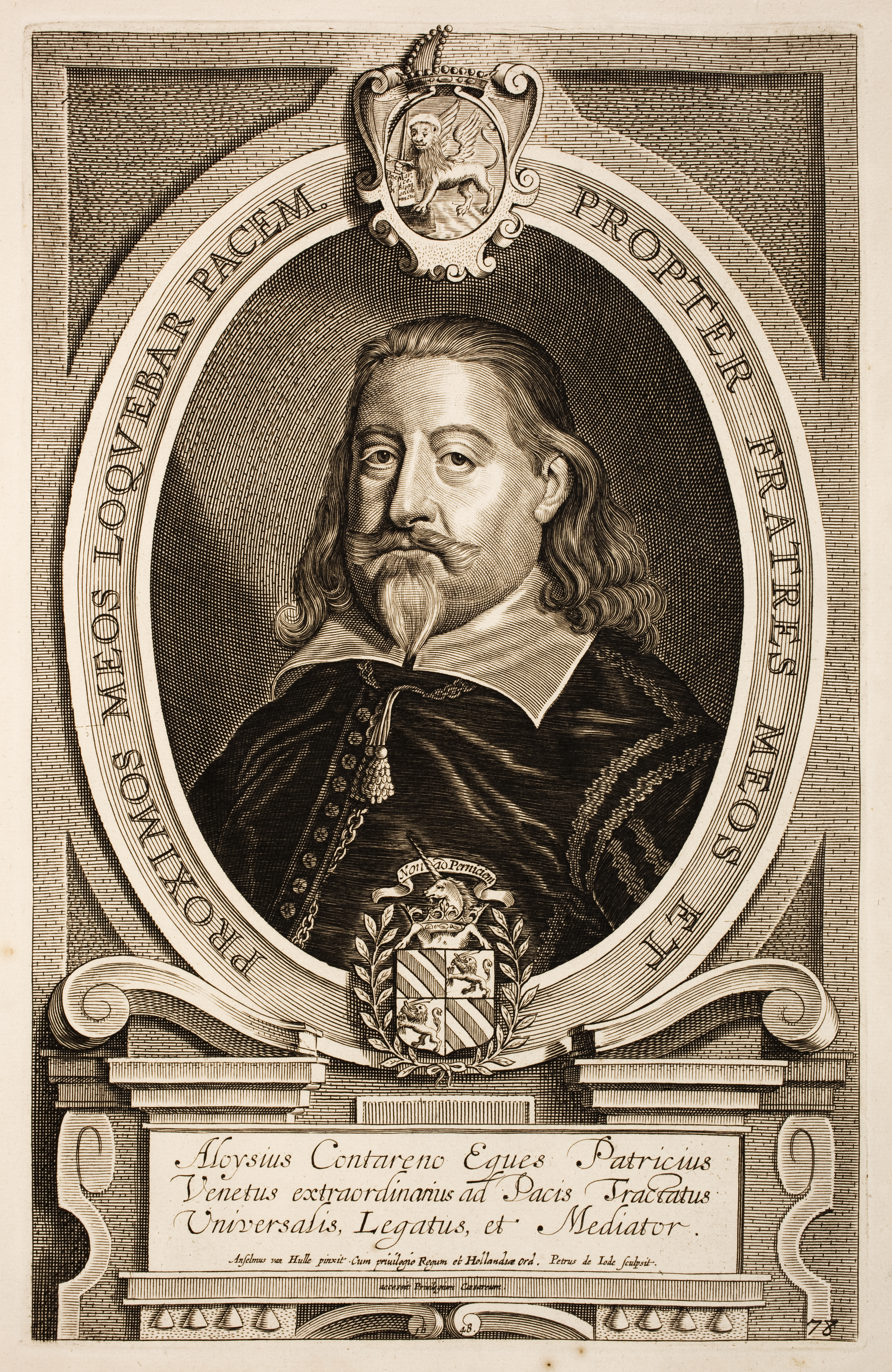
Engraving of Alvise Contarini

Alvise Contarini (April 23, 1597 — March 11, 1651) was a patrician and diplomat of the Republic of Venice.

== Biography ==
Born in Venice, Alvise Contarini entered the service of the Republic of Venice in 1618, and by 1623, he had risen to such prominence that he was elected to the Great Council of Venice.

His diplomatic career began with a posting as ambassador to the Dutch Republic. In 1626, he was named ambassador to England and in 1629 he moved on to become ambassador to France where he succeeded in persuading King Louis XIII to enter into an alliance with Venice in order to prevent troops of the Austrian Habsburgs from occupying the Valtellina. He also played a crucial role in persuading Cardinal Richelieu that France should back Sweden's intervention in the Thirty Years' War in 1630. In 1632, he was named ambassador to the papal court, before traveling to Constantinople where he was bailo from 1636 to 1641.

In 1641, Venice sent Contarini to the Congress of Münster. In this capacity, he spent the next seven years attempting to negotiate the end of the Thirty Years' War, a process that ultimately ended in the Peace of Westphalia. Contarini was particularly important in this process in that he was seen as a neutral party, who had the confidence of all parties. Since the chief papal negotiator, Cardinal Fabio Chigi, refused to meet with Protestant princes, whom he considered to be heretics, Contarini served as an intermediary between the cardinal and the Protestants during the negotiations.

He died in Venice in 1651.

== Legacy ==
The Contarini Institute for Mediation of the FernUniversität Hagen is named in Contarini's honour.
