= Pedro Martins (Brazilian footballer) =

Brazilian football executive

Pedro Martins Gomes da Silva
- Born: July 16, 1988 (age 38); Brazil
- Citizenship: Brazilian
- Education: MBA in the Football Industry, University of Liverpool
- Alma mater: UEFA Elite Scouting; Harvard Business School Online – Disruptive Strategy
- Occupation: Football executive
- Organization(s): Athletico Paranaense; Ferroviária; Federação Paulista de Futebol; Cruzeiro; Vasco da Gama; Botafogo; Santos FC
- Website: pgsmartins.com.br

Pedro Martins Gomes da Silva (born July 16, 1988) is a Brazilian football executive whose work spans several clubs, federation management, and roles in performance management, scouting and analysis, youth development, football operations, strategic management, and executive leadership.

== Early life and education ==
Pedro Martins was born in Brazil. He graduated in Business Administration and later completed an MBA in the Football Industry at the University of Liverpool, where he studied governance, strategic management, and the global economics of football.

== Career ==
=== Athletico Paranaense ===
Martins worked in performance, scouting, team analysis, and youth development at Athletico Paranaense from 2012 to 2017. His responsibilities included developing methodologies and operational processes for these departments, assessing player performance, and supporting the club’s recruitment strategy.

=== Ferroviária ===
In 2017, Martins joined Ferroviária de Araraquara as Director of Football. He implemented methods to integrate and modernize the men's, women's, and youth football departments. After leaving the club in 2018, Martins returned in 2020 as Director of Football. During his tenure, Ferroviária remained in the first division of the Campeonato Paulista, won the Copa Paulista, and secured a place in the Série D of the Campeonato Brasileiro the following year. Martins resigned from the club in January 2021.

=== Federação Paulista de Futebol ===
Martins served as Vice-President of the São Paulo Football Federation (FPF) in 2018 and 2019. After his brief stint at Ferroviária, he rejoined the federation in 2021, focusing on governance, competition regulation, and strategic alignment of activities within the state's football.

=== Cruzeiro ===
On December 30, 2021, Martins was appointed Director of Football at Cruzeiro following the club's acquisition by Ronaldo Nazário, to lead the sporting project of Cruzeiro's SAF (Sociedade Anônima Desportiva). He was responsible for the restructuring and growth of the football department, including the integration and modernization of the men's, women's, and youth departments. During his tenure, Cruzeiro won the Série B of the Brazilian Championship and gained access to Série A. Martins left the club in 2024.

=== Vasco da Gama ===
In 2024, Martins took on the role of football director at the Rio de Janeiro club. In 2024, Martins became Director of Football at Vasco da Gama during a transition period following changes in the club's ownership structure. He asked to leave the position after a short period, still in the same year.

=== Botafogo ===
Martins joined Botafogo in 2024 as Director of Football, overseeing the day-to-day management of the first team, focusing on relationships with players and coaching staff, and aligning goals with the club's management board. During his tenure, the club won the Série A of the Brazilian Championship and the Copa Libertadores. He asked to leave the position to take up a role at Santos FC.

=== Santos FC ===
Martins was appointed CEO of Santos Futebol Clube in 2025. His role was to focus on modernizing operational management and organizational restructuring after the club competed in the Série B of the Brazilian Championship. He asked to leave the position in May 2025.
