= Pedro Martins (bishop) =

Portuguese Bishop of Funai, 16th century

- Bishop of Funai
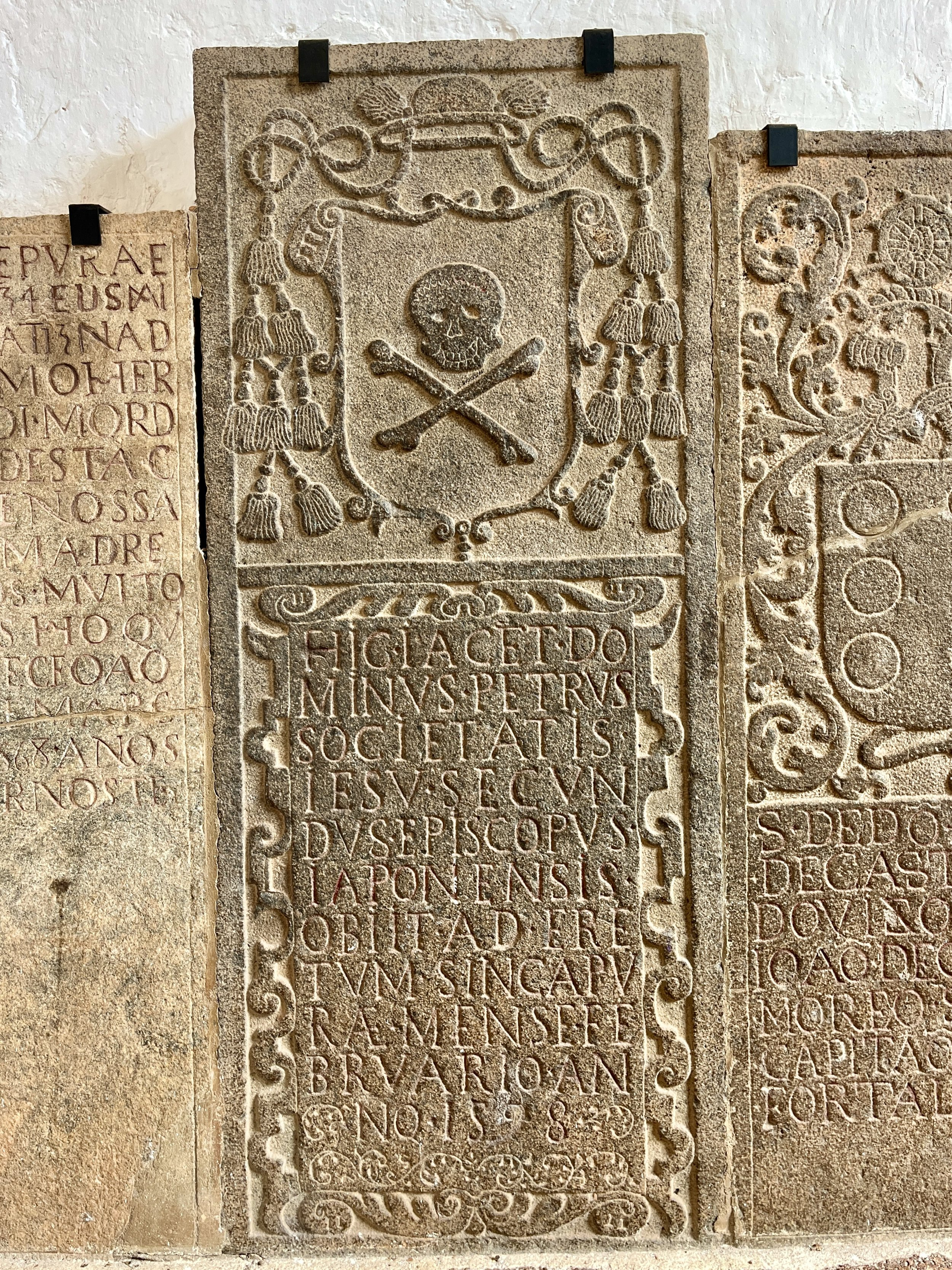
- Pedro Martins grave marker in St. Paul Church, Malaysia
- Diocese: Diocese of Funai
- Appointed: February 17, 1592
- In office: 1592–1598
- Predecessor: Sebastião de Morais
- Successor: Luis de Cerqueira
- Previous post: Provincial of the Society of Jesus in India

Orders
- Consecration: February 17, 1592 by Mateus de Medina, O. Carm.

Personal details
- Born: 1542 Coimbra, Portugal
- Died: February 1, 1598 (aged 55–56) Near Singapore
- Denomination: Catholic Church

Pedro Martins (Coimbra, 1542 – near Singapore, February 1, 1598) was a Portuguese Jesuit prelate of the Catholic Church, serving as the Bishop of Funai.

== Biography ==
He entered the Society of Jesus at the age of 14, on May 25, 1556. He earned a doctorate in theology from the University of Évora on July 16, 1573, later becoming a professor at the same university.

He was a preacher for King Sebastian I of Portugal, accompanying him to Morocco, where he was captured after the Battle of Alcácer Quibir. He was ransomed in 1579. Upon his return, he was appointed as the procurator of the Society of Jesus in Rome.

In 1585, he set sail for Goa, where he was appointed as Superior and Provincial of the Society of Jesus in India. He traveled with 11 missionaries, but on the way, their ship wrecked, and they were captured by the Cafres.

While in India, King Philip I of Portugal nominated him as Bishop of Funai, with his appointment confirmed by Pope Clement VIII on February 27, 1592. He was consecrated at the Cathedral of St. Catherine by Archbishop Mateus de Medina, O. Carm.

Between 1593 and 1595, due to the imprisonment of Bishop Leonardo Fernandes de Sá of Macau by the Sultanate of Aceh, he served as Apostolic Administrator of the Diocese.

He arrived in Nagasaki with six other missionaries from Macau on August 14, 1596, becoming the first resident bishop in Japan. On November 26 of that year, he had an audience with Toyotomi Hideyoshi in Fushimi. However, this did not prevent the martyrdom of 26 Christians on February 5, 1597.

== Death ==
In an effort to curb or reduce Christian persecution in Japan, he traveled to Goa to meet with the Viceroy, Dom Francisco da Gama, 4th Count of Vidigueira. However, during the journey, he died in the Singapore Strait on February 1, 1598. He was buried in St. Paul’s Church, Malacca.

== Bibliography ==
- Carvahlo, Eduardo Kol de (2003). Portugal e o Mundo: o Futuro do Passado – 4. Japão. CNC.
- Manuel Teles da Silva, 3rd Marquess of Alegrete (1722). Collection of Documents and Memories of the Royal Academy of Portuguese History. Vol. 2. Lisboa Ocidental: Officina de Pascoal da Sylva.
- Fortunato de Almeida (1917). History of the Church in Portugal. Vol. III Tomo 2. Coimbra: Imprensa Académica da Universidade de Coimbra. pp. 1021–1022.
- Antonio Francisco Cardim; Luciano Cordeiro (1894). Battles of the Society of Jesus in Its Glorious Province of Japan. Lisboa: Imprensa Nacional. p. 5.
