= 26 Martyrs of Japan =

Catholics executed in Japan in 1597; made into martyrs and saints

Saints 26 Martyrs of Japan
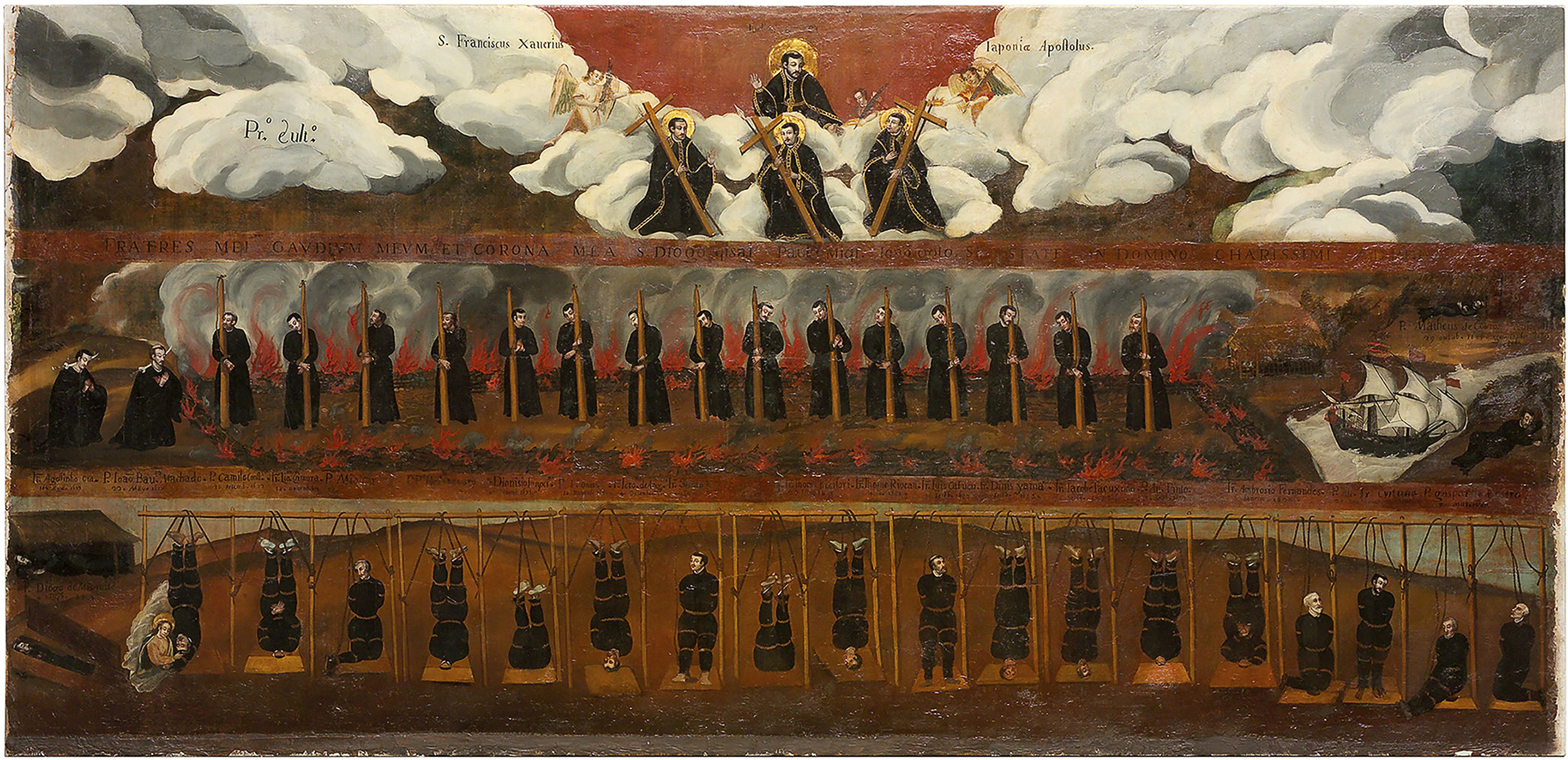
- Martyrdom of Paul Miki and Companions in Nagasaki

Martyrs
- Died: 5 February 1597; Nagasaki, Japan
- Venerated in: Catholic Church; Anglican Church; some Lutheran Churches
- Beatified: 14 September 1627, Vatican City by Pope Urban VIII
- Canonized: 8 June 1862 by Pope Pius IX
- Feast: 6 February
- Attributes: Martyr's palm Cross
- Patronage: Japan, persecuted Christians

The 26 Martyrs of Japan (Japanese: 日本二十六聖人, Hepburn: Nihon Nijūroku Seijin) were a group of Catholics who were executed by crucifixion on 5 February 1597, in Nagasaki, Japan. Their martyrdom is especially significant in the history of the Catholic Church in Japan.

A promising beginning to Catholic missions in Japan – with perhaps as many as 300,000 Catholics by the end of the 16th century – met complications from competition between the missionary groups, political difficulty between Portugal and Spain and factions within the government of Japan. Christianity was suppressed and it was during this time that the twenty-six martyrs were executed. By 1630, Catholicism had been driven underground. When Christian missionaries returned to Japan 250 years later, they found a community of "hidden Catholics" that had survived underground.

== Early Christianity in Japan ==
On 15 August 1549, the Jesuit fathers Francis Xavier (later canonized by Gregory XV in 1622), Cosme de Torres, and Juan Fernández arrived in Kagoshima, Japan, from Portugal with hopes of bringing Catholicism to Japan. On 29 September, St. Francis Xavier visited Shimazu Takahisa, the daimyō of Kagoshima, asking for permission to build the first Catholic mission in Japan. The daimyō agreed in hopes of creating a trade relationship with Europe.

The shogunate and the imperial government at first supported the Catholic mission and the missionaries, thinking that they would reduce the power of the Buddhist monks and help trade with Spain and Portugal. By the late 1500s, the government had begun to grow wary of foreign influence; the shogunate was also concerned about colonialism. In 1587, Toyotomi Hideyoshi ordered all Christians expelled from Japan on the grounds that foreigners threatened the Japanese state and that Christianity was hostile to Buddhism.

== Martyrdom ==
In the aftermath of the San Felipe incident of 1596, twenty-six Catholics – four Spaniards, one Mexican, and one Portuguese from India (all of whom were Franciscan missionaries), three Japanese Jesuits, and seventeen Japanese members of the Third Order of St. Francis, including three young boys who served as altar boys for the missionary priests – were arrested, on the orders of Hideyoshi, in January 1597 in modern day Kyoto. Prior to their executions by crucifixion, they were tied together with rope, paraded through towns behind carts, following a sign that declared their sentencing and proclaimed the men were criminals for the crime of "defying the regent's prohibition against preaching the Christian faith". Along this parade, they were tortured with their left ears cut off, and subject to verbal and physical abuse from crowds, who would stone them and stuff weeds in their mouths. On 5 February 1597, they were crucified, impaled with lances, and martyred on a hill that overlooks Nagasaki city.

After the persecution of 1597, there were about seventy sporadic instances of martyrdom until 1614. Fifty-five Catholics were martyred in Nagasaki on 10 September 1622, in what became known as the Great Genna Martyrdom. At this time Catholicism was officially outlawed. The Church remained without clergy and theological teaching disintegrated until the arrival of Western missionaries in the 19th century.

== Recognition ==
While there were many more martyrs, the first twenty-six missionary and convert martyrs came to be especially revered, the most celebrated of whom was Paul Miki. The Martyrs of Japan were canonized by the Catholic Church on 8 June 1862, by Pope Pius IX, and are listed on the calendar as Sts. Paul Miki and his Companions, commemorated on 6 February, since 5 February, the date of their death, is the feast of St. Agatha. They were included in the General Roman Calendar for the first time in 1969. Previously they were honoured locally, but no special Mass for them was included even in the Missae pro aliquibus locis (Masses for some places) section of the 1962 Roman Missal. Some 21st-century publications based on it do have such a Mass under 13 February.

The Church of England also celebrates the Japanese martyrs liturgically with a commemoration on 6 February. The Anglican Church in Japan (Nippon Sei Ko Kai), a member of the Anglican Communion, added them to its calendar in 1959 as an annual 5 February commemoration of all the martyrs of Japan and the Episcopal Church followed suit. The Evangelical Lutheran Church in America added a commemoration on 5 February to their calendar.

The Church of the Holy Japanese Martyrs (Civitavecchia, Italy) is a Catholic church dedicated to the 26 Martyrs of Nagasaki. It is decorated with artwork by Japanese artist Luke Hasegawa.

== List of martyrs ==
These first twenty-six Martyrs of Japan, also known as Pedro Bautista Blasquez y Blasquez and twenty-two companions, along with Paulus Miki and two companions, were beatified on 14 September 1627 by Pope Urban VIII, and canonized on 8 June 1862 by Pope Pius IX.

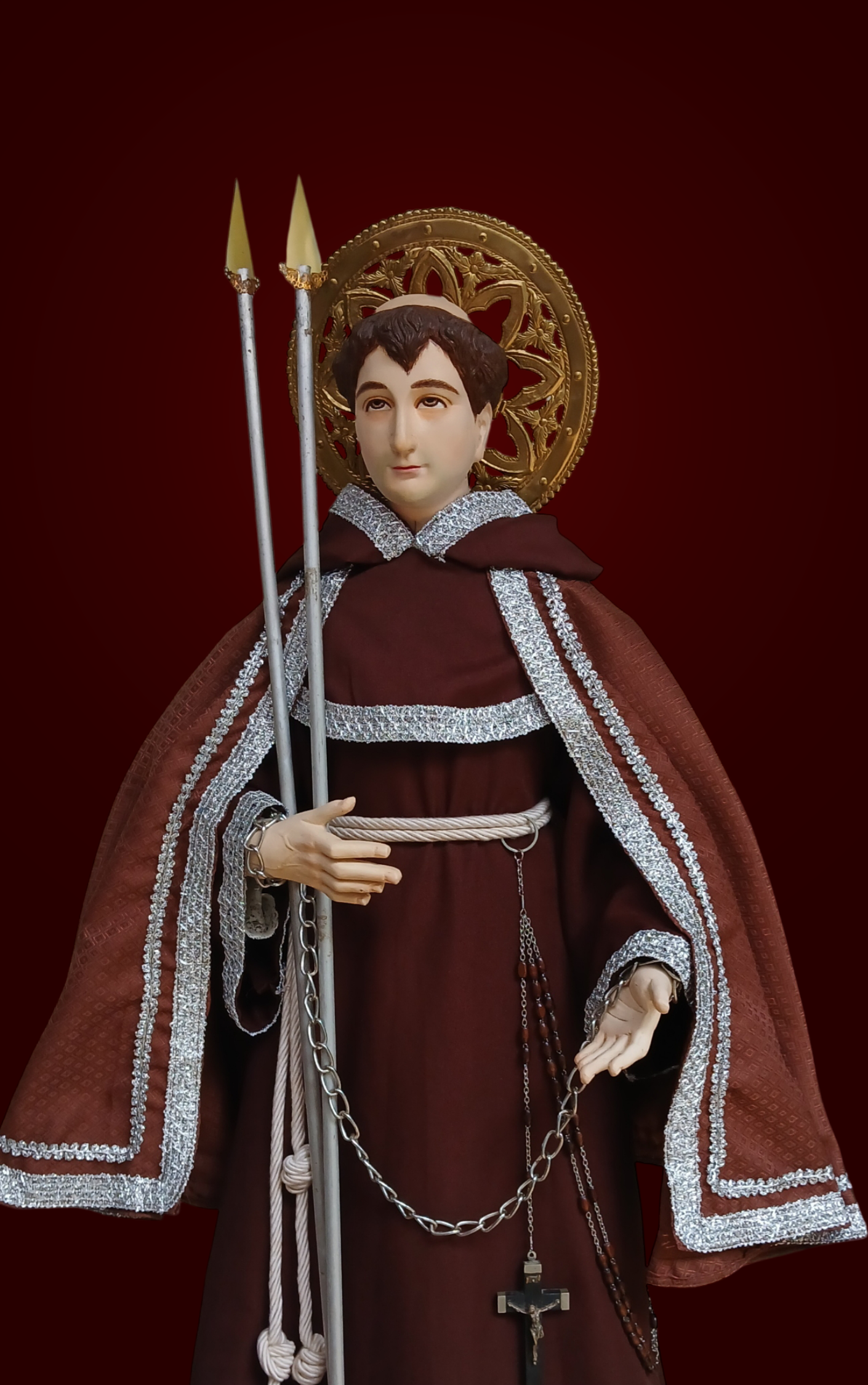
Saint Pedro Bautista

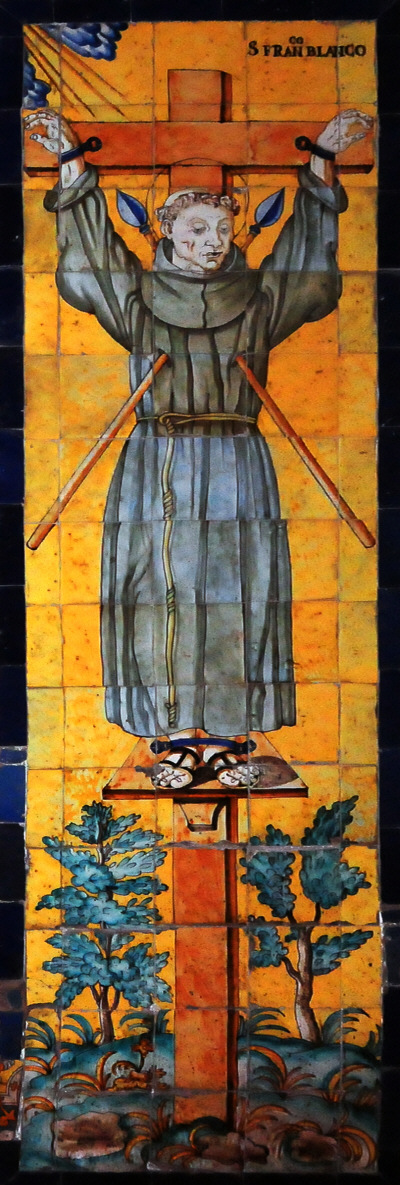
St. Francisco Blanco

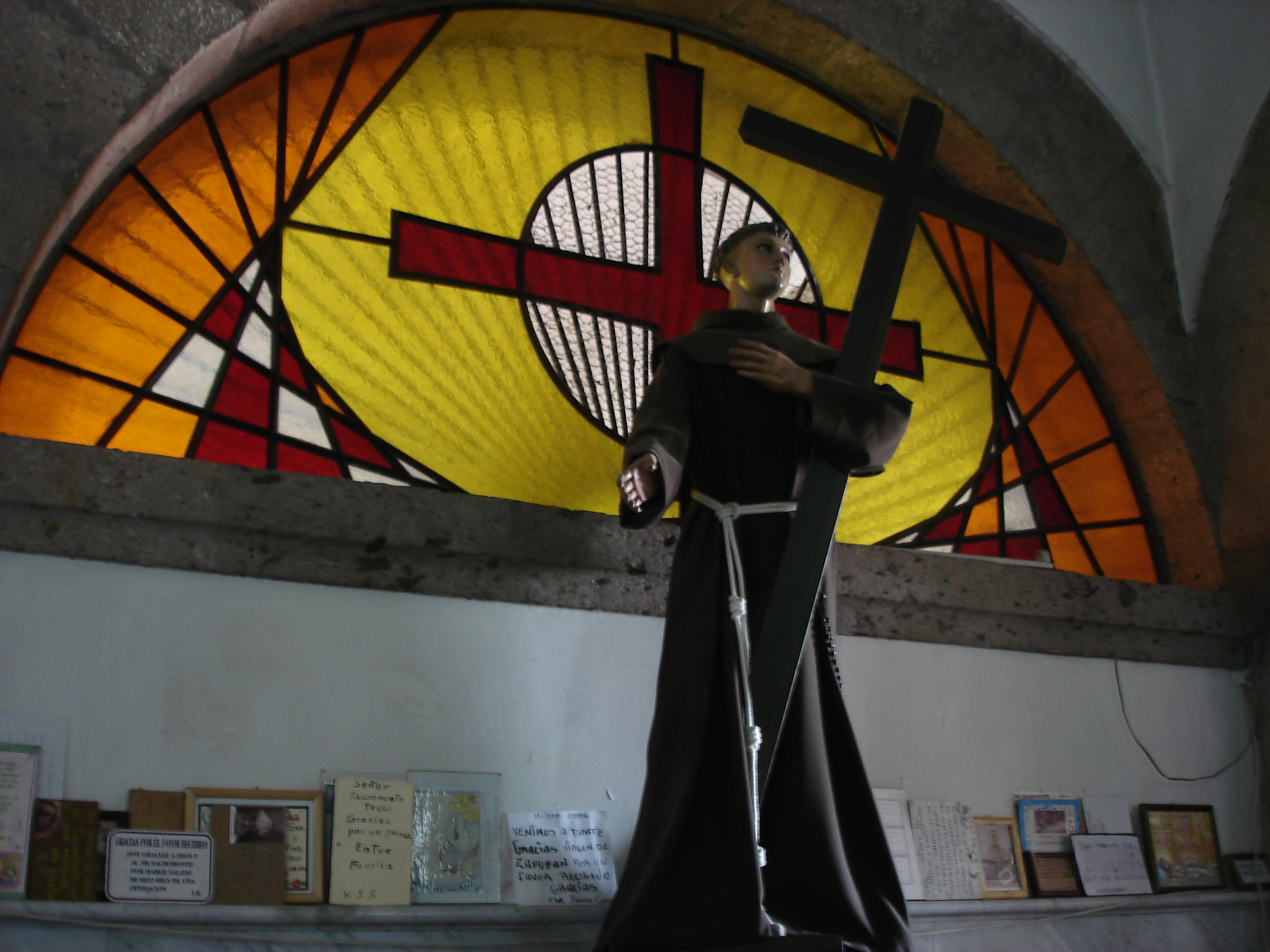
Statue of Philip of Jesus in the Basilica of Our Lady of Zapopan, Mexico

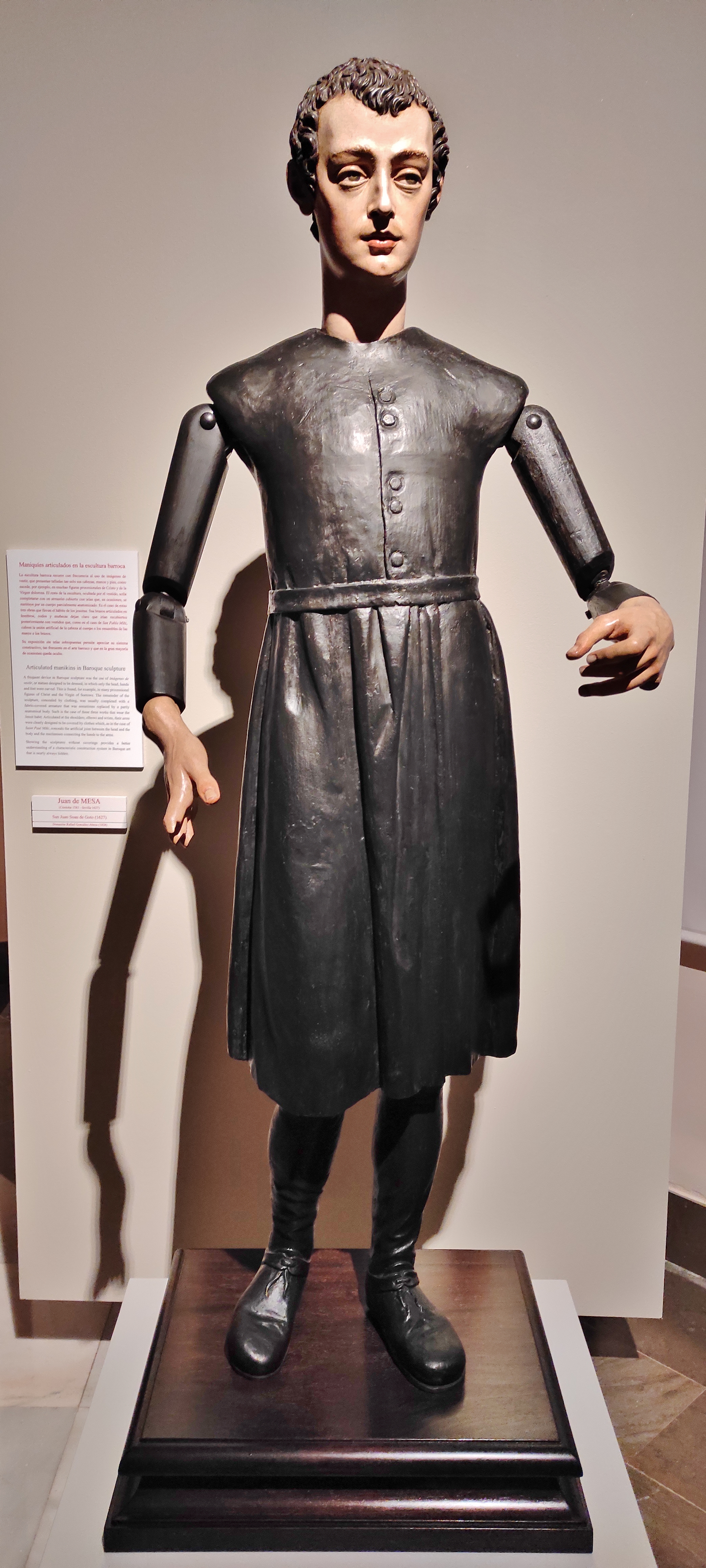
Saint John Soan de Gotó by Juan de Mesa in Museum of Fine Arts of Seville

=== Foreign Franciscan missionaries – Alcantarines ===
- Martin of the Ascension
- Pedro Bautista
- Philip of Jesus
- Francisco Blanco
- Francisco of Saint Michael
- Gundisalvus (Gonsalvo) Garcia

==== Japanese Franciscan tertiaries ====
- Anthony Dainan
- Bonaventure of Miyako
- Cosmas Takeya
- Francisco of Nagasaki
- Francis Kichi
- Gabriel de Duisco
- Joachim Sakakibara
- John Kisaka
- Leo Karasumaru
- Louis Ibaraki
- Matthias of Miyako
- Michael Kozaki
- Paul Ibaraki
- Paul Suzuki
- Peter Sukejirō
- Thomas Kozaki
- Thomas Xico aka Thomas Danki

=== Japanese Jesuits ===
- James Kisai
- John Soan de Goto
- Paul Miki

== See also ==
- Basilica Minore de Santuario de San Pedro Bautista
- Basilica of the Twenty-Six Holy Martyrs of Japan (Nagasaki)
- Lorenzo Ruiz
- Martyrs of Japan
- Nanban trade
- Silence (2016 film)
- Twenty-Six Martyrs Museum and Monument
