= Paul Miki =

Japanese Catholic martyr

Saint Paul Miki SJ
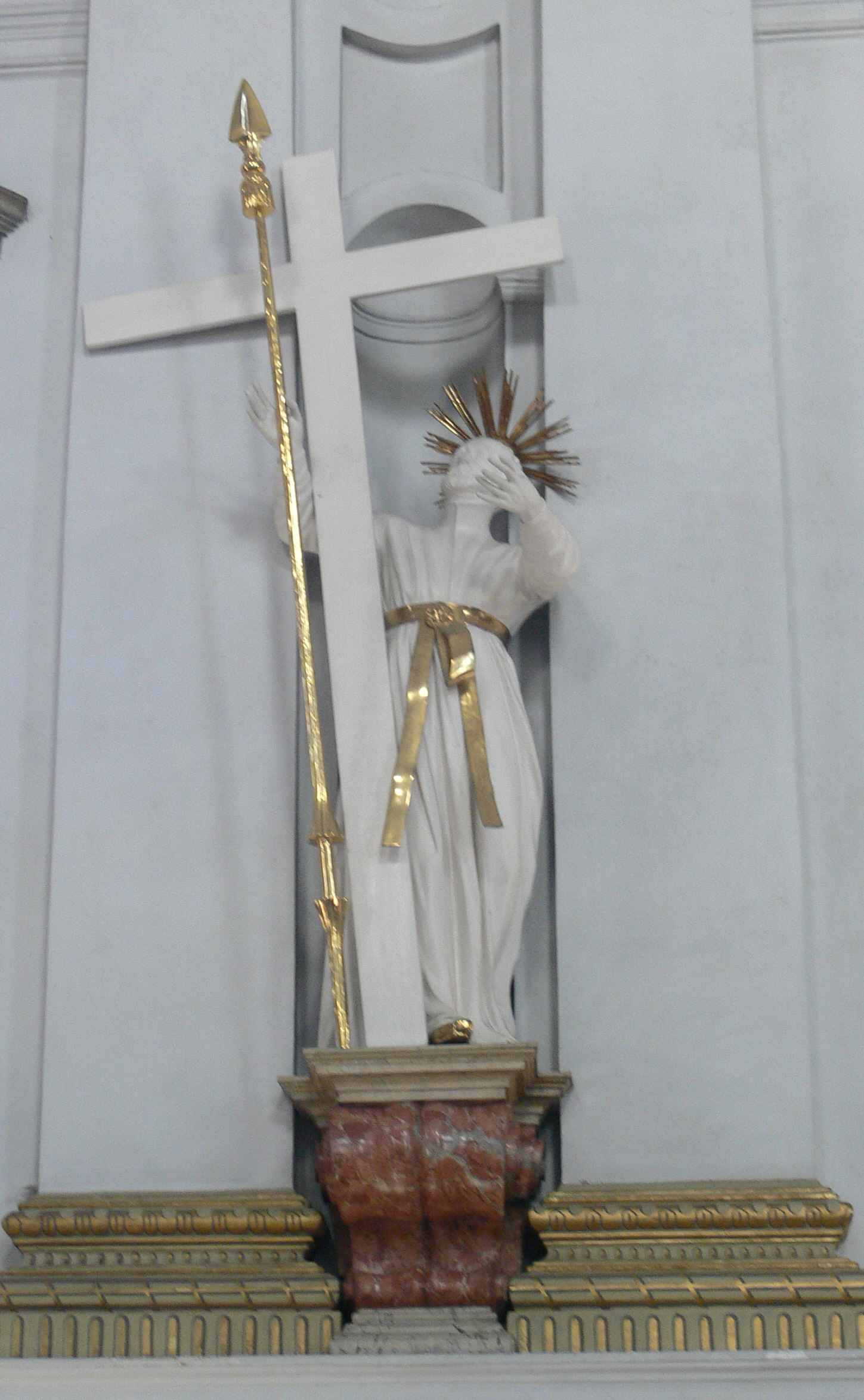
- Statue of Miki, bearing stylised depictions of the instruments of his death, in St Martin's Church in Bamberg, Germany.

Jesuit and Martyr
- Born: c. 1562
- Died: 5 February 1597; Nagasaki, Japan
- Venerated in: Catholic Church; Lutheranism; Anglicanism
- Beatified: 14 September 1627 by Pope Urban VIII
- Canonized: 8 June 1862 by Pope Pius IX
- Feast: 6 February
- Attributes: Martyr’s Palm, cross, spear
- Patronage: Japan

Paul Miki, SJ (Japanese: パウロ三木, romanized: Paulo Miki; c. 1562 – 5 February 1597) was a Japanese Catholic evangelist and Jesuit, known for his martyrdom during a 16th-century anti-Catholic uprising

Canonized by Pope Pius IX in 1862, Miki is recognized as one of the Twenty-six Martyrs of Japan.

== Biography ==
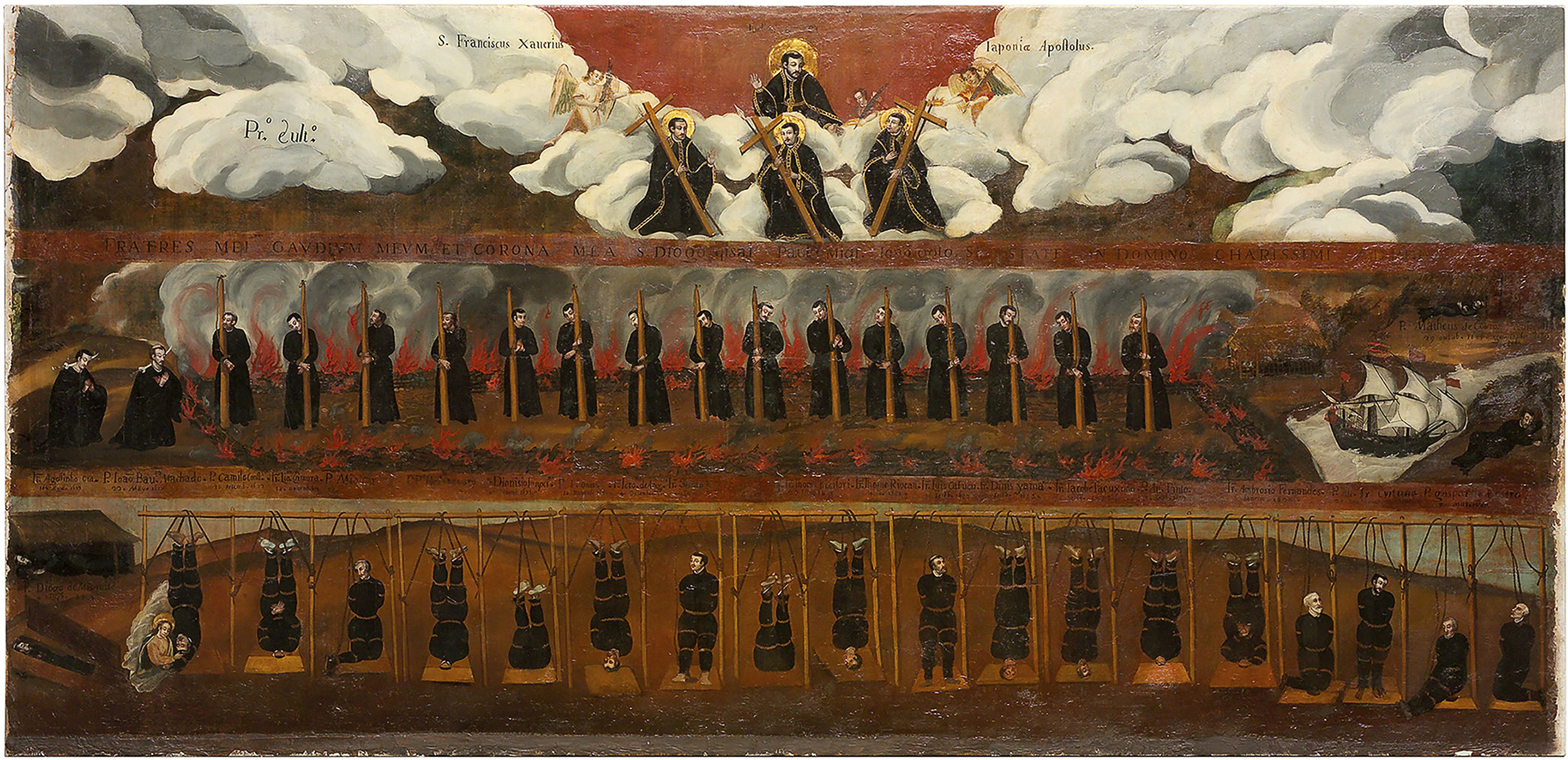
Martyrdom of Paul Miki and Companions in Nagasaki

Paul Miki was born into a wealthy Japanese family. He was educated by the Jesuits in Azuchi and Takatsuki. He joined the Society of Jesus and became a well known and successful preacher – gaining numerous converts to Catholicism. The ruler of Japan, Toyotomi Hideyoshi, began persecuting Catholics for fear of the Jesuits' influence and intentions, and possibly that of European visitors.

Miki was arrested and jailed with his fellow Catholics, who were later forced to march 966 kilometers (600 miles) from Kyoto to Nagasaki; all the while singing the Te Deum. On arriving in Nagasaki – which today has the largest Catholic population in Japan – Miki had his chest pierced with a lance while tied to a cross on 5 February 1597.

He preached his last sermon from the cross, and it is maintained that he forgave his executioners. Crucified alongside him were Joan Soan (de Gotó) and Santiago Kisai, also of the Society of Jesus; along with twenty-three other clergy and laity, all of whom were canonized by Pope Pius IX in 1862.

== See also ==
- Twenty-six Martyrs of Japan
- 205 Martyrs of Japan
