= 1591 =

1591 in various calendars
- Gregorian calendar: 1591; MDXCI
- Ab urbe condita: 2344
- Armenian calendar: 1040; ԹՎ ՌԽ
- Assyrian calendar: 6341
- Balinese saka calendar: 1512–1513
- Bengali calendar: 997–998
- Berber calendar: 2541
- English Regnal year: 33 Eliz. 1 – 34 Eliz. 1
- Buddhist calendar: 2135
- Burmese calendar: 953
- Byzantine calendar: 7099–7100
- Chinese calendar: 庚寅年 (Metal Tiger); 4288 or 4081 — to — 辛卯年 (Metal Rabbit); 4289 or 4082
- Coptic calendar: 1307–1308
- Discordian calendar: 2757
- Ethiopian calendar: 1583–1584
- Hebrew calendar: 5351–5352
- Hindu calendars
- Vikram Samvat: 1647–1648
- Shaka Samvat: 1512–1513
- Kali Yuga: 4691–4692
- Holocene calendar: 11591
- Igbo calendar: 591–592
- Iranian calendar: 969–970
- Islamic calendar: 999–1000
- Japanese calendar: Tenshō 19 (天正１９年)
- Javanese calendar: 1511–1512
- Julian calendar: Gregorian minus 10 days
- Korean calendar: 3924
- Minguo calendar: 321 before ROC 民前321年
- Nanakshahi calendar: 123
- Thai solar calendar: 2133–2134
- Tibetan calendar: ལྕགས་ཕོ་སྟག་ལོ་ (male Iron-Tiger); 1717 or 1336 or 564 — to — ལྕགས་མོ་ཡོས་ལོ་ (female Iron-Hare); 1718 or 1337 or 565

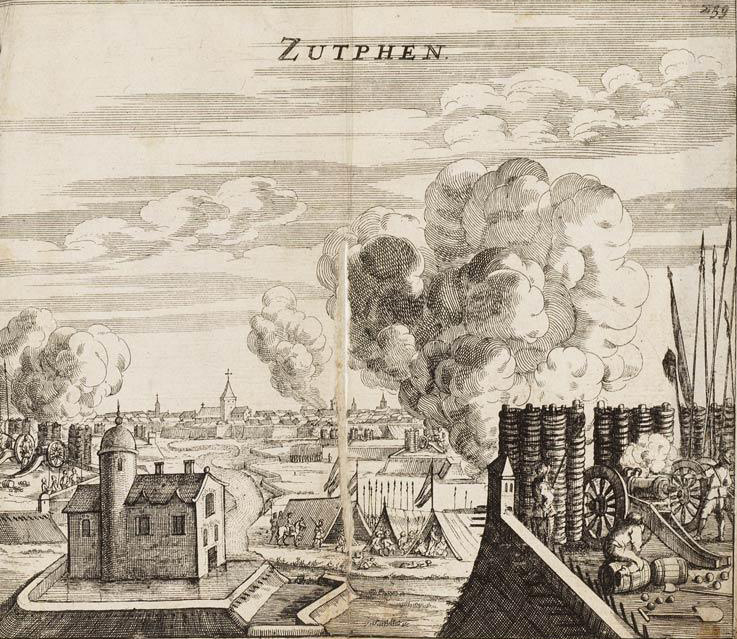
May 19–May 30: Capture of Zutphen

1591 (MDXCI) was a common year starting on Tuesday of the Gregorian calendar and a common year starting on Friday of the Julian calendar, the 1591st year of the Common Era (CE) and Anno Domini (AD) designations, the 591st year of the 2nd millennium, the 91st year of the 16th century, and the 2nd year of the 1590s decade. As of the start of 1591, the Gregorian calendar was 10 days ahead of the Julian calendar, which remained in localized use until 1923.

== Events ==
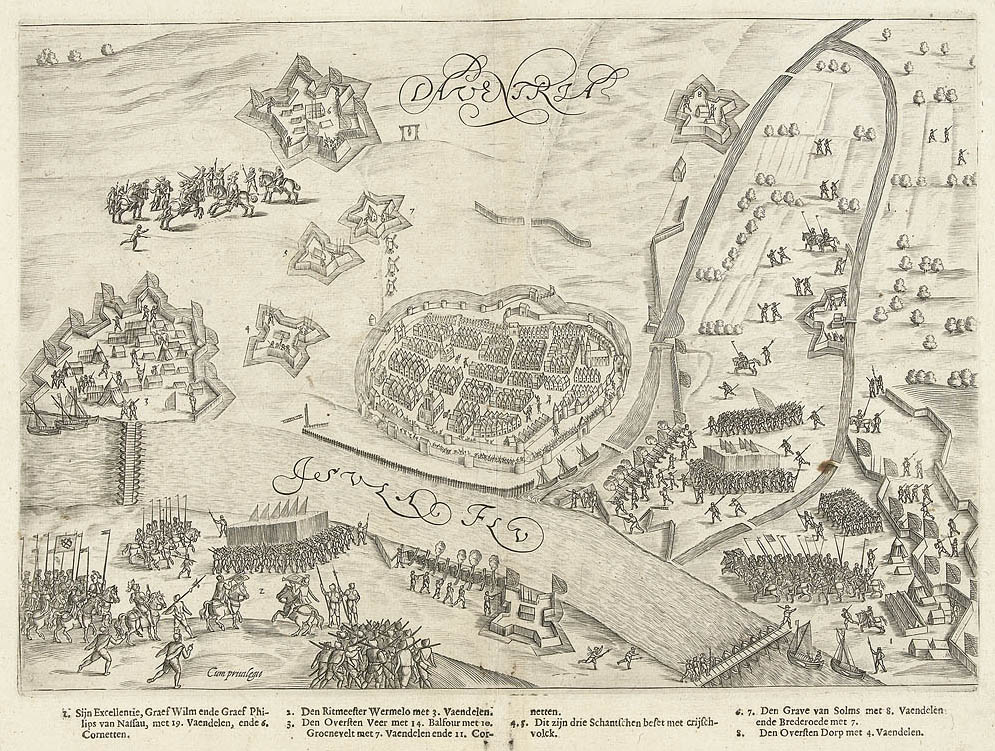
June 1–June 10: Siege of Deventer

=== January–March ===
- January 27 – Scottish schoolmaster John Fian becomes the first person to be executed after the North Berwick witch trials, following his conviction for the crime of witchcraft. Fian is taken to the Castlehill outside of Edinburgh and strangled after which his body is burned. Agnes Sampson is garroted the next day at Castlehill and then burned.
- February 7 – Pope Gregory XIV, who had succeeded Pope Urban VII in December, appoints Cardinal Marco Antonio Colonna and six other cardinals to a commission to revise the Sixtine Vulgate Latin translation of the Bible, published in 1590 under the editorship of Pope Sixtus V, to which the College of Cardinals has taken exception. The revision of the revision, dubbed the Sixto-Clementine Vulgate, will be completed in 1592 and be the official version used by the Catholic Church until 1979.
- February 25 – Poet Edmund Spenser is granted an annual pension of 50 pounds sterling by Queen Elizabeth I of England in recognition of his publication of The Faerie Queen. The pension is paid in quarterly installments of £12 10s. on March 25, June 24, September 29 and December 25.
- March 1 – Pope Gregory XIV excommunicates King Henry IV of France and orders the clergy, nobles, judicial functionaries and the Third Estate of France to renounce the nation's king.
- March 13 – Battle of Tondibi: In Mali, forces sent by the Saadi dynasty ruler of Morocco, Ahmad al-Mansur, and led by Judar Pasha, defeat the Songhai Empire, despite being outnumbered by at least five to one.
- March 21 – Pope Gregory XIV issues the papal bull Cogit nos, prohibiting the placing of bets on the outcome of papal elections, the length of time that a pope will reign, or who will be appointed as a cardinal.

=== April–June ===
- April 10
  - The emancipation of Filipino slaves in the Spanish Philippines along with reparations to former slaves, with the threat of excommunication of any Spanish slaveholder who refuses to comply, is ordered by Pope Gregory XIV in the papal bull Cum Sicuti.
  - English merchant James Lancaster sets off on a voyage to the East Indies.
- April 21 – Japanese tea-master Sen no Rikyū commits seppuku, on the order of Toyotomi Hideyoshi.
- May 15 – In Russia, Tsarevich Dimitri, son of Ivan the Terrible, is found dead in mysterious circumstances, at the palace in Uglich. The official explanation is that he has cut his own throat during an epileptic seizure. Many believe he has been murdered by his rival, Boris Godunov, who becomes tsar.
- May 24 – Sir John Norreys, with an expeditionary force sent by Queen Elizabeth I of England, takes the town of Guingamp in Brittany after a brief siege, on behalf of Henry of Navarre.
- May 30
  - Timbuktu is captured by an expedition of Arma people sent by the Saadi ruler of Morocco and led by Judar Pasha.
  - Zutphen is captured by the Dutch and English, under Maurice of Nassau.
- June 10 – Deventer is captured by the Dutch, under Maurice of Nassau.
- June 26 – The siege of the Spanish Netherlands city of Delfzijl is started by Maurice, Prince of Orange, stadtholder of the Dutch Republic, who leads a Dutch and English Army against the Spanish defenders. Delfzijl falls after six days, and is surrendered on July 2.

=== July–September ===
- July 13 – A Crimean army, led by the Tatar Khan Ğazı II Giray, begins a siege of Moscow.
- July 15 – The Battle of the Berlengas takes place off of the coast of Portugal as the Earl of Cumberland's five English privateers are surprised by five Spanish galleys commanded by General Francisco Coloma, commander of the Armada de Guarda Costa. Cumberland's ship, the Golden Noble, is captured.
- July 18 (6 Shawal 999 AH) – In India, the four-day Battle of Bhuchar Mori ends in the Gujarat state, as General Mirza Aziz Koka leads the Mughal Empire gains a decisive victory over Nawanagar, led by the Sultan Muzaffar Shah III.
- July 22 – The Durtnell (Dartnell) family of Brasted, Kent, England, begin to work as building contractors. The business continues under thirteen generations of the family until ceasing to trade in 2019.
- July 25 – Siege of Knodsenburg: Dutch Republic stadtholder Maurice of Nassau and English General Francis Vere defeat the Duke of Parma outside Nijmegen after a four-day siege.
- August 1 – Serdar Ferhad Pasha is appointed the new Grand Vizier of the Ottoman Empire by Sultan Murad III, replacing Koca Sinan Pasha following a revolt of the Janissaries.
- August 9 – The Khan of the Crimean Tatara, Ğazı II Giray, is wounded by the defenders against his siege of Moscow. Gazi's brother, Fetih I Giray, continues the siege, which is finally settled with a peace agreement and payment of 10,000 rubles in 1594.
- August 29 – Peter the Lame, ruler of the Principality of Moldavia (part of modern-day Romania and of Moldova) abdicates in Iași after having reigned for most of the previous 17 years. Peter's downfall comes after he is unable to raise the money paid as tribute to the Ottoman Empire. He is replaced by Aaron the Tyrant (Aron Vodă).
- August 30 – The Battle of Flores begins off Flores Island (Azores). By September 1, the Spanish fleet is victorious over the English and captures the English ship Revenge, fatally wounding Richard Grenville.
- September 4 – The Kunohe rebellion, which was started by Kunohe Masazane on March 13 on northern Honshu island in Japan's Mutsu Province (in the modern-day Iwate Prefecture), is suppressed by the samurai Toyotomi Hideyoshi, Chancellor of the Realm. The victory completes the unification of Japan.
- September 5 – A storm near the Azores in the North Atlantic begins, sinking a large number of the Spanish ships, including the recently-captured HMS Revenge. During August and September, at least eight intense hurricanes occur in the most severe of the pre-1600 seasons on record.
- September 14 – Siege of Hulst: Hulst is captured by Maurice of Orange, the staatholder of the Dutch Republic.

=== October–December ===
- October 8 – The Separation Edict, a law imposing an immobile social class structure in Japan, is promulgated by Toyotomi Hideyoshi.
- October 16 – Pope Gregory XIV dies from an attack of gallstones and leaves the Papacy of the Roman Catholic Church vacant for the third time in 14 months. The Pope, formerly Cardinal Niccolò Sfondrati, had served for only 10 months after being elected on December 5, 1590.
- October 19 – The Islamic calendar year 1000 A.H. begins with the first day of the month of Muharram, with concerns that the new year will herald the end of the world. When the year ends on October 7, 1592, without an apocalypse, the official interpretation among Ottoman Muslims is that the Ottoman Empire "had come closer to perfection than any other Muslim state.
- October 21 – The city of Nijmegen is captured from Spanish occupiers by Maurice of Orange, the staatholder of the Dutch Republic.
- October 26 – The Portuguese invasion of the Jaffna Kingdom begins on the north side of the island of Sri Lanka.
- October 29 – Giovanni Antonio Facchinetti is elected on the third ballot to succeed the late Pope Gregory XIV, after Cardinal Ludovico Madruzzo withdraws his candidacy. and takes the name Pope Innocent IX.
- November 4 – The coronation of Pope Innocent IX takes place in Rome as Cardinal Andreas von Österreich places the crown on the head of Giovanni Facchinetti.
- November 6 – Hundred Years' Croatian–Ottoman War: The Ottoman Empire successfully captures the Croatian rebel fort of Ripač.
- November 11 – King Henry IV of France begins the siege of Rouen, the Spanish-held capital of Normandy. The Spanish Navy arrives after five months and King Henry abandons the siege on April 20.
- November 19 – Queen Elizabeth I grants a royal charter founding Queen Elizabeth Grammar School, Wakefield, a boys' school; the institution, now known as Queen Elizabeth's School, later develops into an independent day school.
- November 27 – In Italy, Giovanni Giustiniani Campi is elected as the new Doge of the Republic of Genoa after a 12-day search for a successor to Battista Negrone.
- December 10 – Four Roman Catholic priests and three laymen are executed in England in a campaign against the Roman Catholic Church.
- December 18 – Pope Innocent IX begins a tour of the seven pilgrimage churches around Rome, despite being unwell, and his illness worsens. He dies 12 days later.
- December 27 – Francis Stewart, Earl of Bothwell leads the attack on the Holyrood Palace in Edinburgh. Having been alerted by a premature attack on the palace's prison, King James VI of Scotland and Queen Anne are able to take refuge within the castle, and the raid fails. Seven of Bothwell's men are subsequently captured and hanged.
- December 30 – Pope Innocent IX dies only two months after having been elected as the Pontiff of the Roman Catholic Church, leaving the Papacy vacant for the 4th time in 16 months.

=== Date unknown ===
- The city of Hyderabad, India, is founded by Muhammad Quli Qutb Shah.
- The Rialto Bridge in Venice, designed by Antonio da Ponte, is completed.
- The first of the Conimbricenses commentaries on Aristotle, by the Jesuits of the University of Coimbra, is published.
- The Siamese-Cambodian War begins.
- The defeated Askia dynasty move to the Dendi province in modern-day Niger.

== Births ==
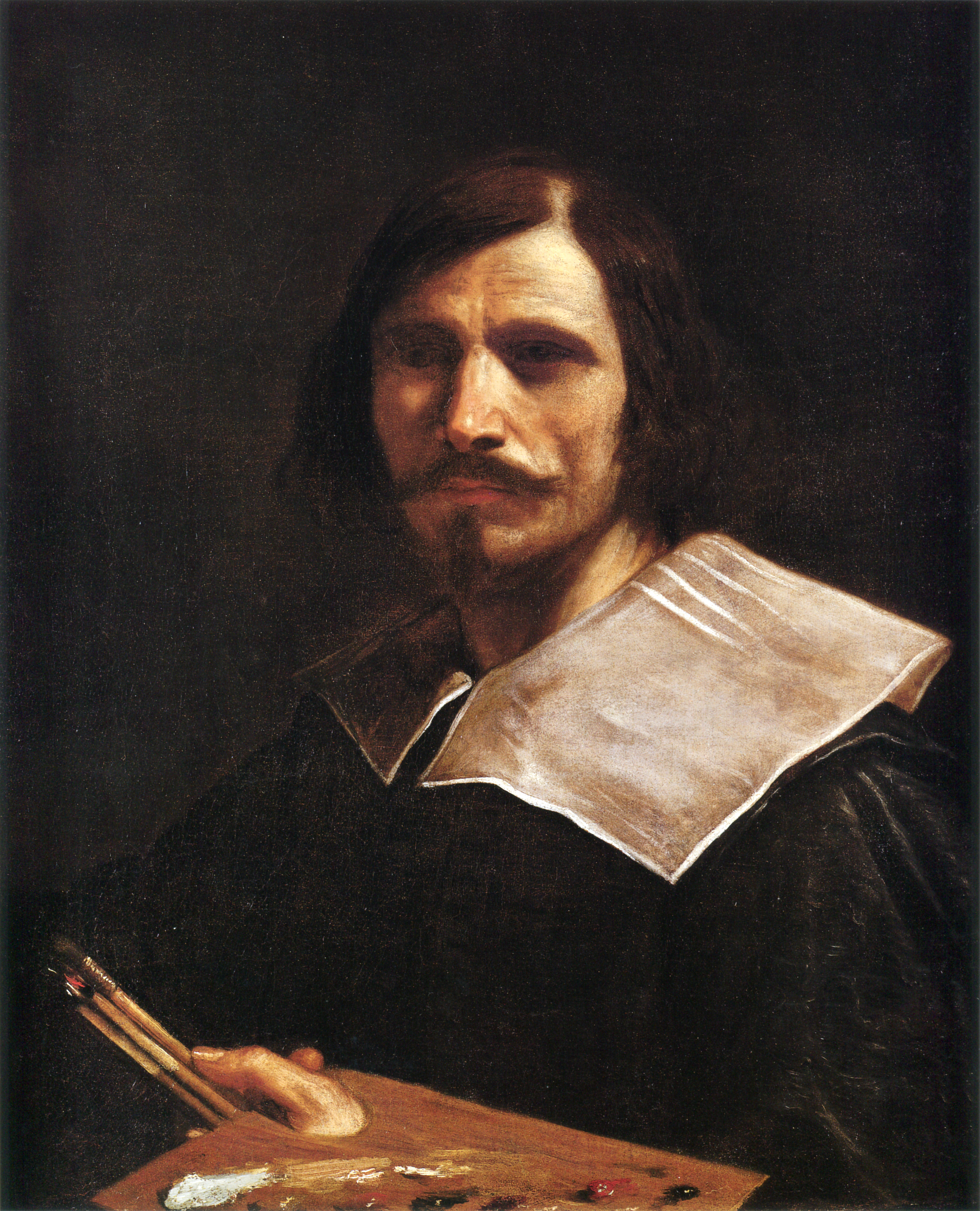
Guercino

=== January–June ===
- January 3 – Valentin de Boulogne, French painter (d. 1632)
- January 4 – William Spencer, 2nd Baron Spencer of Wormleighton, British baron (d. 1636)
- January 7 – Princess Dorothea, Abbess of Quedlinburg (d. 1617)
- January 11 – Robert Devereux, 3rd Earl of Essex, English Civil War general (d. 1646)
- January 12 – Jusepe de Ribera, Spanish Tenebrist painter and printmaker (d. 1652)
- January 15 – David van Goorle, Dutch theologian and theoretical scientist (d. 1612)
- January 26 – Matthew Boynton, English politician (d. 1647)
- January 29 – Franciscus Junius, pioneer of Germanic philology (d. 1677)
- February 8
  - Hervey Bagot, English politician (d. 1660)
  - Guercino, Italian painter (d. 1666)
- February 13 – Antonio Sabino, Italian composer (d. 1650)
- February 21 (or March 2) – Girard Desargues, French mathematician (d. 1661)
- February 25 – Friedrich von Spee, German Jesuit and poet (d. 1635)
- February 28 – Henry Clifford, 5th Earl of Cumberland, English politician (d. 1643)
- March 2 – Willem Boreel, Dutch diplomat (d. 1668)
- March 3 – Lucas de Wael, Flemish painter (d. 1661)
- March 6 – Tommaso Tamburini, Italian theologian (d. 1675)
- March 9 – Johannes Chrysostomus vander Sterre, Dutch abbot, ecclesiastical writer (d. 1652)
- March 11 – Isabella of Savoy, Italian noble (d. 1626)
- March 15 or 1593 – Alexandre de Rhodes, French Jesuit missionary (d. 1660)
- March 19 – Dirck Hals, Dutch painter (d. 1656)
- March 28 – William Cecil, 2nd Earl of Salisbury, English earl (d. 1668)
- April 5 – Prince Frederick Ulrich, Duke of Brunswick-Lüneburg (d. 1634)
- April 11 – Bartholomeus Strobel, Silezian painter (d. 1650)
- April 25 – Marcos de Torres y Rueda, interim viceroy of New Spain (d. 1649)
- May 2 – Prince Francis Charles of Saxe-Lauenburg (d. 1660)
- May 5 – Frederick Achilles, Duke of Württemberg-Neuenstadt (d. 1631)
- May 26 – Olimpia Maidalchini, Italian noblewoman (d. 1657)
- June 16 – Joseph Solomon Delmedigo, Italian physician, mathematician, and music theorist (d. 1655)
- June 24 – Mustafa I, sultan of the Ottoman Empire (d. 1639)

=== July–December ===
- July 4 – Jonathan Rashleigh, English politician (d. 1675)
- July 9 – Jean Bagot, French theologian (d. 1664)
- July 20 – Anne Hutchinson, English Puritan preacher (d. 1643)
- August 6 – George William, Count Palatine of Zweibrücken-Birkenfeld (d. 1669)
- August 12 – Louise de Marillac, French co-founder of the Daughters of Charity (d. 1660)
- August 24 – Robert Herrick, English poet (d. 1674)
- August 28 – John Christian of Brieg, Duke of Brzeg (1602–1639) (d. 1639)
- September 8 – Marie Angélique Arnauld, French abbess of the Abbey of Port-Royal (d. 1661)

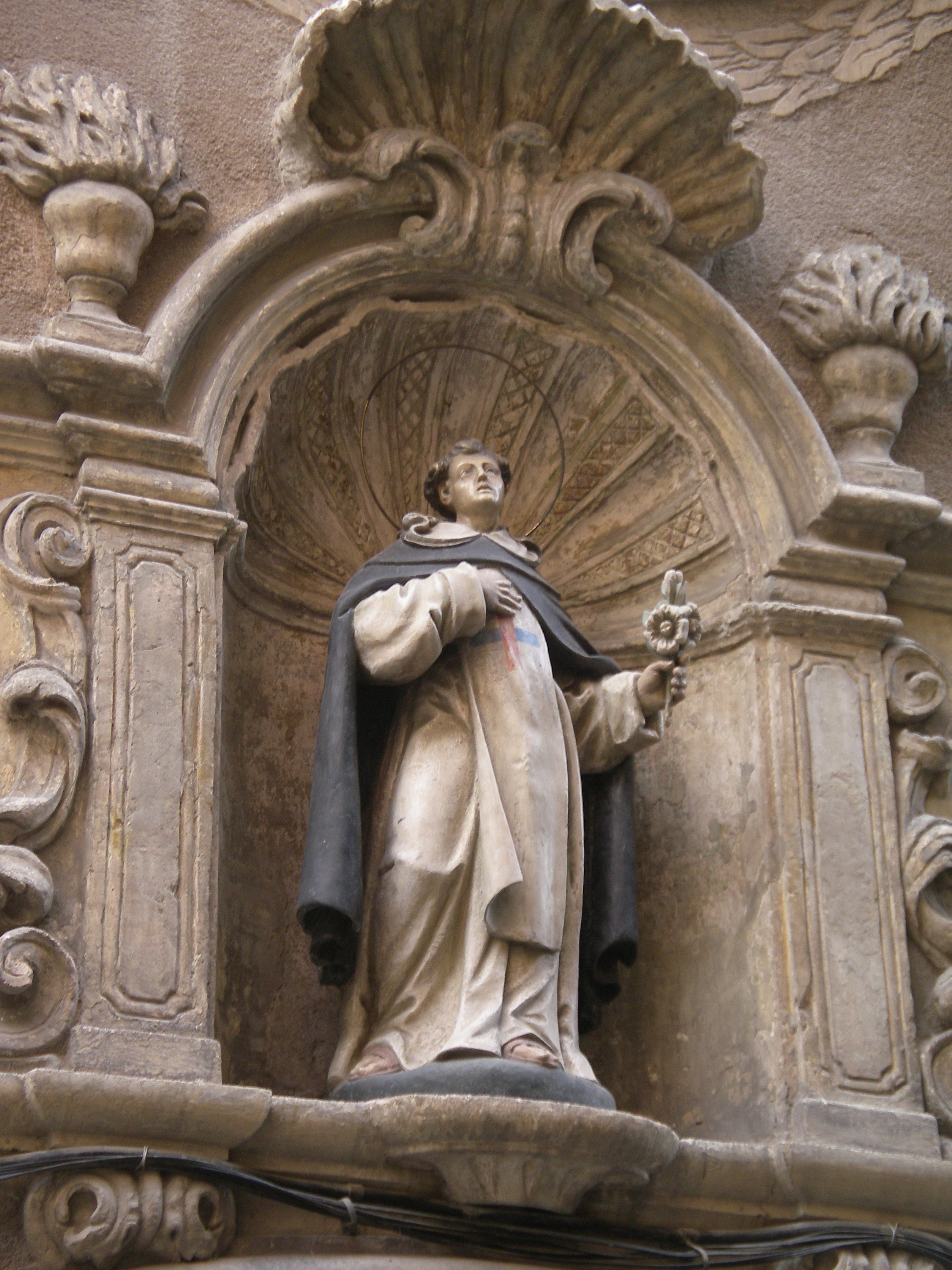
Michael de Sanctis

- September 29 – Michael de Sanctis, Spanish saint (d. 1625)
- October 2 – Margherita Gonzaga, Duchess of Lorraine (1608–1624) (d. 1632)
- October 7 – Pierre Le Muet, French architect (d. 1669)
- October 22 – Alfonso III d'Este, Duke of Modena, Italian noble (d. 1644)
- November 20 – George Albert II, Margrave of Brandenburg (d. 1615)
- November 29 – Bernhard von Mallinckrodt, German bibliophile (d. 1664)
- December 22 – Tommaso Dingli, Maltese architect and sculptor (d. 1666)
- December 30 – Joseph Furttenbach, German architect (d. 1667)

=== Date unknown ===
- David Blondel, French Protestant clergyman (d. 1655)
- Andrew Bobola, Polish Jesuit missionary and martyr (d. 1657)
- Thomas Goffe, English dramatist (d. 1629)
- William Lenthall, English politician of the Civil War period (d. 1662)
- Beata Oxenstierna, Swedish Aristocrat (d. 1652)

== Deaths ==
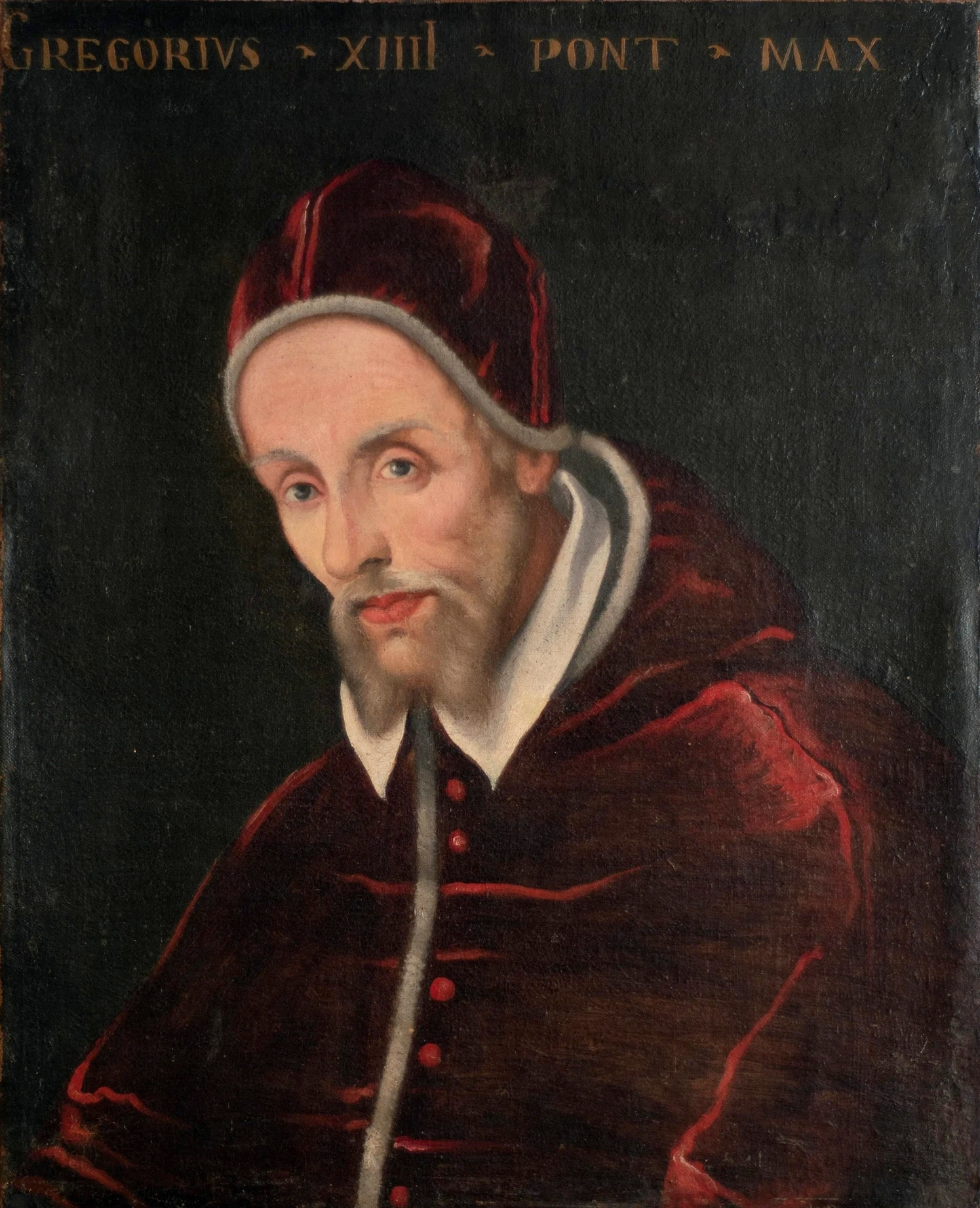
Pope Gregory XIV

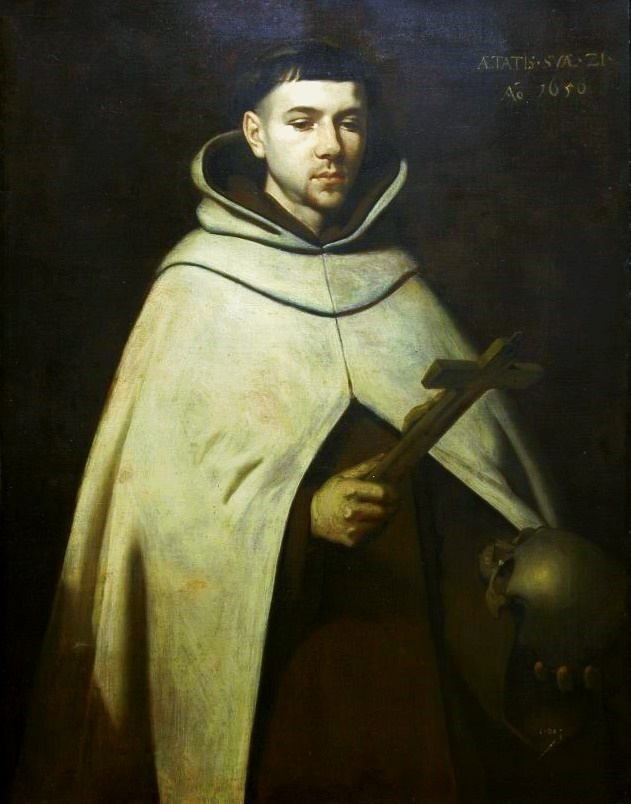
John of the Cross

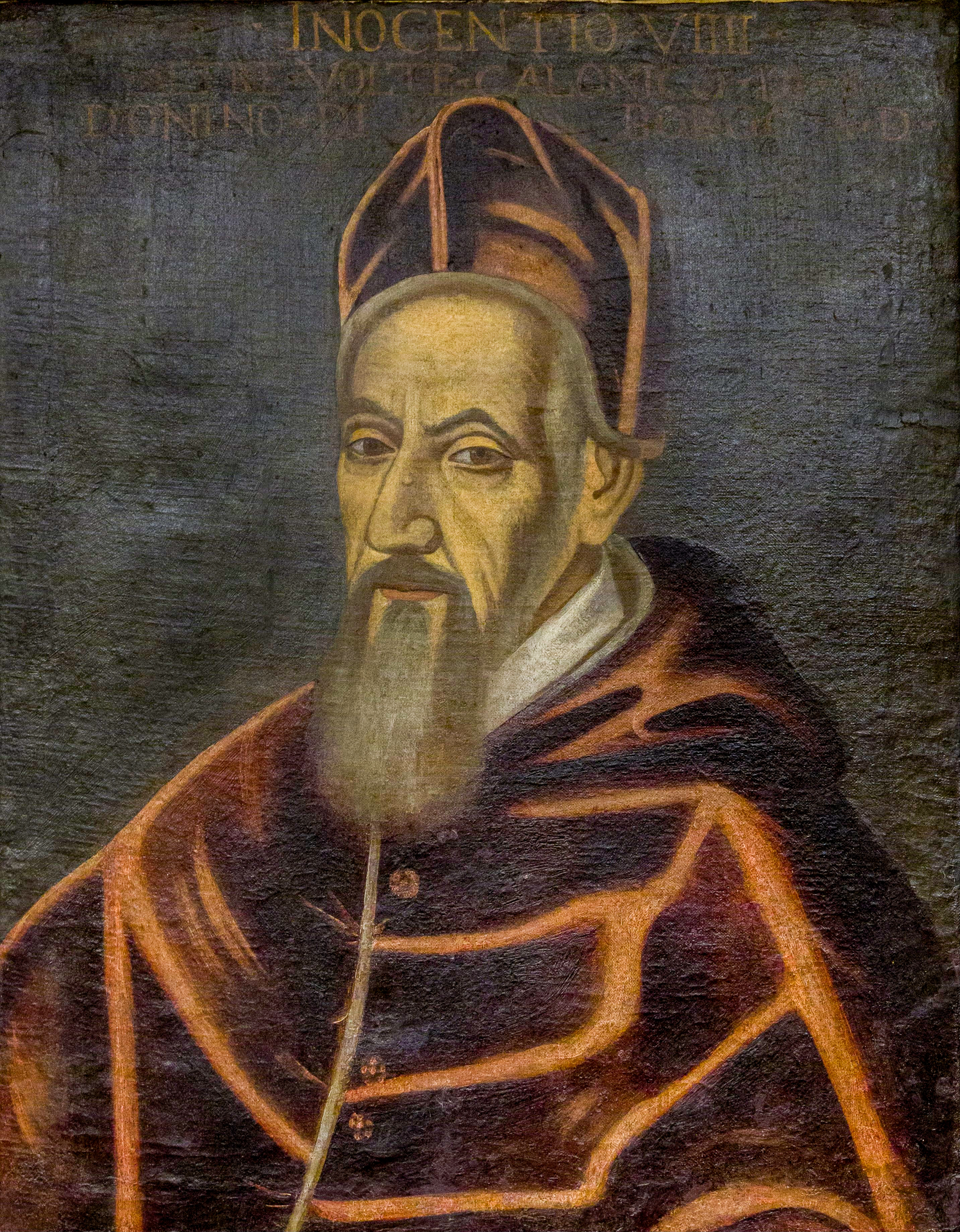
Pope Innocent IX

- February 6 – Anna Sophia of Prussia, Duchess of Prussia and Duchess of Mecklenburg (b. 1527)
- February 15 – Toyotomi Hidenaga, Japanese warlord (b. 1540)
- February 26 – Vespasiano I Gonzaga, Italian noble and diplomat (b. 1531)
- March 17 – Jost Amman, Swiss printmaker (b. 1539)
- April 9 – Emilie of Saxony, German noble (b. 1516)
- April 21 – Sen no Rikyū, Japanese exponent of the tea ceremony (b. 1522)
- May 19 – Elizabeth Cecil, 16th Baroness de Ros, English noblewoman (b. c. 1574)
- May 15 – Tsarevich Dimitri, of Russia (b. 1582)
- June 21 – Aloysius Gonzaga, Italian Jesuit and saint (b. 1568)
- July 2 – Vincenzo Galilei, Italian composer (b. 1520)
- July 10 – Anna of Hesse, Countess Palatine of Zweibrücken (b. 1529)
- July 18 – Jacobus Gallus Carniolus, Slovenian composer (b. 1550)
- August 23 – Luis Ponce de León, Spanish lyric poet (b. 1527)
- August 27 – Katheryn of Berain, Welsh noblewoman (b. 1534)
- September 7 – Heinrich Sudermann, German politician (b. 1520)
- September 10 – Richard Grenville, English soldier and explorer (b. 1542)
- September 19 – Alonso de Orozco Mena, Spanish Catholic priest (b. 1500)
- September 25 – Christian I, Elector of Saxony (b. 1560)
- September 29 – Count Johan II of East Frisia (b. 1538)
- October 15 – Duke Otto Henry of Brunswick-Harburg, Hereditary Prince of Brunswick-Lüneburg-Harburg (b. 1555)
- October 16 – Pope Gregory XIV (b. 1535)
- November 20 – Christopher Hatton, English politician (b. 1540)
- December 14 – Saint John of the Cross, Spanish Carmelite friar and poet (b. 1542)
- December 18 – Marigje Arriens, Dutch woman executed for witchcraft (b. c. 1520)
- December 30 – Pope Innocent IX (b. 1519)

=== Date unknown ===
- Ananias Dare, father of Virginia Dare, (b. circa 1560)
- Virginia Dare, first English child born in America, (b. 1587) (Unverified)
- (by February 6) – Crispin van den Broeck, Flemish painter (b. 1523)
- John Erskine of Dun, Scottish religious reformer (b. 1509)
- Veronica Franco, Italian poet and courtesan (b. 1546)
