= Siege of Nijmegen (1591) =

Siege that was part of the Eighty Years War

- Part of the Eighty Years' War & the Anglo–Spanish War & Maurice's campaign of 1591
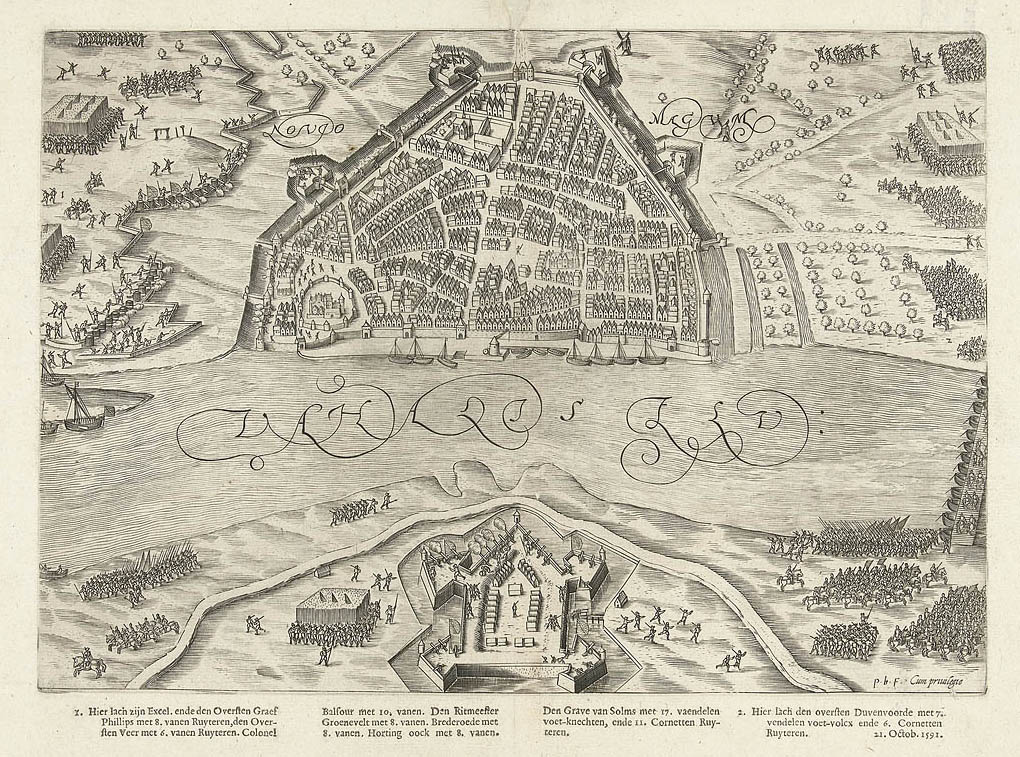
- The siege of Nijmegen in 1591 – engraving by Pieter Bast
Date	17 to 21 October 1591
Location	Nijmegen, Guelderland; Present day the Netherlands
Result	Dutch and English victory

Belligerents
Dutch Republic; England	(Spain) Spanish Empire

Commanders and leaders
(Dutch Republic) Maurice of Orange (England) Francis Vere	(Spain) Derrick Vlemminck

Strength
10,000	400

Casualties and losses
Low	300 surrendered

The siege of Nijmegen was a military engagement during the Eighty Years' War and the Anglo–Spanish War which took place from 17 to 21 October 1591. The Spanish garrison in Nijmegen was besieged by a Dutch and English force under Maurice of Nassau and Francis Vere respectively and surrendered soon.

== Background ==
Nijmegen located at the confluence of the Waal and Rhine rivers was strategically important to the defence of the Dutch provinces and the Electorate of Cologne. On the night of 10 August 1589 during the Cologne War, mercenary troops under Martin Schenck von Nydeggen attempted an assault on Nijmegen which held a small garrison. The attack failed - Schenck with nearly 150 of his men subsequently drowned in the river.

A year after Schenk’s failure the States army under Maurice of Nassau, reinforced with English troops under Francis Vere, achieved many victories. Starting off with the capture of Breda in 1590 this was followed by the capture of Zutphen, Deventer, Delfzijl and Hulst the next year.

On the north bank of Nijmegen was the outlying fortification of Knodsenburg, a highly strategic position overlooking the city which was built by the Dutch and was then garrisoned. On July 15 Alexander Farnese, the Duke of Parma reinforced Nijmegen and besieged the fort in order to thwart an Anglo-Dutch attempt to besiege the city. Under the direction of Maurice however they defeated Parma and forced his retreat ten days later. Parma was then sent by Philip II of Spain to France to fight the Huguenot war against Henry IV of France. As a result, Nijmegen was greatly weakened, and Maurice with the Anglo-Dutch decided to strike there in the autumn.

== Siege ==
On October 16 Maurice and his force bridged the deep, wide, and rapid river Waal and had transported 8,500 infantry and sixteen companies of cavalry to the southern side and surrounded the city the next day. His army was composed of 26 English and Scots companies under Vere. There were also Frisian soldiers of William Louis, a nephew of Maurice. Inside Nijmegen, the small Spanish garrison was composed of less than 400 soldiers under the command of the city burgher Derrick Vlemminck.

Maurice in the meantime had built up the fort at Knodsenburg, allowing him to bombard the city from there but was unable to convince a surrender; so a closer siege was needed.

The English and Scots under Francis Vere were employed in several attacks on the outskirts which resulted in the capture of all the outlying sconces. There the Anglo-Dutch force had entrenched their camp and made approaches towards the city. This was made easier for the besiegers in that the water level of the Waal was low. They had got 68 pieces of artillery into three positions commanding the weakest part of the defences of the city between two positions known as the Falcon Tower and the Hoender gate. At Knodsenburg the batteries being on a high position were pounding the city from across the river. The spire of St. Stephen's Church was destroyed by the shelling and also a large number of buildings in the city were destroyed.

On October 20 Maurice sent a demand to the besieged to surrender the city but his reply was rebuffed. The besiegers then opened all of their batteries without further delay in a heavy bombardment.

Within a few days however the city decided to negotiate with Maurice about a possible surrender. The result of this came from a disagreement between the cities burghers and the Spanish garrison.

== Aftermath ==
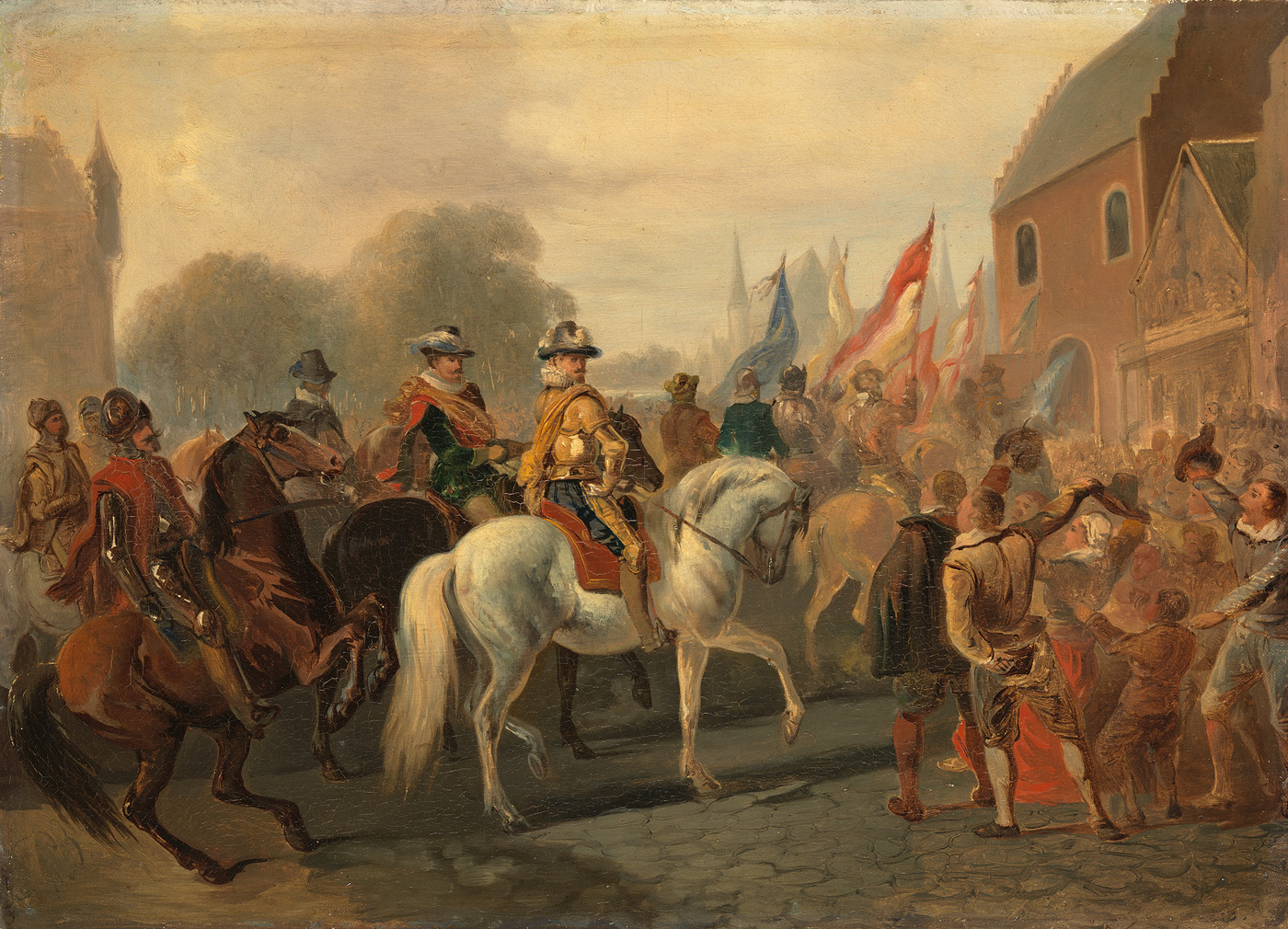
Maurice's triumphant return to The Hague

The city had set a number of conditions but Maurice did not accept these except for an absolute pardon. This was eventually agreed and thus 300 men surrendered and were given the honours of war. The terms of the surrender were similar to those accorded to Zutphen and Deventer. He also replaced the Catholic councillors with Protestant ones and the practice of the Catholic faith was no longer allowed in Nijmegen. To make his intentions sincere, the Grote Markt was burned on May 21, 1592 since it contained many Catholic images.

Another important city had been added to the domains of the republic and as part of the Union of Utrecht. Queen Elizabeth I wrote to congratulate Maurice on his great successes and even the Spaniards began to recognise the merits of his achievements. Maurice continued on the offensive and in a stunning campaign the following year he took Steenwijk in July and didn't stop until Groningen was captured in 1594 by which time all of the Drenthe region had been conquered.
