= Capture of Delfzijl =

1591 siege in the Eighty Years' War

- Part of the Eighty Years' War & the Anglo–Spanish War & Maurice's campaign of 1591
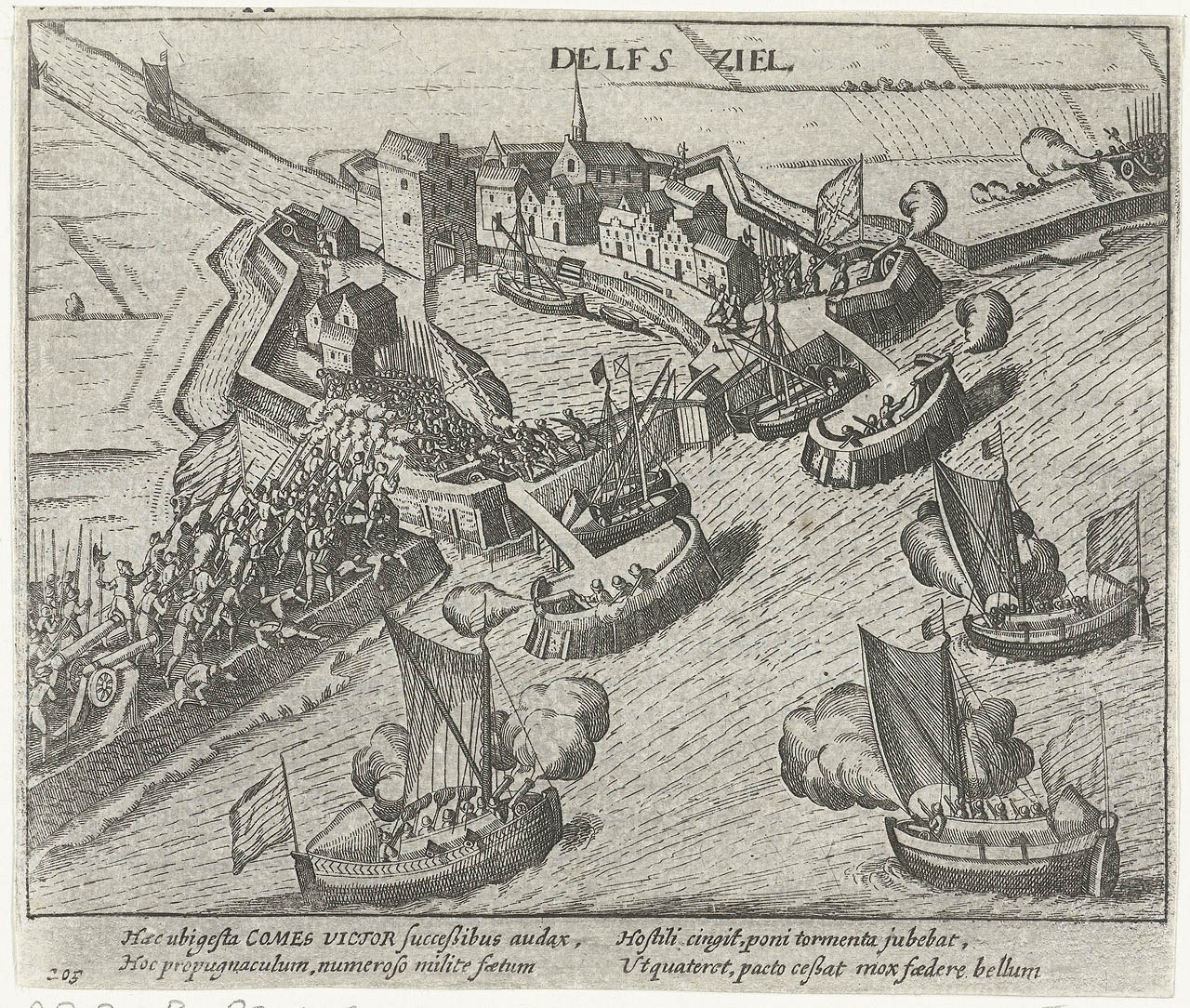
- Siege of Delfzijl July 1591; from the workshop of Frans Hogenberg
Date	26 June – 2 July 1591
Location	Delfzijl; Present-day the Netherlands
Result	Dutch & English victory

Belligerents
Dutch Republic; England	(Spain) Spanish Empire

Commanders and leaders
(Dutch Republic) Maurice of Orange (England) Francis Vere	(Spain) unknown

Strength
9,000	300; 10 guns

Casualties and losses
Low	All surrendered

The Capture of Delfzijl took place during the Eighty Years' War and the Anglo–Spanish War by a Dutch and English army led by Maurice of Orange. The siege commenced on 26 June and lasted until the Spanish troops surrendered the city of Delfzijl on 2 July 1591.

== Events ==
=== Background ===
In early 1591, Maurice had begun a campaign to push the Spanish out of the Netherlands - the States General of the Netherlands wanted Nijmegen to be taken, but complications arose of its capture, so surrounding towns and cities such as Zutphen and Deventer had to be taken before any siege took place. The strategy was to draw the Spanish troops and make them think the real objective was elsewhere. First Zutphen and then Deventer were both taken by Dutch troops under Maurice and English troops under Francis Vere respectively. The next target was Groningen in the North as two years before William Louis, Count of Nassau-Dillenburg, had captured a sconce at Zoutkamp, providing an initial impetus to eventually besiege Groningen. This was soon abandoned by Maurice as it was still considered too strong to besiege, and in addition the threatened approach of the Duke of Parma with his army.

=== Capture ===
Maurice instead went directly to the North - his target was the town and fortress of Delfzijl which lay on the shores of the Dollart, a large inlet dividing the province of Groningen from the German district of Emden, a Spanish supply base. On June 26, 1591, the Anglo-Dutch army came before the fortress - they had used 150 boats along the waterways to transport their heavy artillery. The Spanish garrison in Delfzijl numbered only 300 troops and ten guns and both sides knew they were in for a short siege. Siege positions were established in front of the town and when the guns were all in position, they opened fire. Sure enough after a heavy bombardment in the first few days of the siege the Spanish garrison, realising no relief was forthcoming, had had enough and began negotiations for surrender on 2 July. Maurice eventually agreed and the Spanish garrison surrendered and was allowed to leave (except for the disloyal and defectors) under terms for Groningen.

=== Aftermath ===
Francisco Verdugo, the Spanish governor in the province of Groningen, was enraged when they arrived there. He ordered the captains beheaded and then humiliated the soldiers. Twelve soldiers were chosen by a lot to be imprisoned; five of these were also beheaded later.

Maurice, after taking Delfzijl, reinforced the fortifications there according to the original plans of Johan van den Kornput and placed a small garrison of Dutch and English inside. In early 1594, the garrison was able to repel a Spanish attack led by Francisco Verdugo.

Maruice then marched from Delfzijl and advanced towards Hulst and Nijmegen. Maurice and the Dutch and English army instead had to come before Knodsenburg where they defeated the Duke of Parma attempting to besiege the place.
