= Siege of Knodsenburg =

1591 siege of the Eighty Years' War

- Part of the Eighty Years' War & the Anglo–Spanish War & Maurice's campaign of 1591
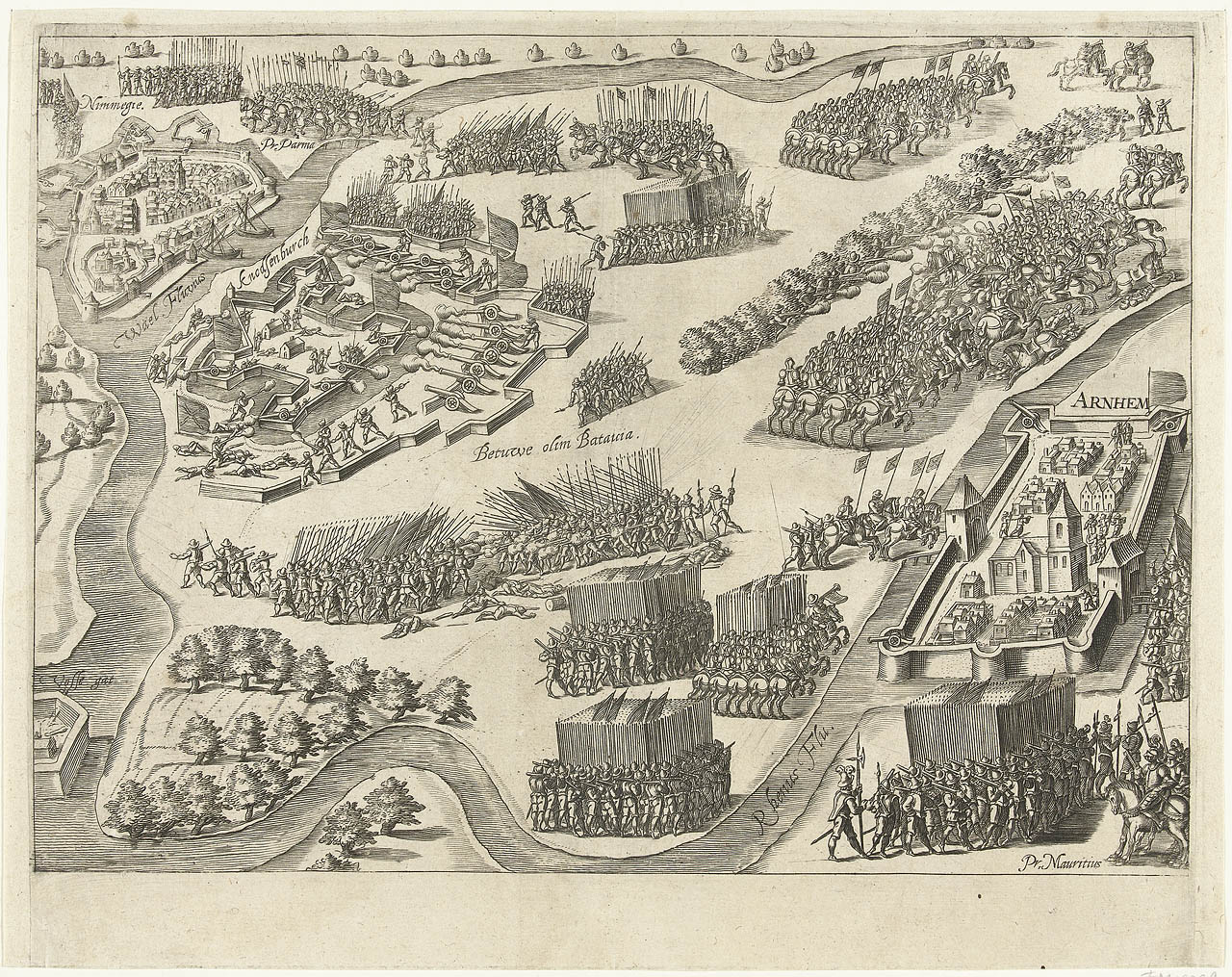
- Map showing the relief of Knodsenburg, 1591 by Bartholomeus Dolendo
Date	21 – 25 July 1591
Location	Knodsenburg, Betuwe, near Nijmegen (present-day the Netherlands) 51.8549°N 5.8641°E
Result	Anglo-Dutch victory

Belligerents
Dutch Republic; England	(Spain) Spanish Empire

Commanders and leaders
(Dutch Republic) Maurice of Orange (England) Francis Vere (Dutch Republic) Gerrit de Jong	(Spain) Duke of Parma (Spain) Petro Nicelli Francisco (POW)

Strength
8,000 infantry 2,000 cavalry	7,000 infantry 1,800 cavalry

Casualties and losses
100	900 killed, wounded or captured

The siege of Knodsenburg, Relief of Knodzenburg or also known as Battle of the Betuwe was a military action that took place during the Eighty Years' War and the Anglo–Spanish War at a sconce known as Knodsenburg in the district of Nijmegen. A siege by a Spanish army under the command of the Duke of Parma took place from 15 to 25 July 1591. The fort was defended by the Dutch Republic's commander Gerrit de Jong and his company which was then subsequently relieved through the intervention of a Dutch and English army led by Maurice of Orange and Francis Vere, respectively, on 25 July. As a result, the Spanish army was defeated though Parma managed to retreat by getting his army across the River Waal.

== Background ==
In 1590 Maurice of Orange decided to strengthen the possibility of besieging Nijmegen, by spreading out the defences and building a fort, a kind of redan, on the city side on high ground. Once built the fort was put into use as a base for an attack on Nijmegen. This became known as Knodsenburg and it lay on the Betuwe, a large river island. Parma had been aware of the high ground and had been defeated by John Norreys in 1585 in an attempt to capture this strategic position. By the end of July, 1590, the fort at Knodsenburg was finished.

Parma decided once more to return to lay siege and capture it making the possibility of the Dutch and English troops besieging Nijmegen an impossible task. Inside the fort was a small garrison consisting of six hundred men manned by a large number of guns under the command of Gerrit de Jong, former garrison commander of Lochem. De Jong intended to defend it at all cost but at the same time was relying on a relief force.

De Jong had a messenger sent to Maurice on 15 July who was outside Steenwijk to keep informed of Parma's movements. On 21 July, De Jong had communications opened by using signals from Dutch held Arnhem with the use of gun shots or fires lit from the church tower. Maurice at that time was engaged in a campaign which saw his forces retake of Zutphen, Deventer, and had captured Delfzijl. The Spanish troops under Parma were approaching Knodsenburg and Maurice informed of this movement then took a large part of his army across the Rouveen swamp, where an army had never previously crossed. Count William Louis in the meantime was left shadowing the Spanish garrison at Groningen. The force headed via Hasselt, Zwolle, and then to Deventer, then on 18 July Maurice crossed a bridge of boats over the IJssel at Zutphen and arrived at Arnhem on 20 July.

== Siege ==
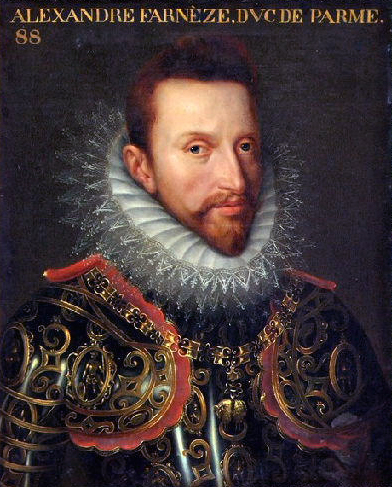
Alexander Farnese, Duke of Parma by Otto van Veen

On 21 July Parma soon surrounded and then laid siege to the sconce of Knodsenburg. In that time Gerrit de Jong and his men managed to keep the besiegers at bay having had batteries installed which were firing daily on the newly installed Spanish siege positions. Later that day the son of Peter Ernst I von Mansfeld, Octavio Mansfelt, charged to the top of the parapet of the Spanish siege line to boost morale of the Spanish but was killed instantly by a matchlock ball.

Early in the following morning the Spaniards assaulted the position; De Jong and his men waited until they were inside the fort and then suddenly opened fire with five or six guns. The foot soldiers fired a volley and then advanced with the pike. In a short time they were among the attackers and drove them back, inflicting more than 200 casualties including some senior officers killed. The attack was eventually repulsed with only three guns being damaged or made unusable. Maurice had meanwhile approached the Rhine and then set up camp later that day. The following day Parma planned to move forward but because of heavy rainfall he decided to entrench his positions.

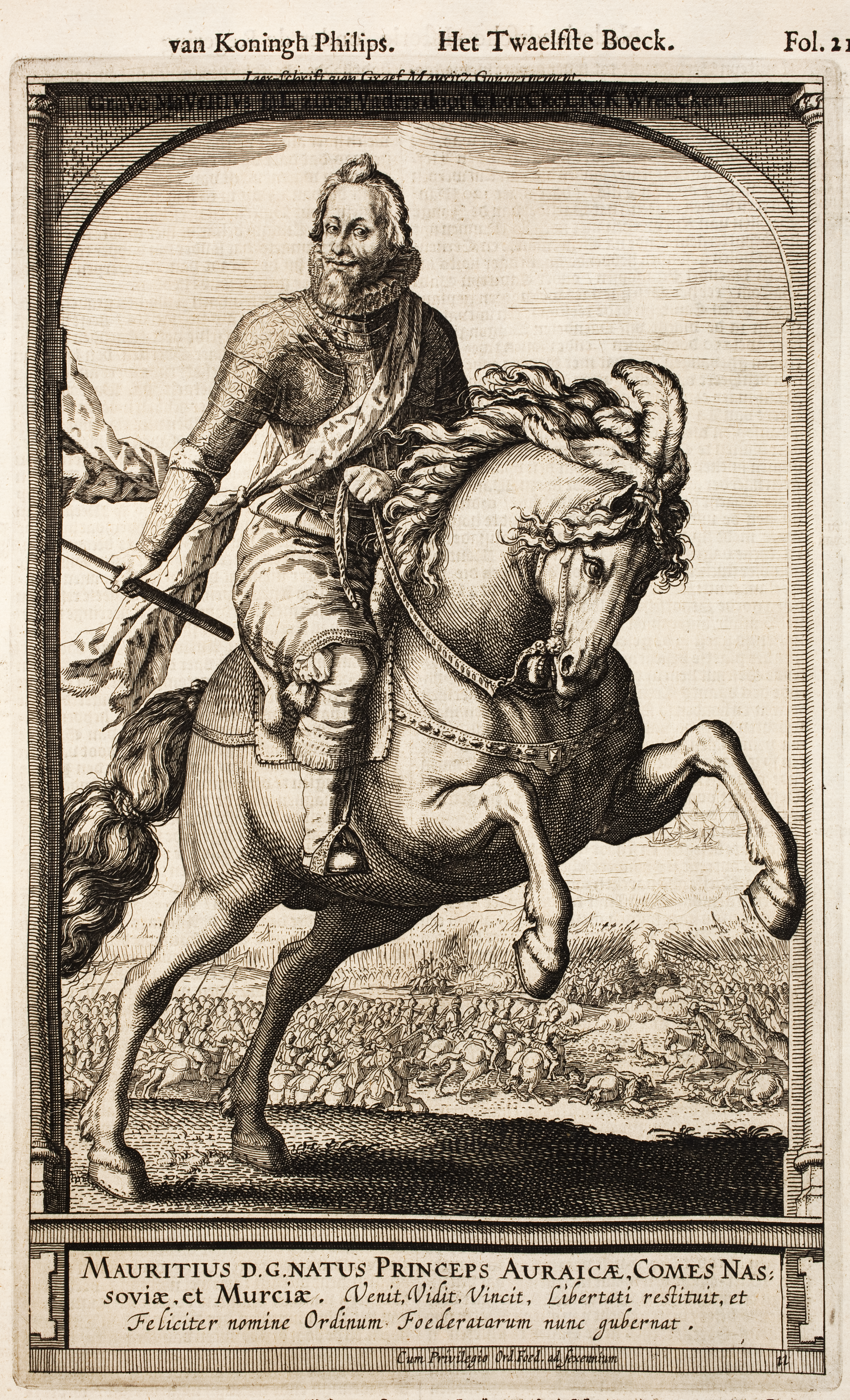
Maurice of Nassau, Prince of Orange from Emanuel van Meteren's Historien der Nederlanden

On 23 July, Maurice went forth and it was whilst approaching the Rhine that scouts reported to Parma of the approach of the Dutch and English army. Maurice's combined Dutch and English army at Arnhem consisted of a large (and recently reinforced) English regiment, commanded by Francis Vere; seventeen companies numbering over 3,000 men. In addition there were ten companies of William Balfour's Scots numbering 1,300 men, eight companies from Solms's of 1,000 men, Philip of Nassau's six companies of 900 men (including Maurice's footguards), the companies of Famars, 700 men, and Van Brederodes seven companies of 600 men. With more reinforcements coming the total number of Dutch, English, and Scots now numbered nearly 8,000 foot and 1,200 horse.

Spanish troops had plundered small villages nearby on the Betuwe and across the Rhine. This was mistaken by the Dutch and English however as a feint by Parma; a possible attack on Arnhem, so as a result the garrison there was reinforced.

Maurice had heard from recent intelligence across the Rhine that the sconce was besieged by 6–7,000 men with 1,800 horsemen, many of these troops were veteran Tercios. Maurice had an army equal in size to that of Parma and so his army crossed the Rhine in barges and then set up camp. The distance between the two armies in the Betuwe was four or five miles, along the two routes leading from Arnhem to Nijmegen. One route ran along a dyke wall raised above the low lands, and was most used in winter; the other was broader.

On the 24th Parma hoped to lure Maurice into a trap and had a great advantage in the terrain and key positions held; Parma was prepared for a pitched battle even though his assault on Knodsenburg was repelled. The Spanish kept in check the Dutch scouts by their cavalry and had severely mauled a detachment of Dutch lancers and carabiniers early in the day.

=== Parma's defeat ===
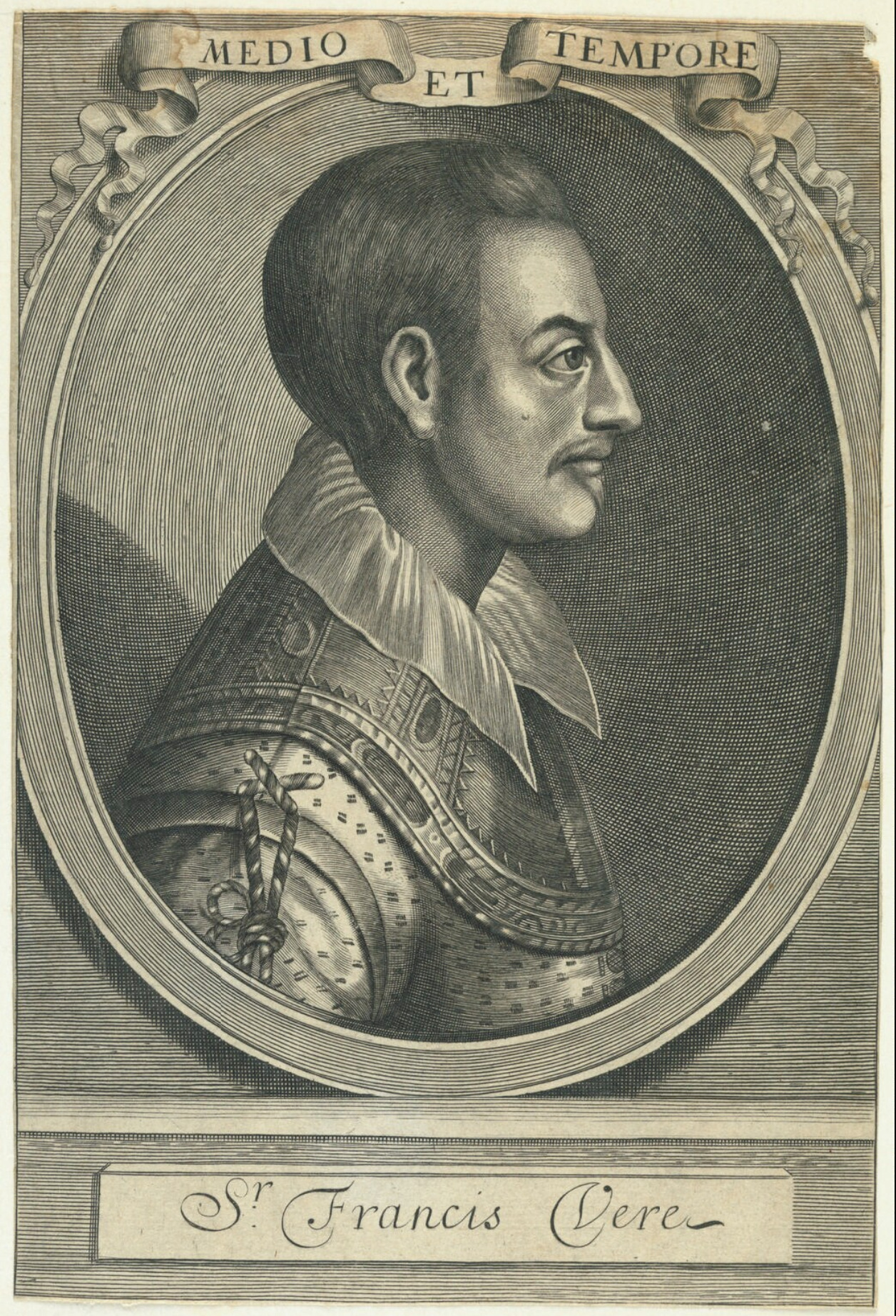
Francis Vere - by William Faithorne

Vere decided on a plan to take advantage of the Spanish activity and this required the deployment of a body of English – 500 horse and 1,200 musketeers and pikemen, a force which was readily placed under his orders by Maurice. About two thirds of the way from the Anglo-Dutch camp there was a bridge over the broader road which Vere marched to early the next morning. He sent 200 light horse to attack the Spanish outposts and then retreat where they would be caught by the Spanish veterans. In the meantime he placed his infantry in ambush, one detachment close to the bridge, the other about a quarter of a mile further back, and the rest of his cavalry in the rear. Vere hoped he would be able to lure Parma's seasoned veterans of Spaniards and Italian Tercios into a fight.

The Dutch and English cavalry rode in groups of "hit and run" and were chased by the Spanish, until they came to the bridge, there turned and suddenly went on the attack as planned. Vere got exactly what he wanted in a perfect ambush with his five companies of concealed but prepared cavalry and English soldiers ready to strike. The Spanish veterans were caught in the open and were suddenly surrounded and in the fierce fight that followed were thus badly mauled. Only a few Spanish managed to escape and retreated in disorder leaving Parma disheartened with the heavy casualties his tercios had suffered; sixty casualties, another 500 prisoners, 500 horses, and also another two banners captured. This included the commander of the force Pedro Nicelli Francisco, along with his ensign carrying a banner of Christ on the Cross which was given to Vere as a prize. Vere's detached force suffered no more than two dead and ten wounded.

After Parma's repulse at the sconce and the fact that the best part of his army had been mauled and now at a significant disadvantage to the Dutch and English, he decided the best option was to retreat. The Spanish had lost hundreds of soldiers and some officers whilst besieging; both to disease and combat On the 25th Parma decided to distract Maurice's plans and set the Spanish camps on fire and thus using this as a cover, raised the siege and retreated across the Waal, just above Nijmegen. This manoeuvre was ably conducted by Ranuccio Farnese, the Duke's eldest son.

Crossing the Waal was a feat that Parma had achieved in just five hours with two thousand soldiers digging a crescent shaped redoubt in order to cover the retreat. Parma left overnight and the entire army; with all the batteries, ammunition, and baggage they managed to cross the river unmolested which was a masterpiece in logistical moving. Once Parma had disappeared from the area Knodsenburg was therefore relieved and the Anglo-Dutch force were victorious.

== Aftermath ==
Parma and the younger Maurice were very evenly matched and Parma did not expect that Maurice would appear at his front so quickly. Maurice on the other hand did not expect that Parma would take into account a possible retreat. Parma stayed briefly in Nijmegen, but had received orders from King Philip II of Spain to call him to France to deal with the Protestants there which the Spanish were helping the French Catholics trying to quell. He left Nijmegen on 5 August, retired to Spa and left a strong garrison in Nijmegen leaving Francisco Verdugo in command. Maurice on the other hand knew Nijmegen was his next target and went to Arnhem.

The garrison of Nijmegen were expecting a siege but they were soon surprised; Maurice's army disappeared from the scene. Maurice left part of his army in the surrounding cities, and then went with three hundred ships containing four thousand of his best soldiers. As a deception plan hoping to weaken Nijmegen's defence he set forth to Spanish-held Hulst where on 21 September he captured the place. The plan worked and soon after returned to Knodsenburg in order to besiege Nijmegen which the Spanish soon surrendered leaving Maurice with another prize.

News of the Anglo-Dutch victory over Parma was greeted with delight amongst the States General and in England. A ballad was written by a Londoner titled the Happie Ouerthrowe of the Prince of Parma his powers before the knodtsen burg sconce xxj of July 1591.

== Cultural ==
English dramatist George Chapman who fought in the campaign under Vere wrote a poem regarding the siege and the defeat of Parma in his Hymnus in Cynthiam part of The Shadow of Night.

== See also ==
- Assault on Nijmegen (1589)
- List of stadtholders in the Low Countries
- List of governors of the Spanish Netherlands

== Bibliography ==
- Dunthorne, Hugh (2013). Britain and the Dutch Revolt 1560–1700. Cambridge University Press. ISBN 978-0521837477.
- Duffy, Christopher (2013). Siege Warfare: The Fortress in the Early Modern World 1494–1660 Vol. 1 of Siege Warfare. Routledge. ISBN 978-1136607875.
- Fissel, Mark Charles (2001). English Warfare, 1511–1642; Warfare and History. London: Routledge. ISBN 978-0-415-21481-0.
- Hoenselaars, A. J (1994). Reclamations of Shakespeare Vol. 15 of DQR Studies in Literature. Rodopi. ISBN 978-9051836066.
- Markham, C. R (2007). The Fighting Veres: Lives of Sir Francis Vere and Sir Horace Vere. Kessinger Publishing. ISBN 978-1432549053.
- van Nimwegen, Olaf (2010). The Dutch Army and the Military Revolutions, 1588–1688 Vol. 31 of Warfare in History Series. Boydell & Brewer. ISBN 978-1843835752.
- Nolan, John S (1997). Sir John Norreys and the Elizabethan Military World. Exter: University of Exeter Press. ISBN 0859895483. OCLC 38572481.
- Wernham, R.B (1984). After the Armada: Elizabethan England and the Struggle for Western Europe : 1588–1595. Clarendon Press. ISBN 978-0198227533.
- van der Hoeven, Marco (1997). Exercise of Arms: Warfare in the Netherlands, 1568–1648, Vol. 1. Brill. ISBN 978-9004107274.
