= Maurice's campaign of 1591 =

1591 campaign by Maurice of Nassau

- Part of the Eighty Years' War and the Anglo-Spanish War
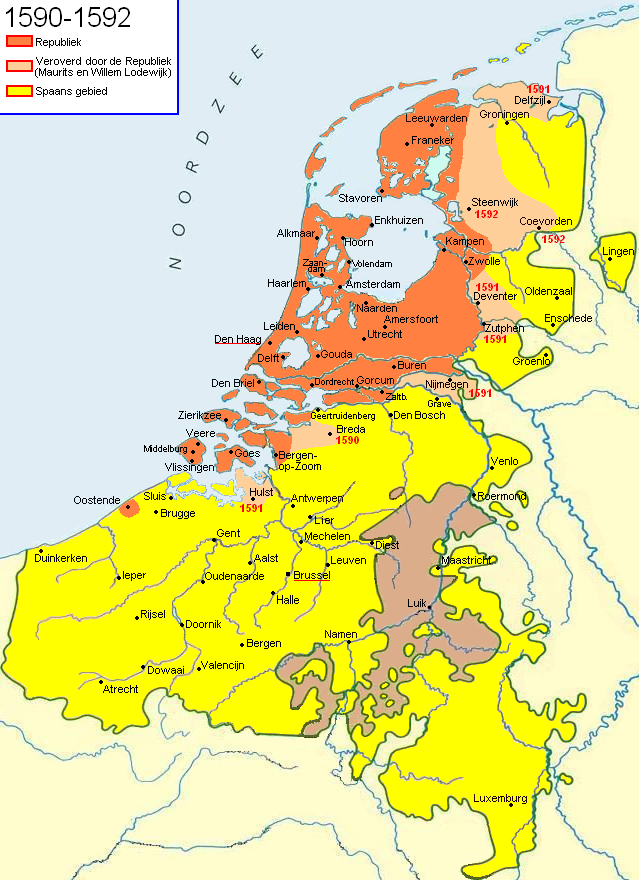
- Depiction of all area's conquered by Maurice of Nassau
Date	Throughout 1591
Location	The Netherlands
Result	Anglo–Dutch victory
Territorial changes	Capture of Zutphen, Deventer, Delfzijl, Knodsenburg, Hulst and Nijmegen

Belligerents
Dutch Republic; England	(Spain) Spanish Empire

Commanders and leaders
(Dutch Republic) Maurice of Orange (England) Francis Vere	(Spanish Empire) Alexander Farnese (Spanish Empire) Herman van den Bergh

Strength
10,000	Unknown

Maurice's 1591 campaign was a major campaign during the Eighty Years' War, during the campaign Maurice of Nassau was able to recapture the cities of Nijmegen, Deventer, Zutphen, Delfzijl, Hulst and Knodsenburg.

== Background ==
In October 1578, Philip II of Spain sent Alexander Farnese, Duke of Parma to the Spanish Netherlands as governor and to reconquer the territories previously occupied by the rebels who proclaimed the Union of Utrecht shortly after.

During his service as governor, Alexander Farnese reconquered a lot of territories previously held by the proclaimed Union of Utrecht, including the cities that were captured during the campaign.

In 1585, Maurice of Nassau became Stadtholder of Holland and Zeeland. Shortly after he conducted military reforms that improved the Dutch States Army and made the rebellion against Spain more organized. In 1590, Maurice captured Breda and Steenbergen, which allowed Maurice to launch his respective campaign.

== Campaign ==
In 1590, discussions were already made to start the campaign. The States General discussed over which city would be captured during this campaign, Nijmegen was one of many that was agreed on the recapture. The States General also agreed to capture Zutphen over Geertruidenberg even though it was recaptured by Parma, but they prioritized Zutphen over Geertruidenberg due to the garrison stationed there could cause more damage to the one in Geertruidenberg.

=== Zutphen ===
The siege of the city of Zutphen was the first major conflict during this campaign. Maurice of Nassau commenced this siege on the 19th of May and it ended on the 30th of May, the siege lasted 11 days until the garrison was forced to surrender. The city was recaptured by rebel forces.

=== Deventer ===
The siege of Deventer took place shortly after the siege of Zutphen. The siege lasted from 1 June to 10 June. The rebel forces recaptured the city from the Spanish garrison led by Herman van den Bergh.

=== Delfzijl ===
The capture of Delfzijl began 16 days after the siege of Deventer on 26 June and ended on 2 July. The city was recaptured by the rebel forces after the entire garrison surrendered.

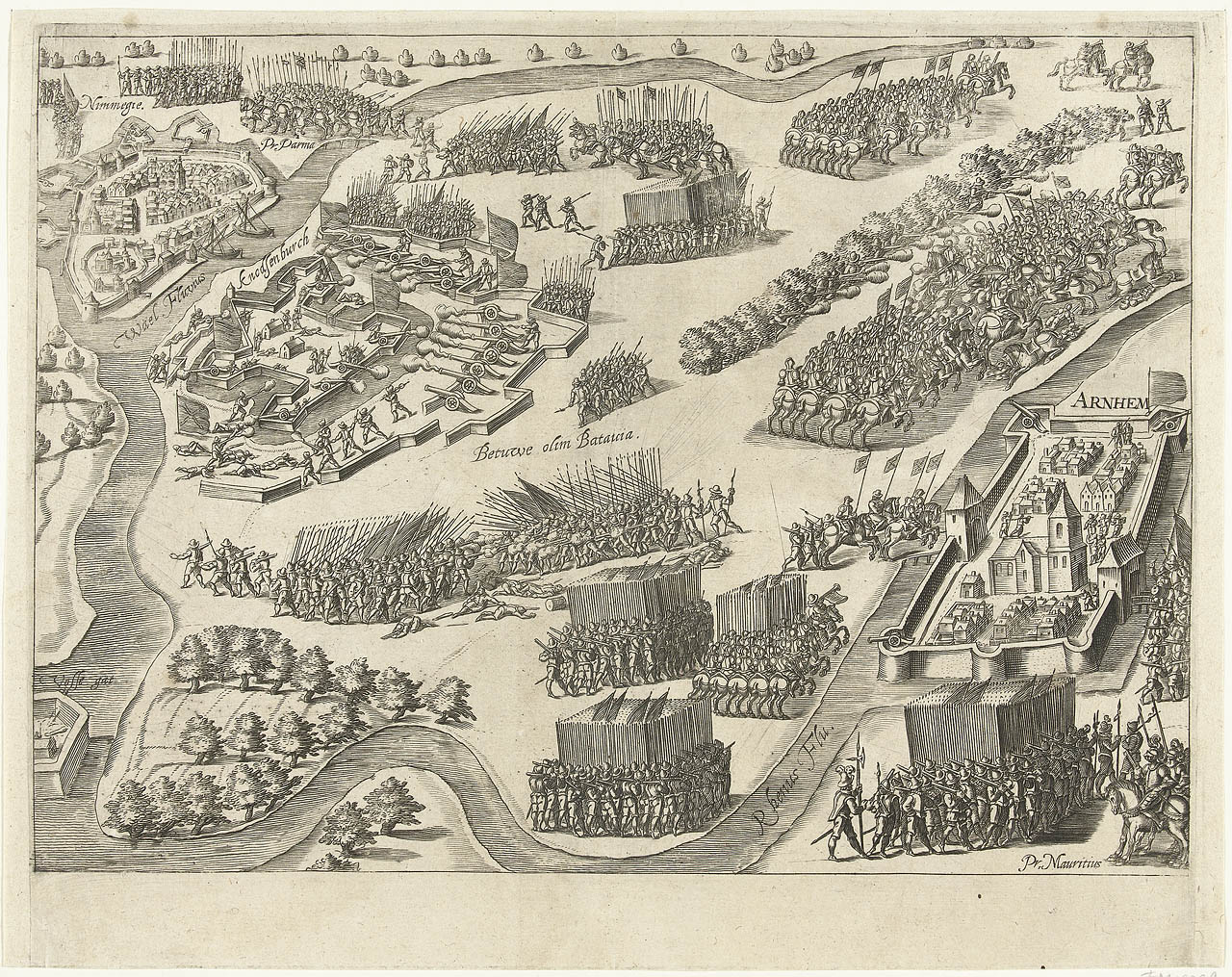
The Siege of Knodsenburg was the most major action of this campaign

=== Knodsenburg ===
The siege of Knodsenburg was the major conflict during this campaign. The Spanish forces led by Alexander Farnese attacked the city on 21 July. The garrison, led by Gerrit de Jong was relieved by an intervention by Maurice of Nassau and Francis Vere. On 25 July, four days after the siege started, Parma was defeated and managed to retreat through the River Waal.

=== Hulst ===
The siege of Hulst lasted from 20 to 24 September. The commander of the Spanish garrison, Colonel Castillo, asked for terms after five days of resistance, which were accepted.

=== Nijmegen ===
The siege of Nijmegen was the last conflict of this campaign, it lasted from 17 to 21 October, after the Spanish garrison, led by Derrick Vlemminck was forced to surrender. Afterwards the Spanish negotiated the surrender of the city.

== Aftermath ==
Within a year, a lot of territories were reconquered by Maurice's army. Maurice later captured Steenwijk, and Coevorden in 1592. This cut off Groningen from Twente, which he would utilize to capture Groningen, which expelled the Spanish from the Northern Provinces.

A few years after, Maurice started another campaign in 1597, in which he captured more Spanish held cities. These two campaigns were the height of his ten years' campaign.

== Sources ==
- Nuyens, Willem J.F (1869). Geschiedenis der Nederlandsche beroerten in de XVIe eeuw: Geschiedenis van de vorming van de republiek der zeven vereenigde provincien, (1584-1598) (E-book ed.). C.L van Langenhuysen.
- Watson, Robert (1839). The History of the Reign of Philip the Second, King of Spain (E-book ed.). Tegg.
- Chrystin, Jean-Baptiste (1786). Les délices des Pays-Bas (E-book ed.). Université de Lausanne.
