= Joseph Furttenbach =

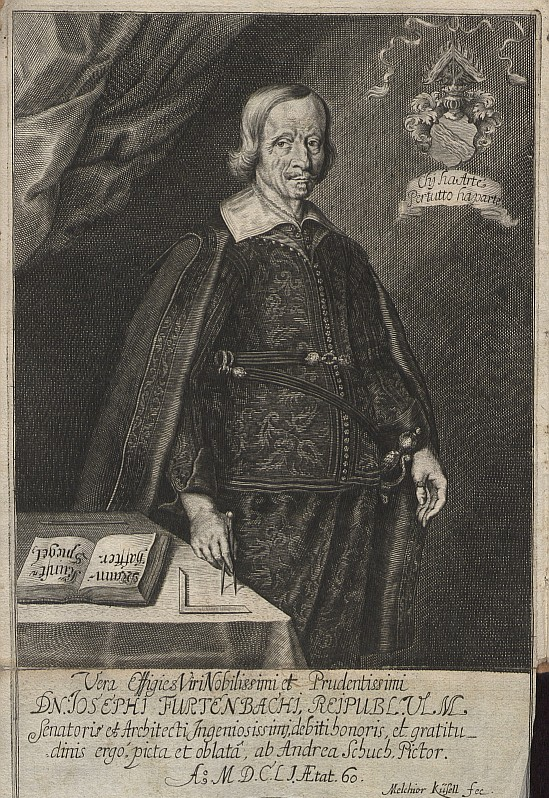
Portrait of Joseph Furttenbach

Joseph Furttenbach the Elder (30 December 1591 – 17 January 1667) was a German architect, mathematician, engineer and diarist.

== Biography ==
Joseph Furttenbach was born in Leutkirch, Germany. From 1607/08 to 1620 he stayed in Italy (especially in Milan, Genoa and Florence). There he did an apprenticeship as a merchant under the supervision of his uncles. Moreover, he studied engineering, military architecture and grew an interest in theatre and stage design while abroad. Through his travels he made detailed accounts of buildings that interested him as well as festivals, processions and dramatic performances. In three of his books he wrote expositions on scenery and lighting for the theatre. He is only second to Nicola Sabbatini as one of the most extensive accounts of backstage practices during the Renaissance.

After his stay in Italy, he moved back to Germany and settled in Ulm. There, he had a successful career as an architect and universal engineer. He designs included a hospital, a waterworks system, a schoolhouse, a theatre, and homes. He was eventually named city architect of Ulm, wrote many books, and served on the city council. His cabinet of curiosities was one of the most famous in Germany. A pious Lutheran, Furttenbach was at the same time an important cultural broker between Baroque Italy and Southern Germany.

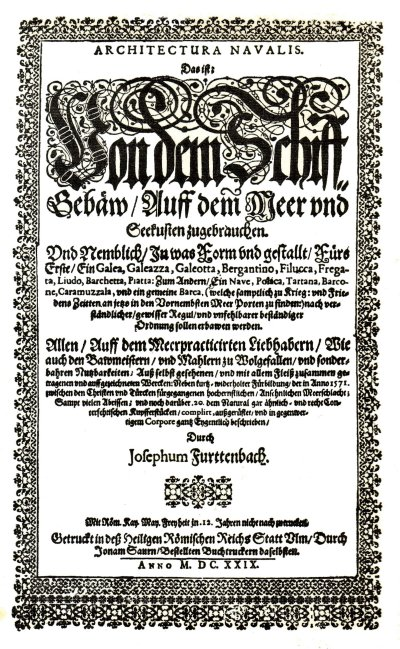
tFrontispiece of Furttenbach's 1629 Architectura Navalis

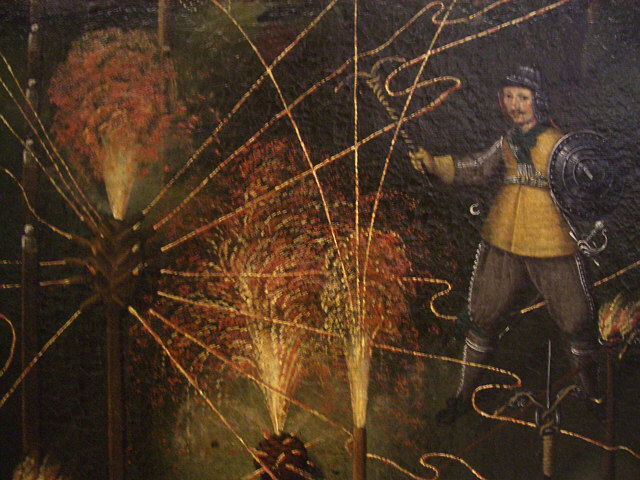
Part of a painting by J. Furttenbach: Feuerwerkh, welches Herr Johann Kouhn, den 26. Augusti Anno 1644 in seinem garten uff dem word, hat abgehen lassen (1645)

== Sources ==
- Nicoll, Allardyce, John H. McDowell, and George R. Kernodle, trans. The Renaissance Stage; Documents of Serlio, Sabbattini and Furttenbach. Ed. Barnard Hewitt. Coral Gables, Florida: University of Miami, 1958. Print.
- Joseph Furttenbach, Lebenslauff 1652-1664, critical edition of his diary, ed. by Kaspar von Greyerz, Kim Siebenhüner and Roberto Zaugg, Böhlau, Cologne, 2013.
