= Jean Bagot =

Jean Bagot (French: [bago]; 9 July 1591 – 23 August 1664) was a Jesuit theologian.

Bagot was born at Rennes, France. He entered the Society of Jesus, 1 July 1611, taught belles-lettres for many years at various colleges in France, philosophy for five years, theology for thirteen years, and became theologian to the General of the Society. In 1647 he published the first part of his work Apologeticus Fidei titled Institutio Theologica de vera Religione In 1645 the second part, Demonstratio dogmatum Christianorum, appeared, and in 1646 Dissertationes theologicae on the Sacrament of Penance. In his Avis aux Catholiques, Bagot attacked the new doctrine on grace, directing against it also his Lettre sur la conformite de S. Augustin. In 1653 his Libertatis et gratiae defensio was published.

In 1655 Rousse, Curé of Saint Roch (or Masure, the Curé of St. Paul's), published a little work titled De l'obligation des fidèles de se confesser a leur cure, suivant le chapitre 21 du concile general de Latran. Bagot answered this in his Défense du droit épiscopal et de la liberté des fidèles, which he afterwards translated into Latin. A controversy arose, in which various ecclesiastics, including Pierre de Marca, Archbishop of Toulouse, took sides against Bagot. The work was referred to the faculty of theology at Paris, which censured some of the propositions. Bagot, however, defended his doctrine before this assembly with the result that the censure was removed. he answered his opponents in the Réponse du P. Bagot. On his return from Rome he devoted the remaining years of his life to the congregation of the Blessed Virgin, and died superior of the professed house at Paris.
