= Siege of Deventer (1591) =

1591 siege in the Netherlands

Coordinates: 52°15′N 6°9′E

- Part of the Eighty Years' War & Maurice's campaign of 1591
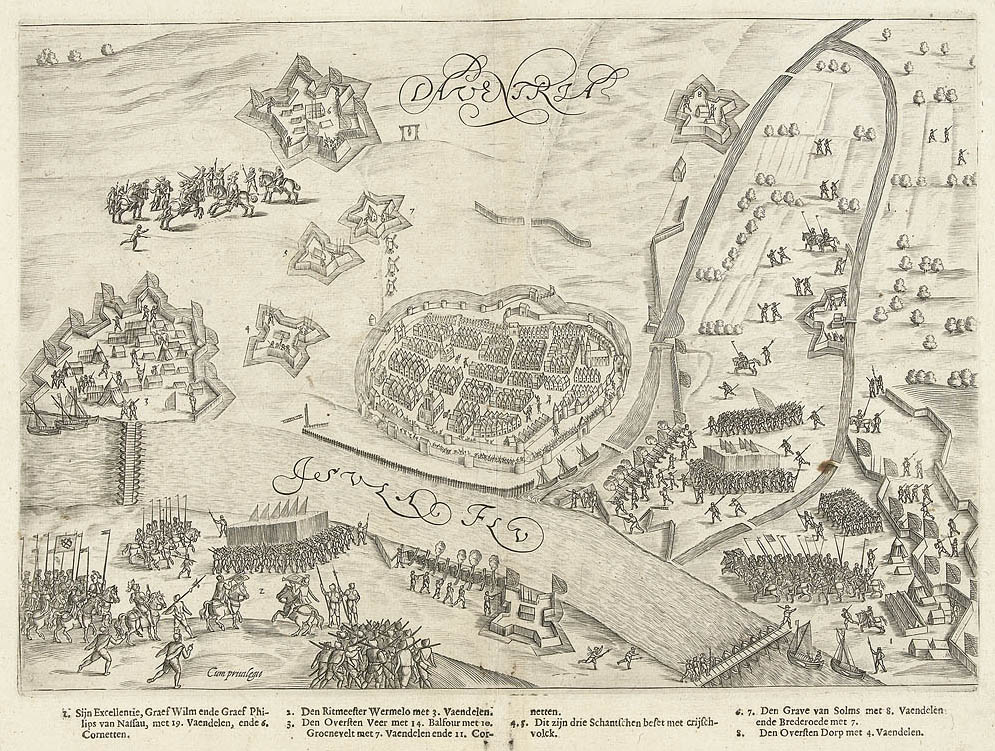
- The siege of Deventer in 1591 - print by Bartholomeus Dolendo
| Date | 1–10 June 1591 |
| Location | Deventer, Overijssel (present-day the Netherlands) |
| Result | Dutch-English victory |

Belligerents
| Dutch Republic; England | (Spain) Spanish Empire |

Commanders and leaders
| (Dutch Republic) Maurice of Nassau (Kingdom of England) Francis Vere | (Spain) Herman van den Bergh |

Strength
| 9,000 infantry 1,600 cavalry 28 guns | 1,200 |

Casualties and losses
| 200 | All surrendered |

The siege of Deventer was a siege of the city of Deventer from 1 to 10 June 1591 during the Eighty Years' War by Dutch and English troops under Maurice of Nassau in an attempt to retake it from its Spanish garrison, commanded by Herman van den Bergh on behalf of the Spanish.

== Background ==
The city had first been captured by the States in 1579 but regained by the Spanish in the meantime after its betrayal by English turncoat governor William Stanley.

After the capture of Zutphen which surrendered on 30 May 1591 Maurice of Orange with his Anglo-Dutch army marched towards Deventer on the right bank of the river IJssel. Maurice's force numbered 9,000 infantry and 1,200 cavalry, half of the force came from the British Isles - fourteen English companies under Sir Francis Vere and the ten Scots companies under Colonel William Balfour.

== Siege ==
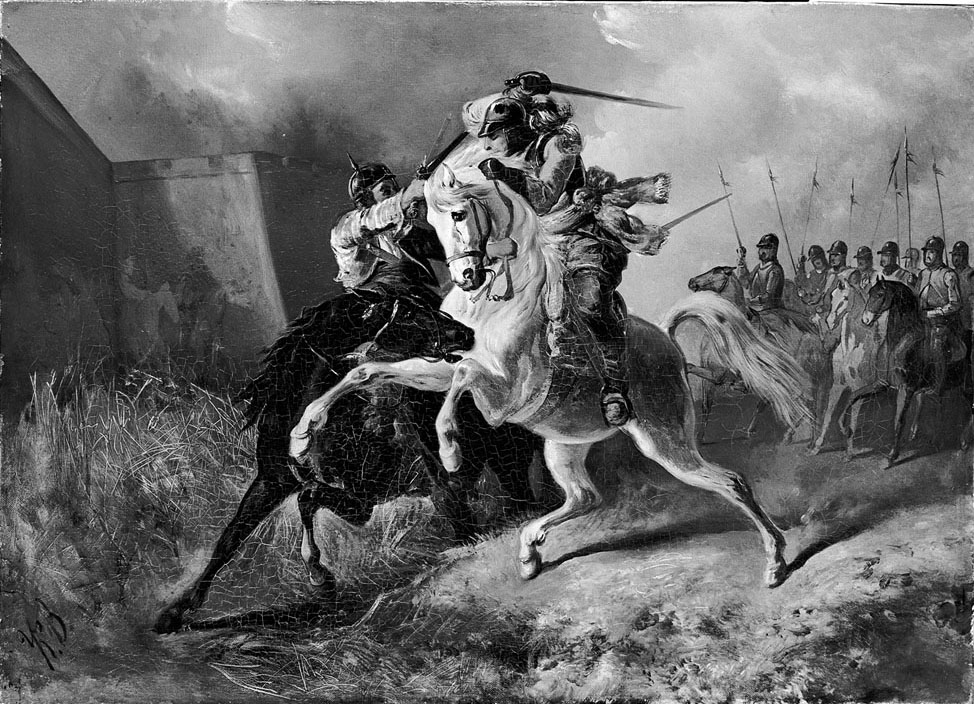
Duel between Rijhove and an Albanian warrior in Spanish service outside the walls of Deventer.

On 1 June the Anglo-Dutch force surrounded the town and began entrenching. Eight days later a breach was made and Maurice allowed the honour of the assault to be made by the English. As they attacked they came across a bridge of boats but found it was too short and were unable to advance any further and withdrew after some loss.

Maurice was desirous of giving up the siege for fears of a Spanish relief army. Vere induced him to persist and the same evening the Spanish garrison sallied to destroy the bridge but they were repulsed by the English pikemen.

On June 10 Van den Burgh having been wounded realised that no help was forthcoming, so he and the town capitulated - the garrison marched out on the following day.

== Aftermath ==
For the English the capture of both Zutphen and Deventer were important in recovering the losses caused by the mistaken confidence which the Earl of Leicester had placed in traitors William Stanley and Rowland York.

Maurice decided to strike at Groningen held by Francisco Verdugo, but reports reached him that the Duke of Parma was preparing to move to reinforce that place with 20,000 men. Maurice realising he would be outnumbered withdrew to the north and marched to Delfzijl and took the place July 2.
