= Siege of Zutphen (1591) =

1591 siege

- Part of the Eighty Years' War & the Anglo–Spanish War & Maurice's campaign of 1591
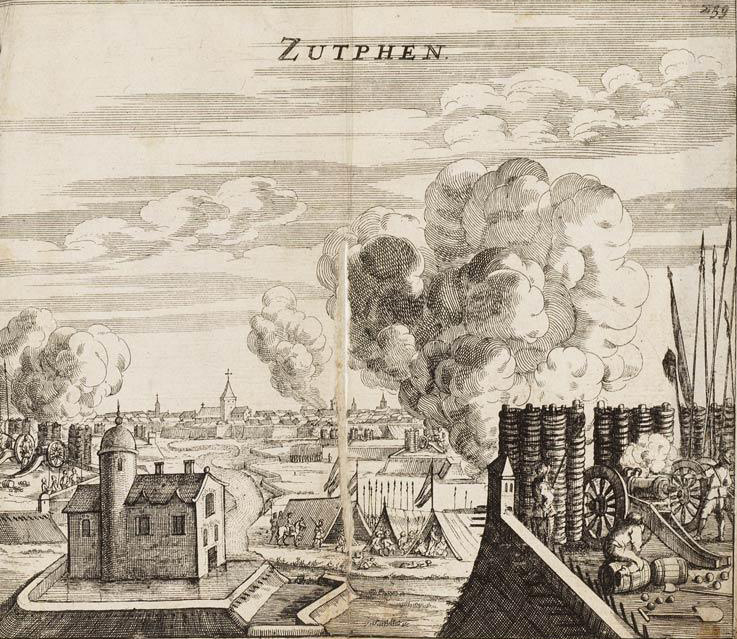
- The Capture of Zutphen in 1591 - print by Jan Janssonius
Date	19 to 30 May 1591
Location	Zutphen, Guelders (present-day the Netherlands) 52°08′24″N 6°11′42″E
Result	Anglo-Dutch victory

Belligerents
Dutch Republic; England	(Spain) Spanish Empire

Commanders and leaders
(Dutch Republic) Maurice of Orange (England) Francis Vere	(Spain) Jarich van Liauckema

Strength
9,000 soldiers 1,600 cavalry	1,000 (Spanish and Walloons)

Casualties and losses
Light	Most captured
- Location within Netherlands Siege of Zutphen (1591) (North Sea)

The siege of Zutphen was an eleven-day siege of the city of Zutphen by Dutch and English troops led by Maurice of Nassau, during the Eighty Years' War and the Anglo–Spanish War. The siege began on 19 May 1591 after a clever ruse by the besiegers. The city was then besieged for eleven days, after which the Spanish garrison surrendered.

== Background ==
Zutphen was a Hanseatic city on the east bank of the River IJssel. In 1572, with the resurgence of the Dutch rebellion against Philip II of Spain, Zutphen was first conquered by State troops led by Willem IV van den Bergh. The city was later recaptured by the Spaniards led by Don Frederick, and the population was punished and then slaughtered for the surrender earlier that year.

In 1586, the English under the Earl of Leicester took Zutphen's important outlying sconce, but soon English turncoat Rowland York handed the sconce over to the Spaniards, leaving Zutphen in their complete control. York died there of smallpox a year later, although he may have been poisoned by the Spanish to keep him from betraying again. As a consequence, William Stanley handed over the nearby town of Deventer to the Spaniards.

In 1590, Maurice had taken Breda by hiding soldiers within a peat barge and was thus able to use Breda as a base for further operations. The Dutch army could then launch an offensive at three points: to the South, to the East, and to the North. Maurice headed towards Nijmegen to the East along the River IJssel.

By the beginning of 1591, Maurice's first goal was to take back Zutphen. With the parallel waterways, he could then move the troops and artillery as quickly as possible and also keep the Spanish from reinforcing the besieged towns. The garrison of Zutphen itself consisted of nearly 1,000 Spaniards and Walloons, and on the west bank of the river lay the important sconce.

== Siege ==
Maurice's army consisted of 9000 soldiers and 1600 horsemen which marched to Zutphen, along with 100 ships. The rapid march in five days meant that Maurice could then prepare his artillery, which was stored on the ships; a far easier method of transportation than trying to haul them overland over boggy ground.

In order to take Zutphen, the sconce on the west bank had to be taken, as it controlled the main bridge to the town. Once this had been taken, the town could be besieged proper once all the heavy guns from the barges had disembarked.

Maurice hoped to use another ruse similar to the one he had used at Breda with the peat barge. Francis Vere, in charge of the English troops, wanted the 'dirt' removed from the 1587 treachery and thus wanted to lead the assault. Vere got his wish and Maurice ordered him to take the sconce on the Veluwe opposite Zutphen by sending no more than a dozen men and disguise them as farmers, some even dressed as women. It was hoped that the Spanish would think they were refugees escaping the Dutch army and would let them in. Once the sconce was captured Zutphen would have no hope of holding out.

Vere led the English troops to Doesburg and set the plan in motion. The disguised soldiers ran towards the fort, "pursued" by a fake cavalry charge. The garrison opened the gates and let the disguised soldiers in; the English then went as far as selling the guards butter, cheese, and eggs. When the order was given the English cut down the guard quickly enough to allow the Dutch cavalry to rush in, followed by the rest of the troops as they had been hidden by a large mound nearby. Soon the Anglo–Dutch force overpowered the Spanish and turned the guns on Zutphen.

After this successful strategy, having secured the bridge and further reinforced by Count William Louis' Frisian companies, Maurice began the actual assault. The Dutch gunners then brought thirty artillery pieces up to three points, in case the garrison tried to retake the town, and then opened fire. The Spanish garrison soon saw that any further resistance was now futile and surrendered to the besiegers.

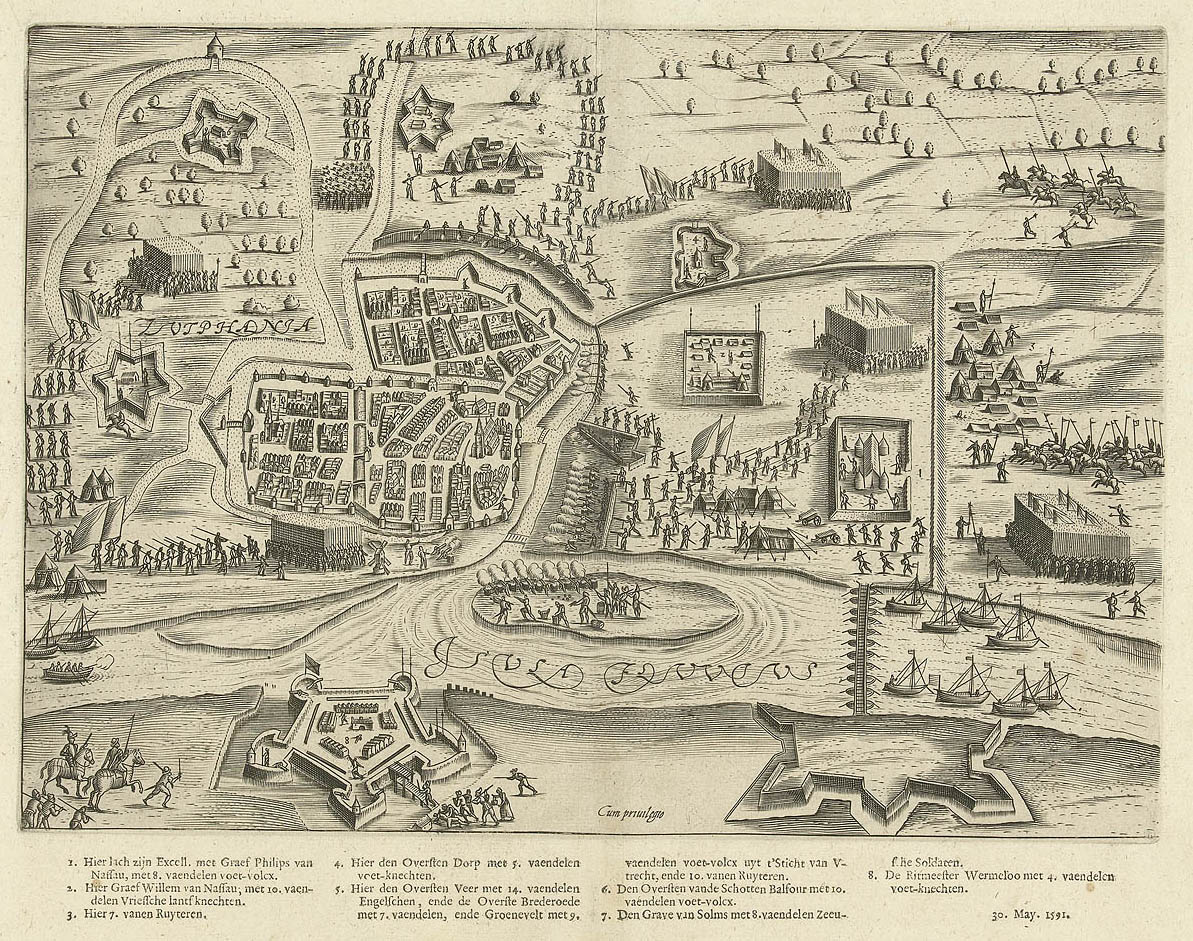
Siege of Zutphen in 1591 by Bartholomeus Dolendo - The English are attacking the sconce at top of picture

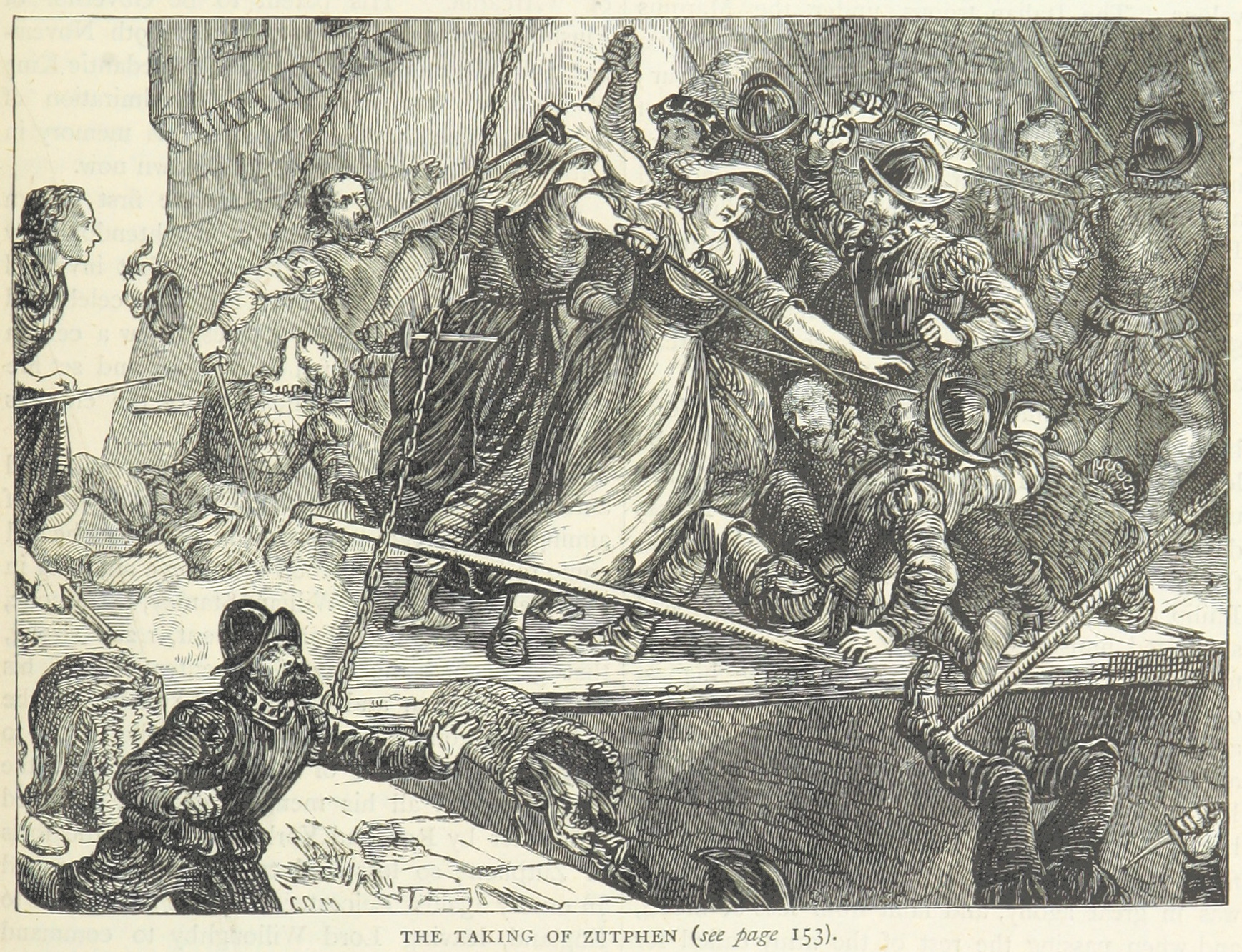
The disguised English soldiers take the sconce, from a Victorian book

== Aftermath ==
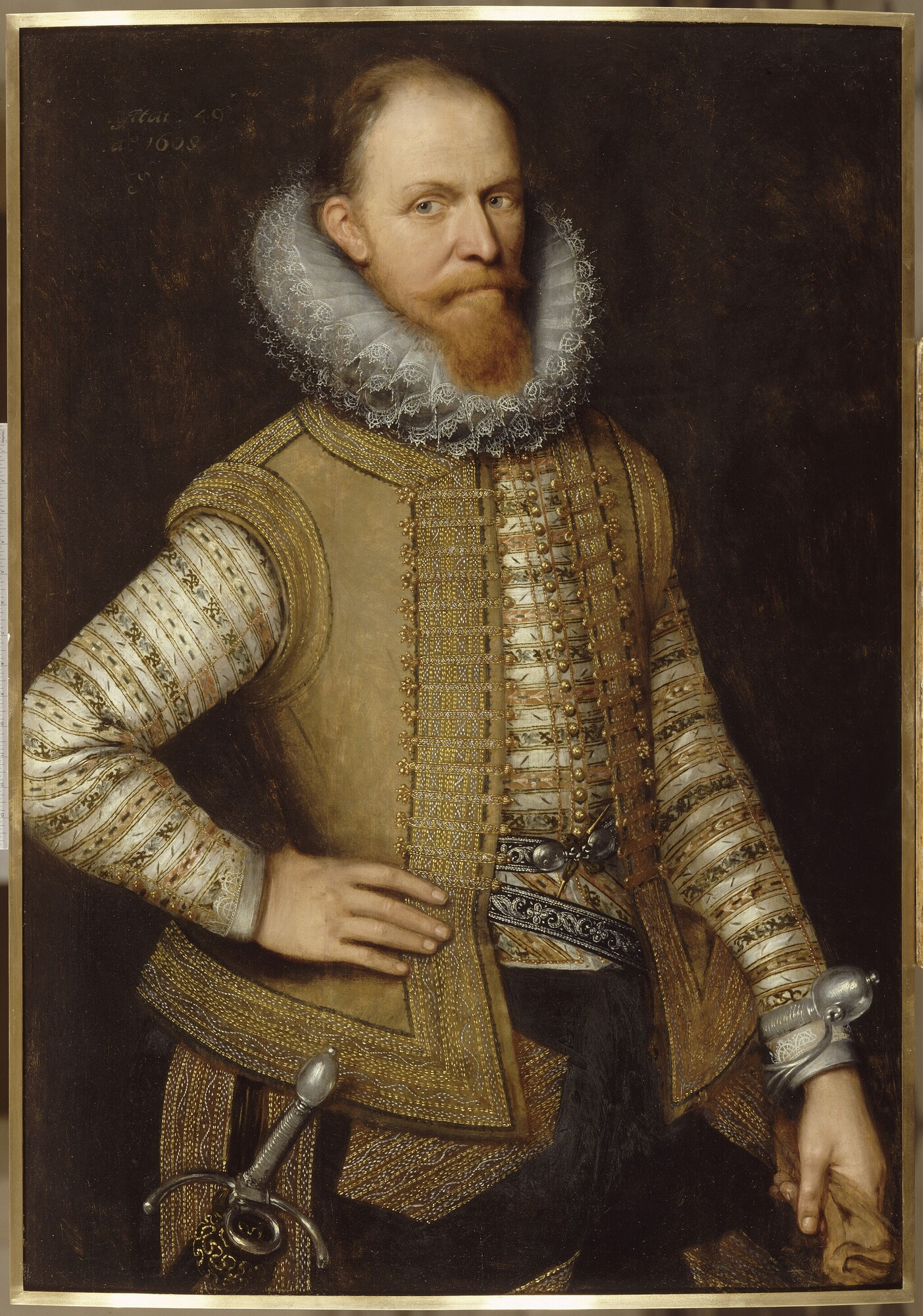
Maurice of Nassau

The town which had so eluded the Dutch was now firmly in their hands, while the Spanish had lost an important town. The terms of surrender were light: the garrison was allowed to retreat, the citizens were allowed three days to either depart or swear allegiance to the Dutch Republic. After setting up a strong garrison in Zutphen, Maurice marched north with his army, his artillery and munitions being sent down the IJssel in barges. His next target would be Deventer.

Vere was nicknamed 'the fox' after his successful ruse employed during the siege; he dug up the body of Rowland York and hanged and gibbeted it as a reminder of York's treachery. Zutphen would remain in Dutch hands for the rest of the war.

== See also ==
- Battle of Zutphen
- List of stadtholders in the Low Countries
- List of governors of the Spanish Netherlands

== Bibliography ==
- Henty, G. A. (2004). By England's Aid: Or the Freeing of the Netherlands (1585-1604). Kessinger Publishing. ISBN 9781419111372.
- Honan, Park (2005). Christopher Marlowe:Poet & Spy. Oxford University Press. ISBN 9780191622793.
- MacCaffrey, Wallace T (1994). Elizabeth I: War and Politics, 1588-1603. Princeton University: Princeton Paperbacks. ISBN 9780691036519.
- Markham, Clement (2007). The Fighting Veres: Lives Of Sir Francis Vere And Sir Horace Vere. Kessinger Publishing. ISBN 978-1432549053.
- Lothrop Motley, John (2006). The Rise of the Dutch Republic, Entire 1566–74. Hard Press. ISBN 978-1406952162.
- van Nimwegen, Olaf (2010). The Dutch Army and the Military Revolutions, 1588-1688 Volume 31 of Warfare in History Series. Boydell & Brewer. ISBN 9781843835752.
- Randall, David (2011). "Netherlands Expedition". Encyclopaedia of Tudor England. Santa Barbara, California: ABC-CLIO. pp. 790–791. ISBN 9781598842982.
- Robinson, Paul (2006). Military Honour and the Conduct of War: From Ancient Greece to Iraq. Cass Military Studies, Routledge. ISBN 9780203969632.
- Rowse A. L. (2006). Expansion of Elizabethan England. University of Wisconsin Press. ISBN 978-0299188245.
- Cañete, Hugo A (2015). La Guerra de Frisia. Malaga: Ediciones Platea. ISBN 9788494288432.
