= Francis Vere =

English army officer and politician (1560–1609)

Sir Francis Vere
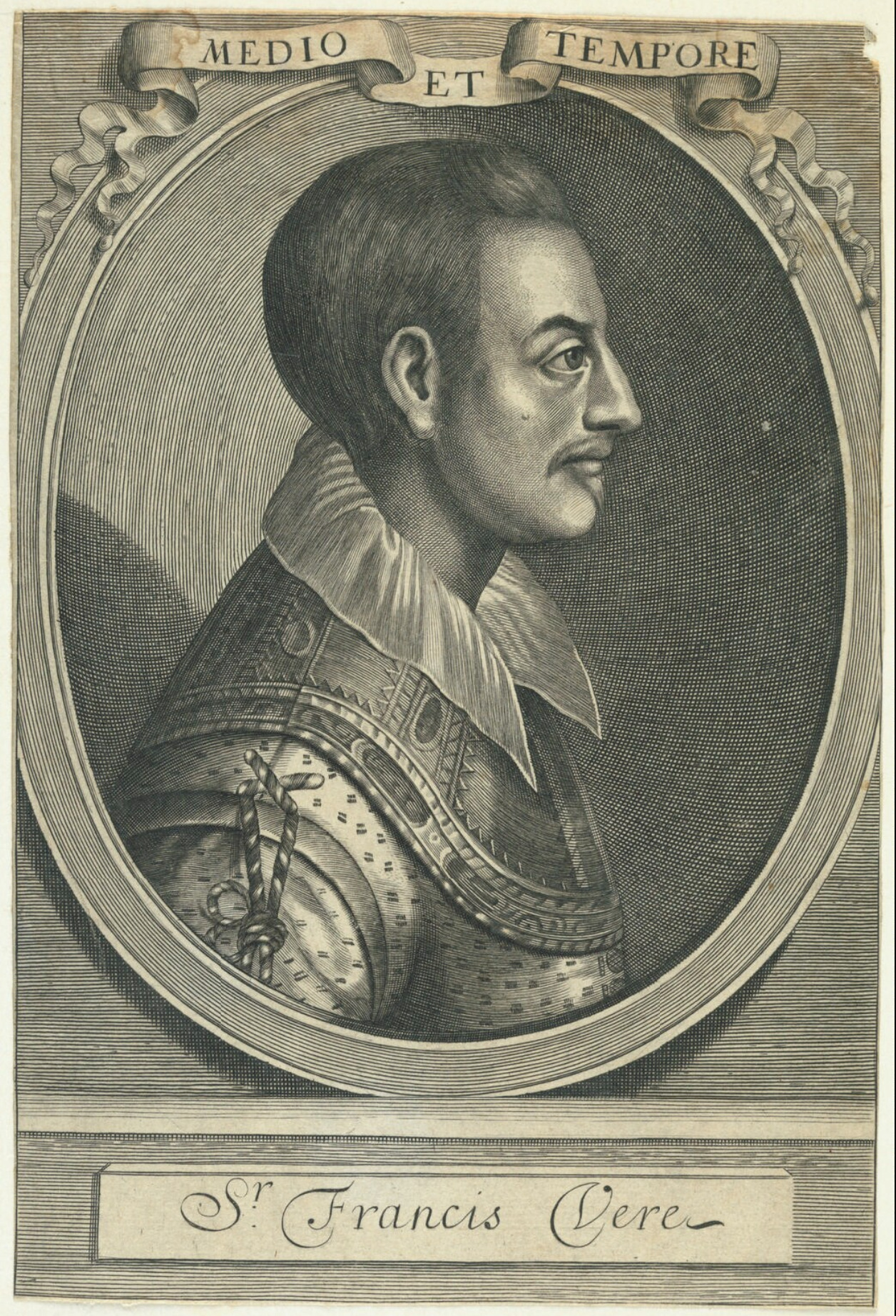
- Portrait by William Faithorne, c. 1657
- Born: c. 1560
- Died: 28 August 1609 (aged 48–49)
- Burial place: Westminster Abbey
- Spouse: Elizabeth Dent
- Parents: Geoffrey Vere (father); Elizabeth Hardekyn (mother)

Sergeant Major General Sir Francis Vere (c. 1560 – 28 August 1609) was an English army officer and politician who served during the reign of Elizabeth I and fought mainly in the Low Countries during the Anglo-Spanish War of 1585–1604 and the Eighty Years' War. Vere was promoted to commander of English and Scottish troops in the Low Countries in 1589, a position he retained during fifteen campaigns against the Spanish with almost unbroken success, most notably at the Battle of Nieuwpoort. Enjoying excellent relations with the Dutch under Maurice of Nassau, Vere worked in close co-operation with them to help secure their independence from Spain.

== Family and parliament ==
Francis Vere, born about 1560, was the second son of Geoffrey Vere of Crepping Hall, Essex, a younger son of John de Vere, 15th Earl of Oxford, and Elizabeth Trussell. His mother was Elizabeth Hardekyn (d. December 1615), daughter of Richard Hardekyn (d.1558) of Wotton House near Castle Hedingham. He had three brothers, John Vere (c. 1558 – 1624) of Kirby Hall near Castle Hedingham, Robert Vere (b. 1562), and Sir Horatio Vere (b. 1565), and a sister, Frances Vere (born 1567), who married, as his second wife, the colonial adventurer and author Sir Robert Harcourt (1574/5–1631), of Nuneham on 20 March 1598.

He was elected Member of Parliament for Leominster in 1593.

Vere spent a great deal of time visiting his friend, Sir Julius Caesar in Mitcham in Surrey, on the road from London to Nonsuch Palace. Caesar was on his second marriage to Alice Dent and she had a daughter from a previous marriage – Elizabeth Dent. During these visits he quickly became enamoured with Elizabeth. They fell in love and Caesar consented to a marriage. Since Elizabeth's sister was also engaged, Caesar arranged a grand wedding for his stepdaughters on 26 October 1607. Vere received a dowry of £2,000 and settled property on her for life. She was 16 and he was 47. They were married for 22 months before his death and there is no record of any children.

== Military career ==
The young Francis Vere first went on active service under Leicester in 1585, and was soon in the thick of the war raging in the Low Countries. At the siege of Sluys he greatly distinguished himself under Sir Roger Williams and Sir Thomas Baskerville.

In 1588 during the Spanish Armada Vere was sent to Vlissingen with 260 men to preempt a Spanish landing. During the action off Calais in August he was responsible for the destruction of the Spanish galleon San Mateo which had run aground between Ostend and Sluis. After this he was then with the largely English garrison of Bergen op Zoom, which delivered itself from the Spanish besiegers led by the Duke of Parma by its own good fighting. Vere as a result of his heroic deeds was Knighted by Lord Willoughby on the field of battle.

=== Ten Years campaign ===
In the next year Sir Francis became sergeant major-general of the English and Scottish troops in the Low Countries, and soon afterwards the chief command devolved upon him. He was prominent in the campaign known as the Ten years, spanning from 1588 to 1598 with the Dutch forces under Maurice of Nassau. After assisting in taking Breda he then retook the cities of Zutphen and Deventer, these having been lost five years earlier due to English treachery by Rowland York and William Stanley respectively. He ordered that York (who had died in 1588) be dug up, hanged and gibbeted as a reminder of his treachery. These victories were important in recovering the losses caused by the mistaken confidence which the Earl of Leicester had placed in both Stanley and York.

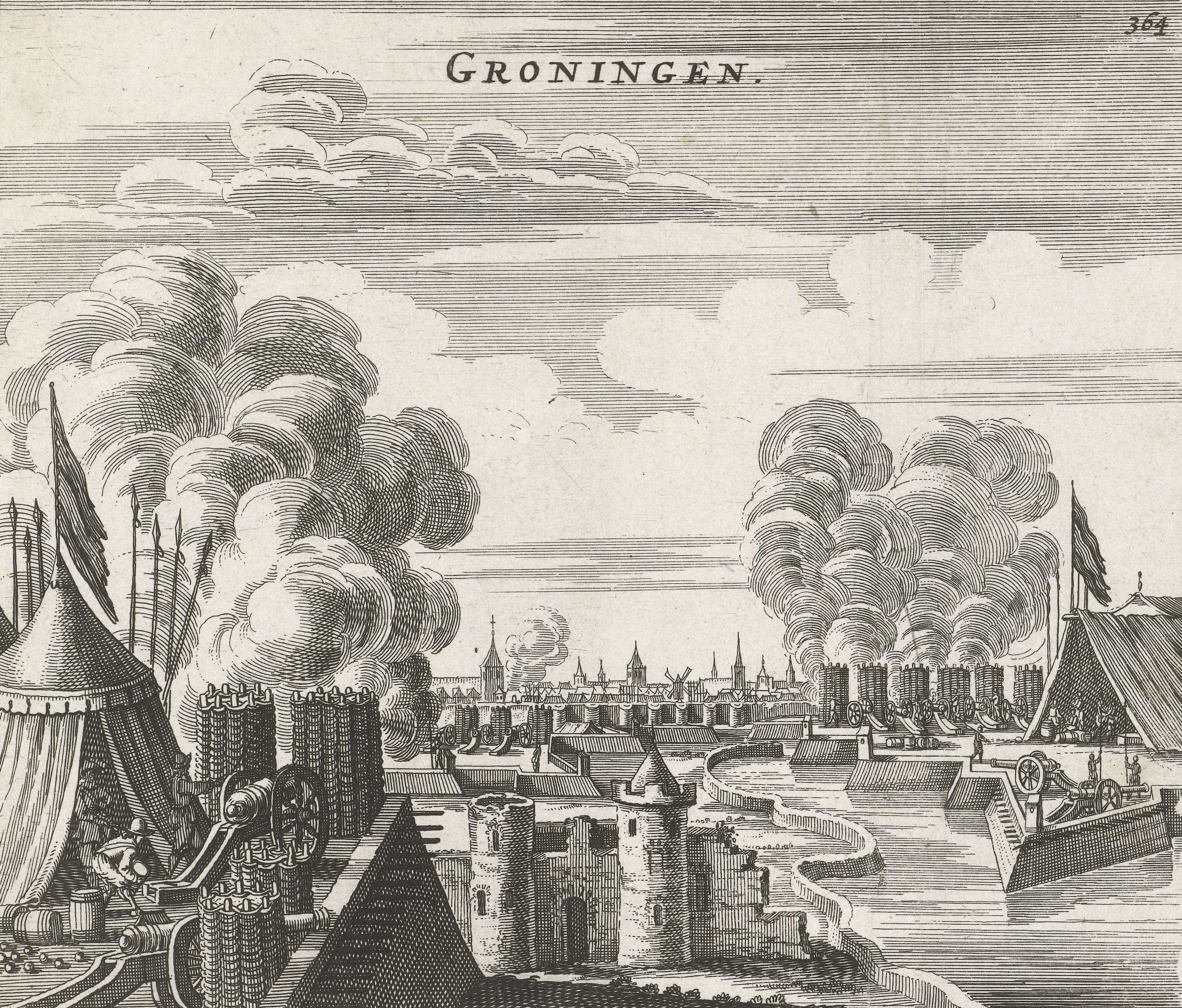
The siege of Groningen in 1594

Vere garnered more rewards and respect from Maurice and the Dutch with his decisive actions in the defeat of Parma, this time during the Siege of Knodsenburg outside Nijmegen in July 1591. Nearly half of the army were English and Scots; twelve English and ten Scots companies were present in this campaign under the command of Vere. Following this Maurice and Vere seized Hulst the same year. At the Siege of Steenwijk in the summer of 1592 Vere lead a force into a breach of the city's wall after a mine has blown - although he along with his brother Horace, Sir Robert Sidney, and a few of their captains were wounded, along with 152 of their men during the assault, the attack was successful and the Spanish surrendered the town. The Anglo-Dutch army then marched to Coevorden and which fell after another successful siege. The city of Geertruidenberg fell the following year, and a Spanish attempt to retake Coevorden was defeated after Vere and Maurice when they marched to the city's relief. They both took to the field again in 1594 and laid siege to Groningen, which was also captured. By this time the Spanish army had been all but pushed out of the Northern provinces and the restoration of the seven provinces was then complete. Step by step these victories helped to secure the country for the cause of independence.

During his career, Vere was widely regarded by the public as a highly skilled English soldier, also being a leading military figure from his experience and skills. His troops acquired a cohesion and a training based on the Dutch model fitting them to face the Spanish troops, and his camp became the training-ground for English soldiers, including his younger brother Horace, Ferdinando (Lord) Fairfax, Gervase Markham and Captain Myles Standish. The dramatist and poet Ben Jonson served as a volunteer under his command.

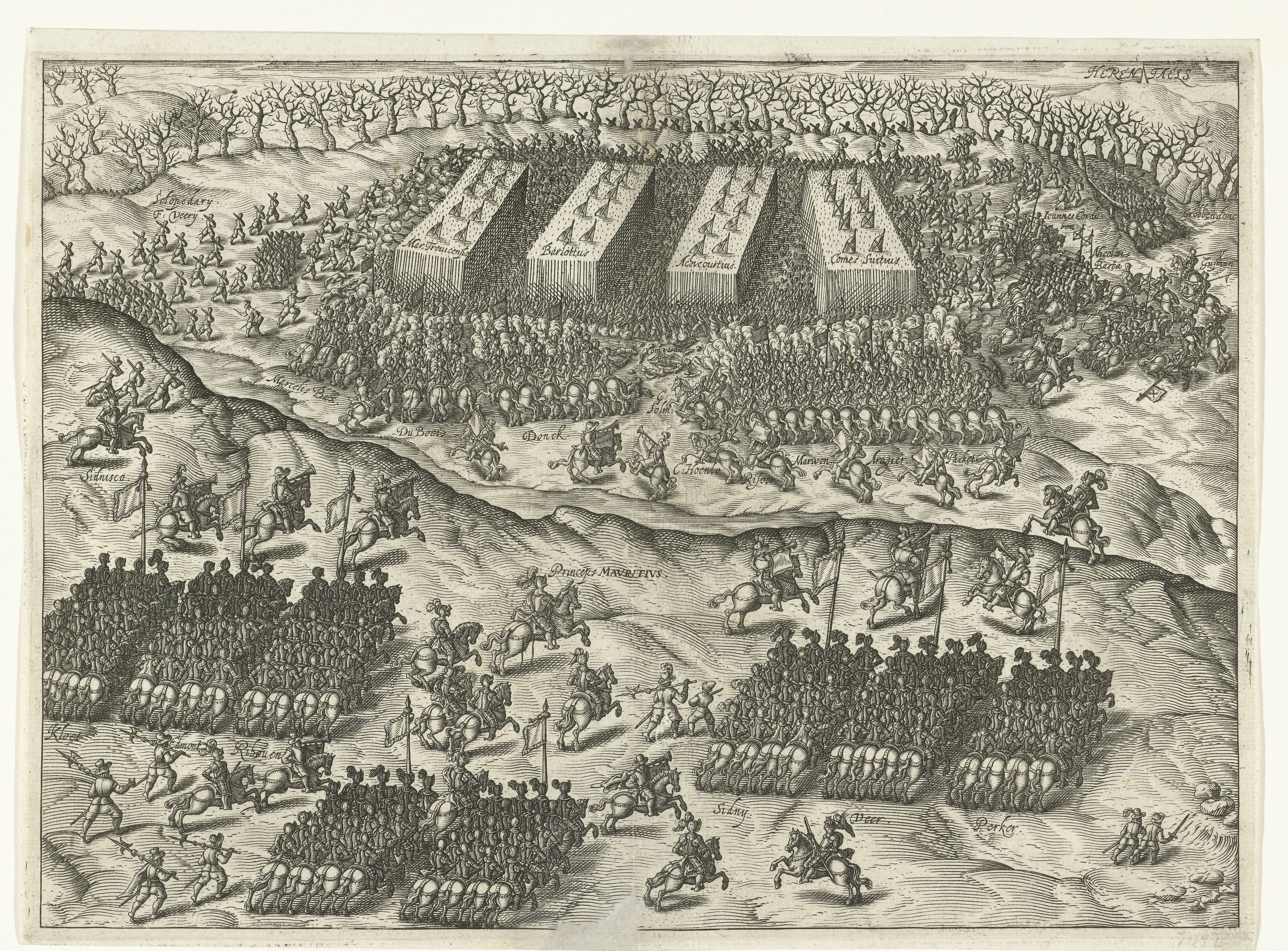
Battle of Turnhout - 1597. English cavalry led by Vere shown on bottom right

In early 1596 he was transferred from the field to take part in the Cádiz expedition to Spain which was to take place in June. Vere and Sir Walter Raleigh quarrelled over leadership but it was agreed that Raleigh would command at sea and Vere was made lord marshal and lieutenant-general of the army. On June 30, Vere's veterans spearheaded the assault on the city and captured it and the outlying forts. The English and Dutch held the place for two weeks during that time Vere received the ransoms of three wealthy prisoners a clergyman who was president of the Casa de Contratacion at Seville and two cavaliers named Don Pedro de Herrera and Don Geronimo de Avalos. The town was then set on fire and the fleet departed on the 5th of July. Vere shared in a considerable amount of booty as well as the popular acclaim that greeted the leaders of the expedition on their return to England.

The following year he was back in the Low Countries and in January 1597 he made an important contribution to the victory of Turnhout, a rare pitched battle against the Spanish 'Tercios'. The English and Dutch cavalry having driven off the Spanish cavalry, then fell upon the disordered Spanish infantry who were then routed with heavy casualties. Vere received a personal note from the Queen congratulating him on the victory, and he was even dramatised in London on the stage. The following year he was entrusted with the negotiation of the treaty whereby the Anglo-Dutch alliance was revised; for himself he obtained the governorship of Brill and the rank of general.

=== Zaltbommel, Nieuwpoort and Ostend ===
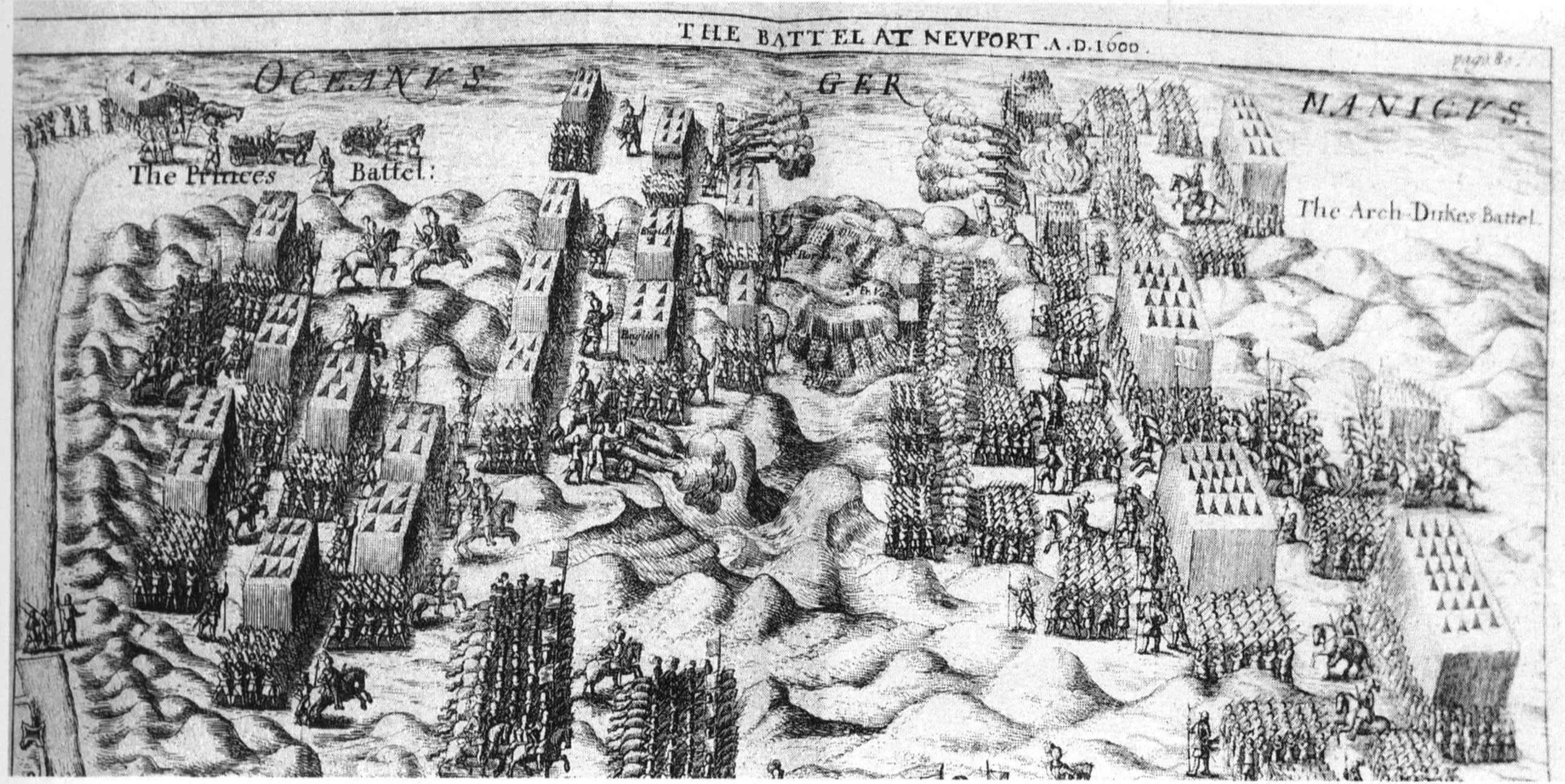
Battle of Nieuwpoort, 1600. From The commentaries of Sr. Francis Vere

In May 1599 a Spanish offensive led by Francisco López de Mendoza y Mendoza was launched in the area of Bommelerwaard. A subsequent siege on the town of Zaltbommel by the Spanish was attempted but they had to lift the siege after Vere crossed the river Waal with 6,000 men, and successfully stormed a Spanish position which they called Durango. The Spanish were on the verge of being totally cut off and were defeated in subsequent attempts to regain the initiative. Mendoza retreated and the Spanish army then found itself in chaos: mutinies took effect and as a result further operations by them were suspended for a number of years.

The culminating point of Vere's career came the following year, when on the advice of Oldenbarnevelt, the States General decided to carry the war into the enemy's country. In the Battle of Nieuwpoort (2 July 1600), one of the most desperately contested battles of the age, Maurice of Nassau, with support by Vere, defeated the veteran Spanish troops of the Archduke Albert.

This was followed by the celebrated defence of Ostend from July 1601 when he took command of the garrison. The Spanish were under the command of the Archduke Albrecht. He was severely wounded in the head during a Spanish bombardment in August but returned by the end of the following month after convalescing. In December a Spanish assault on the outlying positions was defeated with nearly a quarter of the attacking force killed wounded or captured. However as the siege dragged on it became apparent that the town was unable to get any reinforcements for some time.

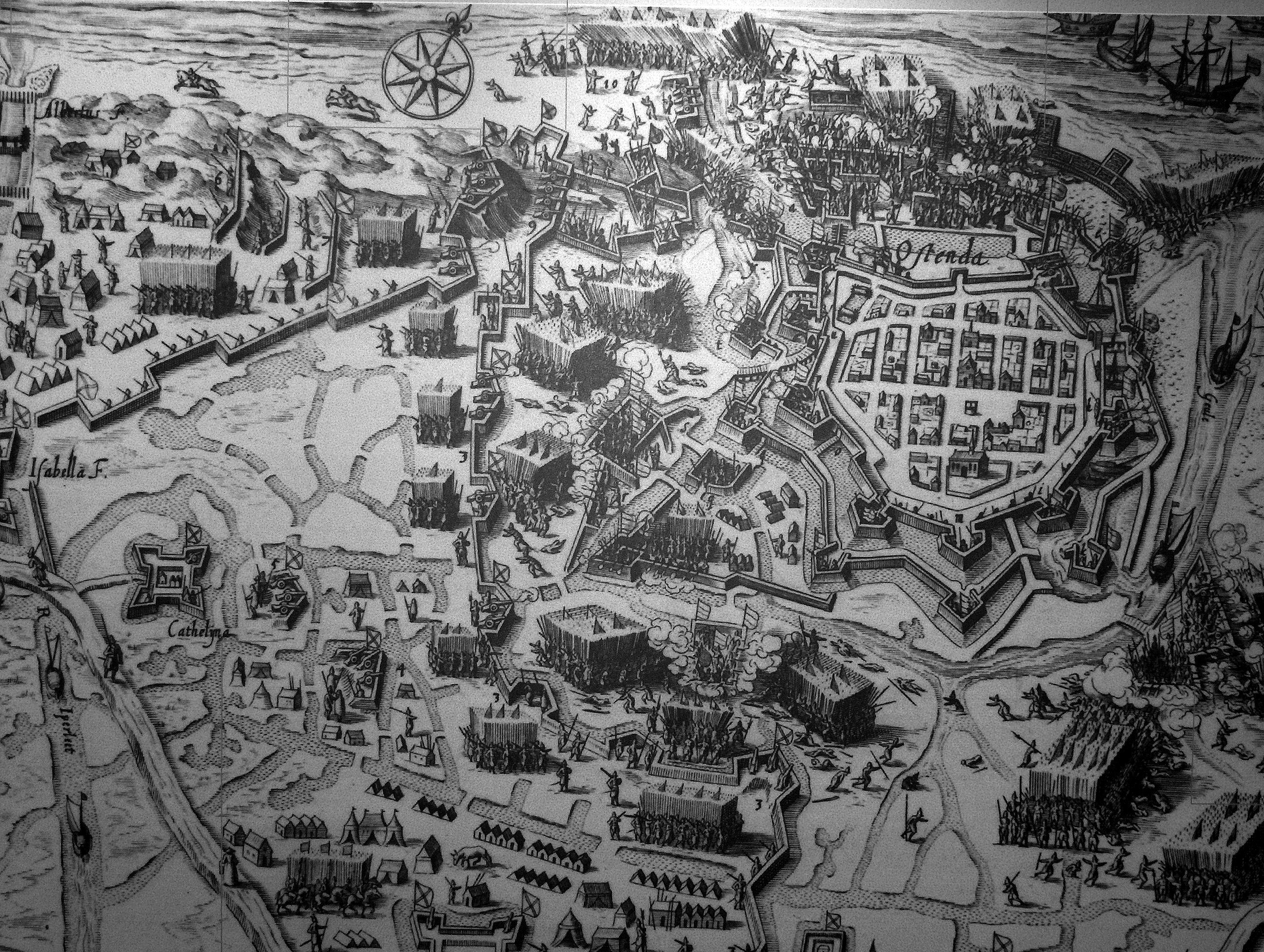
Siege of Ostend - depiction showing the repulse of the huge Spanish assault of 7 January 1602

After learning of a Spanish attempt to launch a huge assault - Vere had to rely on a parley stratagem to keep the Spanish from doing so. This he succeeded and at the same time vital repair work was carried out on the defences. During the ruse reinforcements came in and the parley was called off. Vere's plan had worked and when the Spanish assault came on 7 January 1602 the defenders were ready. The attack consisting of some 10,000 Spanish veterans rushed to assault the main bulwarks of Ostend's defences just as the darkness of night set in. Vere directing the defenders made sure the defences were impassable - using his engineers to shore up defences. The Spanish attacked the bulwarks and revelins but were repelled at all points. Just before midnight the Spanish had seized a position known as the Spanish Half Moon but Vere ordered its recovery and an English company subsequently drove the Spanish out who lost 300 men, mostly captured. Vere now ordered a defensive sluice to be opened, through which the water rushed down the ford where the Spanish were still wading across. The huge torrent then hit them and carried many of the assailants away into the sea. Once the waters had subsided Vere ordered a counter attack which drove what was left of the Spanish assailants away taking great plunder in the process. The assault was a costly failure for the Spanish who lost somewhere between 1,500 and 2,000 men.

Vere remained for a few months longer, when he was called away by the States General to assume command in the field. Vere's parley in December was met with muted criticism, however the repulse of the assault had overshadowed this. Vere came back to England in March 1602 and was feted for the successful conduct of the siege. English troops kept fighting side by side with the Dutch until the surrender of the garrison in September 1604.

=== Final campaign and retirement ===
Vere returned to the Low Countries with more troops in 1602 and with Maurice laid siege to the Spanish garrison at Grave but before that place surrendered he was injured under the right eye. He recovered after six months in Ryswick, was again on active service with the Dutch throughout 1603-04 and continued with the governorship of Brill.

When James I made peace with Spain in 1604, Vere retired from active service and spent the remainder of his days in country life in England, occupying himself with the compilation of his Commentaries of the Divers Pieces of Service that he had taken part in (which remained in manuscript form until 1657; reprinted in Arbers English Garner, 1883).

== Death and burial ==
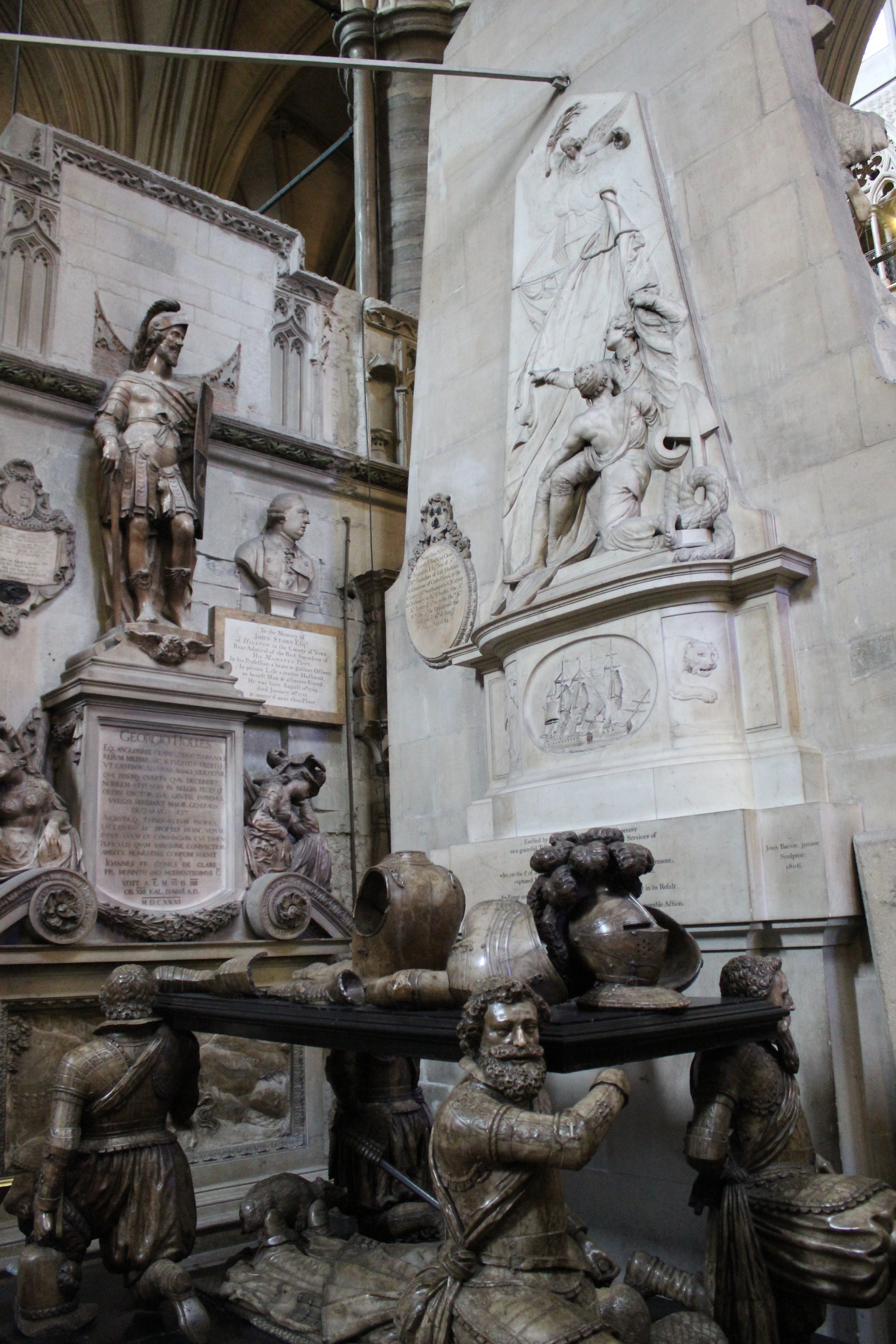
Sir Francis Vere's tomb monument in the Chapel of St John the Evangelist in Westminster Abbey, circa 1860

He died 28 August 1609—soon after the signing of the Twelve Years' Truce which in practice recognized the independence of the United Provinces—and was buried in Westminster Abbey in the chapel of St John the Evangelist. Francis has a large monument of alabaster and black marble showing him lying on a carved rush mattress in civilian dress under a slab on which is laid out his suit of armour. The slab is supported on the shoulders of four life-sized knights in armour who kneel at each corner. The monument seems to have been inspired by that of Count Engelbert II of Nassau-Dillenburg in the church at Breda. The Latin inscription can be translated:

To Francis Vere, Knight, son of Geoffrey and nephew of John earl of Oxford, governor of Brill and Portsmouth, chief leader of the English forces in Belgium, died 28 August 1609, in the 54th year (sic) of his age. Elizabeth, his wife, in great sadness and sobbing with tears, placed this supreme monument to conjugal faith and love.
