= Chéreau =

Chéreau is a French surname. Notable people with the surname include:

- Fabien Chéreau (born 1980), French research engineer and computer programmer
- François Chéreau (1680–1729), French engraver of portraits
- Jacques Chéreau (1688–1776), French portrait engraver and printmaker
- Jean-Luc Chéreau (born 1948), French former racing driver
- Patrice Chéreau (1944–2013), French stage director and filmmaker
