= Portrait of Louis XIV =

1701 painting by Hyacinthe Rigaud

- Portrait de Louis XIV en costume de sacre (French)
- Artist: Hyacinthe Rigaud
- Year: 1701
- Medium: oil on canvas
- Dimensions: 277 cm × 194 cm (109 in × 76 in)
- Location: Louvre, Paris
- Accession: INV 7492

Portrait of Louis XIV in Coronation Robes is an oil on canvas painting by the French painter Hyacinthe Rigaud, from 1701. It was made after the artist was commissioned by the king who wanted to satisfy the desire of his grandson, Philip V of Spain, to have a portrait of him. Louis XIV liked it so much that he decided to keep it, at Versailles. It has since become the most recognisable portrait of the king.

== Context ==
On the death of King Charles II of Spain on 18 November 1700, Spain was beset by the dynastic ambitions of other European powers, resulting in a succession war. The Spanish king's will ruled out any idea of sharing and placed Philip, Duke of Anjou, second son of the Grand Dauphin and grand-son of Louis XIV at the forefront of legitimate contenders for the crown. The future king of Spain, eager to take with him the image of his grandfather, convinced Louis XIV to order Hyacinthe Rigaud to paint what would become the absolute image of royal power and the reference picture for generations to come:

His reputation [Rigaud's] having reached the king, because of the portrait he had done of the Grand Dauphin as commander at the siege of Philippsburg, he had the honor in 1700, to be appointed by His Majesty to paint Philip V, king of Spain, his grandson, a few days before his departure to take possession of his kingdom. This work inspired the king of Spain's request to the king, his grandfather, to give him his portrait painted by the same hand, which His Majesty granted him. Rigaud had the honor to start the following year; and when it was finished, the monarch found the resemblance so perfect and so beautifully decorated, he ordered Rigaud to make a copy of the same size, to send to the king of Spain, instead of the original. His Most Christian Majesty is painted standing, clad in his royal apparel. This picture is ten and a half feet high; it is located in Versailles, in the throne room, and the picture of the king of Spain is in the private room of His Majesty.

Such were the statements of Hyacinthe Rigaud, through a friend, in the autobiography he sent to the Grand Duke of Tuscany Cosimo III in 1716. These statements are corroborated by the mention of the corresponding payment in the books of accounts of the artist, in 1701: "The King and the King of Spain, and a copy of King's portrait of the same size as the original for his Catholic Majesty, in all 12,000 pounds ", the price of three pictures. The same payment is charged to the royal buildings accounts on September 16, 1702: "Two large portraits of the King full-length, with the small sketch for the said portraits, as well as one for the full-length portrait of the king of Spain."

== Genesis ==
It seems that Philip V had obtained satisfaction through the intercession of Madame de Maintenon, who in a letter to the Duke of Noailles, dated March 11, 1701 wrote:

"I am working to send him the portrait which he has ordered me to make him do. Here are two after-dinners that I return from Saint-Cyr to oblige the King to be painted. Gout came to our rescue. Without it we will not have held him for three or four hours"

The day before, the Marquis de Dangeau left in his journal testimony corroborating the statements of Mme de Maintenon, describing the beginning of the Louis XIV painting, painted in privacy and designed to be embedded later into the final composition:

"Thursday 10 [March 1701] at Versailles – The King's gout continues, he was painted after dinner by Rigaud to send his portrait to the King of Spain to whom he promised him [...]. "The next day, the work actually continued:" Friday 11 at Versailles – The King's gout grew a little, and on leaving the sermon, where he was carried, he was carried back to Madame de Maintenon's, where Rigaud worked on his portrait.."

On September 3, 1703, in a touching letter he wrote to the Marquise, Philip V in turn confessed:

"Thank you for the care you took to get me the portrait of the king, I look forward..."

The size and complexity of the composition justified the expectations of the sponsors and the time spent by the artist to complete his work. All the evidence is that Rigaud painted from life while completing the portrait, which never did get sent to Spain.

Thursday, January 19, 1702, Rigaud is seeking a new session, wrote the Marquis de Dangeau:

"the King, who had no advice to keep, had the patience to be painted at Madame de Maintenon's by Rigaud; he sends this portrait to the King of Spain, who had urged on".

"The portrait of the King has been exhibited in the great apartment of Versailles; It is full with the royal habit. This work is by M. Rigaud. Never has a portrait been better painted, nor more resembling; The whole court saw it and everyone admired it. A work must be very beautiful and perfect to attract general applause in a place where good taste reigns and where one is not lavish of praise. His Majesty has promised his portrait to the King of Spain, wants to keep his word by giving him the original, and Mr. Rigaud must make a copy that is desired by the entire Court ."

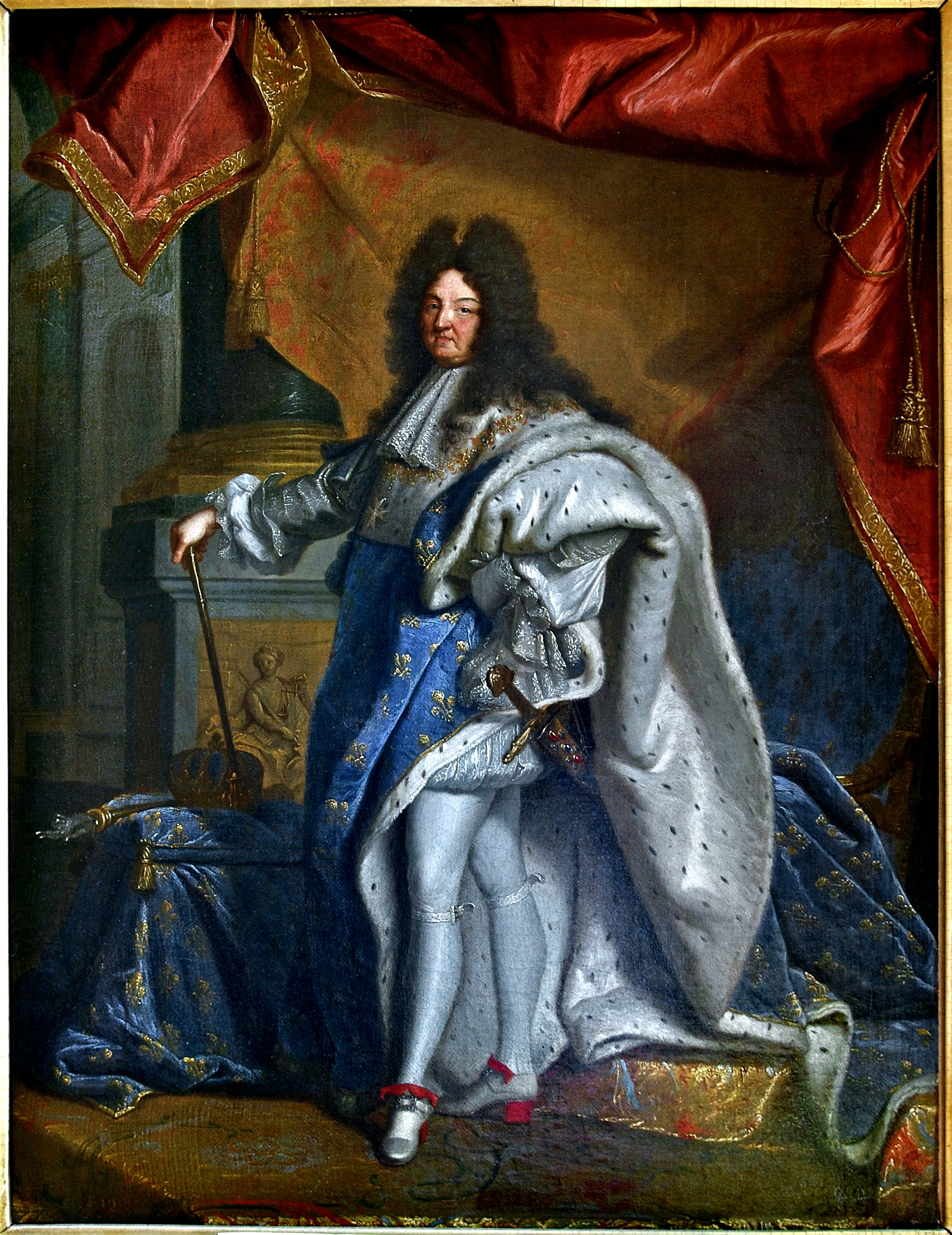
Louis XIV, King of France, study of Hyacinthe Rigaud from which he made Portrait of Louis XIV (1701) Musée Condé (Château de Chantilly)

The director of the King's Buildings ordered from the painter's studio a number of copies (in various forms for European courts or provincial royal dispensaries, such as that commissioned by François Stiémart, for example) or engravings, proved by a payment order dated September 16, 1702: "To Sieur Rigaud, ordinary painter of the King, for two large portraits of the King in full, with the sketch in small of the said portraits, as also of the full-length portrait of the King of Spain he made during the current year, 10,000 livres".

Pierre Drevet was appointed to carry out the engravings and receives "perfect payment of five thousand livres for the engraving [ sic ] he made of the portrait at the foot of the King Louis XIV, according to M. Rigaud, during 1714–1715." To do this, Drevet been assisted by a drawing executed by the young Jean-Marc Nattier and to who the director of buildings records payment, on August 20, 1713:

"to the Sr Nattier the young, painter, for the drawing of a portrait of the king after Rigaud, which he copied to serve as a model for engraving during 1713, [...] 500 livres"

Drevet owes a great deal to Nattier's work, which has recreated Rigaud's painting to its smallest details, to the projected dimensions of an etching. However, it extended the marble gallery in the background slightly, a variation followed by the engraver. There is no doubt that Rigaud himself supervised Nattier's work, since the drawing was intended for his friend Prevet, and Marc's father, Natier Mariette considers the work of Drevet as "what [the artist] has made more considerable" and that she " engraved by order of his very Christian Majesty and Estre put in his Cabinet." In 1733, he noted the rarity in a letter to Gabburri: "For my part I can encourage you to acquire a portrait of the reigning king and the queen, but the one engraved by Drevet is very difficult to have, and I have it Seen for sale at more than eight livres. I can have it for a discreet price but I have to give me time."

== Description ==
Signed and dated, "Painted by Hyacinthe Rigaud in 1701" on the base of the column supporting the goddess of Justice, and with Themis holding a set of scales in her hand, this portrait is that of an aging (62 years old) King.

Rigaud executed the face on a small rectangular canvas subsequently sewn in small dots onto a larger canvas painted with the figure and background. This original, now in the Louvre 3, from the crown collections, has a replica (now shown in the Apollo Room of the Palace of Versailles ), also signed although of slightly different dimensions than the original. One can also find a copy at the Hotel Negresco. The king is depicted standing upright, three quarters to the left, his head low and his feet in view, a pose calculated to presenting the greater part of his person. The king occupies the central space of the painting whose composition is constructed from vertical lines (column, king, throne) and a pyramid in which the sovereign inscribes, which creates an elevated space. The drama of the scene is accentuated by a heavy draped curtain which traditionally means that the king does not appear but appears. A large marble pillar, traditional evocation of power since the Renaissance (as a stability symbol, the world axis that unites the earthly and heavenly powers) holds the composition left. The massive barrel rests on a stylobate whose two visible sides are decorated with reliefs depicting two royal virtues: The allegories of Justice (front) and strength (left, very difficult to see).

Stood before a throne upholstered in blue and embroidered with fleur de lys placed high up on a platform and under a purple (the color of power and wealth since antiquity) silk canopy, the king embodies the majesty of choice because he need not bear regalia (he is uncrowned, the hand of justice posed on a stool covered with a blue fleur de lys drapery, scepter of his grandfather Henry IV held upside down as a cane), except to the sword of Charlemagne whose sole custody is visible. Wearing this sword with the coronation mantle is an obvious incongruity. The monarch is clothed in a leonine wig and court garments ( lace shirt and cuffs, brocade rhingraves, red - heeled shoes adorned with diamond buckles, and silk stockings held by garters ) wears the necklace of the Order of the Holy Spirit and the royal coat pinned high on the shoulder to highlight the former sword dancer and his thin legs as Louis XIV had insisted that his features be "true"

== See also ==
- 100 Great Paintings, 1980 BBC series

== Copies ==
A copy of this portrait, made by Pierre Legendre, is in the library of the Palais Rohan, Strasbourg, opposite the portrait of Louis XV, also in costume de sacre. Another copy is present at the Paris Observatory, between portraits of Giovanni Domenico Cassini and Urbain Le Verrier.

There's one copy at the J. Paul Getty Museum in LA and one at the Versailles Palace.

== Sources ==
- Charles-Philippe de Chennevières-Pointel, Louis Étienne Dussieux, Paul Mantz, Anatole de Montaiglon, Eudore Soulié, Mémoires inédits sur la vie et les ouvrages des membres de l’Académie royale de peinture et de sculpture, publiés d’après les manuscrits conservés à l’école impériale des beaux-arts, vol. II, Paris, Société de l'histoire de l'art français, 1854
- Antoine Joseph Dezallier d'Argenville, Abrégé de la vie des plus fameux peintres, avec leurs portraits gravés en taille-douce, les indications de leurs principaux ouvrages, Quelques réflexions sur leurs Caractères, et la manière de connoître les dessins des grands maîtres, vol. IV, Paris, De Bure, 1745
- Fernand Engerand, Inventaires des collections de la couronne. Inventaire des tableaux commandés et achetés par la direction des bâtiments du roi (1709–1792), vol. I, 1901, 463–464, 561, 620 p.
- Wolf Burchard, "Blinded by the Sun", Apollo (March 2015), pp. 160-164.
- Jules Guiffrey, Comptes des Bâtiments du Roi sous le règne de Louis XIV, 1664–1715, vol. V, Paris, 1881, 693, 697, 789, 876 p.
- Charles Maumené, Louis d'Harcourt, Iconographie des rois de France, vol. V, Paris, Colin, 1931, 91–95 p.
- Anatole de Montaiglon, Procès-verbaux de l’Académie Royale de Peinture et de Sculpture (1648–1793) publiés par Anatole de Montaiglon d’après les registres originaux conservés à l’École des Beaux-Arts de Paris, Paris, Société de l’Histoire de l’art français, 1875–1892
- Stéphan Perreau, Hyacinthe Rigaud (1659–1743), le peintre des rois, Montpellier, Nouvelles Presses du Languedoc, 2004
- Myriam Tsikounas, « De la gloire à l'émotion, Louis XIV en costume de sacre par Hyacinthe Rigaud. », Sociétés & Représentations, 2/2008 (no 26), p. 57–70
- Joseph Roman, Le livre de raison du peintre Hyacinthe Rigaud, Paris, Laurens, 1919
