= François Chéreau =

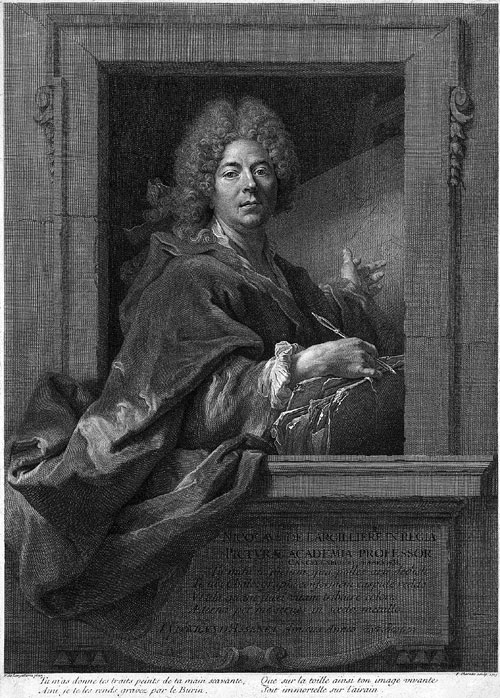
Portrait of the painter Nicolas de Largillière after his self-portrait

François Chéreau, also known as François I Chéreau (20 March 1680 in Blois, Orléanais – 16 April 1729 in Paris) was an engraver of portraits and reproductions of famous works of art during the reign of Louis XIV.

== Early life ==
He was the first son of carpenter Simon Chéreau and his wife Anne Hardouin whose second son, Jacques Chéreau also became an engraver. François I moved to Paris and studied with Gérard Audran and Pierre Drevet. From 1712 to 1713 he did business from the Rue du Foin, in the Parish of Saint Séverin. In 1714, François I Chéreau married 1714 Margueritte Caillou of a mercantile family from Houdan and Paris, with whom he had ten children. Their eldest child, François II Chéreau, was born in 1717.

== Engraver to the King ==
In 1718 François I received the title of "engraver to the cabinet du roi" and was accepted by the Royal Academy of Painting and Sculpture, after presenting a portrait of the young Louis de Boullongue. Subsequently, François I appended the designation "avec priv. du Roy" ("with the King's privilege") to his prints. Prints made for the cabinet of the king were exchanged and exhibited by the king as well as being sold at Chéreau's shop.

Also in 1718, after the death of Audran's widow, Hélène Licherie, François I Chéreau bought "Les Deux Piliers d'Or," collectively the business, premises, presses, supplies and fonds, and put his name on Audran's "Two Pillars of Gold" sign in the Rue des Malthurins Saint Jacques, also known as "Rue Saint-Mathurin Jacques." He began selling part of the Audran catalog of prints as well as his own work. Audren's print catalog was published four times after Audran's own pre-1703 imprint: in 1718 by his widow Hélène Licherie, in 1742 and 1757 by the widow of François I Chéreau, in 1770 by François I's grandson, Jacques-François Chéreau (b 14 October 1742 - d 16 May 1794, son of Francois II Chéreau & Geneviève Marguerite Chéreau and grandson of both François I and his brother Jacques).

Their last child, Marie-Edméc Chéreau, was born after François I Chéreau's death on 16 April 1729. At that time, Margueritte was known as Madame le Veuve Chéreau (literally, "Widow Chéreau") and continued to run François I's print business with her son François II Chéreau (1717–1755) until her own death on 17 April 1755. Also on the premises was confusingly an engraver and printseller at the same address, Louise Pierrette Charpentier, who after the death her own husband, Jacques Simon I Chéreau (b. 16 October 1732 - pre 1760) became another "Widow Chéreau."

== Legacy ==
The inventory of the business after Margueritte Chéreau's death was listed and her will recorded as C 621, 23 April 1755 in the Extracts of the Minutier Central des notaires Parisiens. On 31 March 1768 sale of the inventory of goods of Francois II Chéreau (deceased 22 Feb 1755) were finalized with Jacques-François Chéreau (1742–1794). In 1787 when Jacques-François Chéreau retired, the collection ("fonds") numbering in the tens of thousands of plates, prints and plate blanks was sold to François Etienne Joubert (1787–1836), as well as the business premises, the mark of "Two Pillars of Gold," and book publishing records. Joubert's address is given as rue des Mathurins St. Jacques, aux Deux Piliers d'Or, Paris after the sale and his name may appear with "chez Chéreau" or alone on plates published after that date. In 1821, Joubert published "Manuel de l'amateur d'estampes" with material from the fonds Chéreau.

== Artistic works ==
According to Bryan, “he distinguished himself by the beauty of his touch and the correctness of his drawing, particularly in his portraits, some of which are admirable. His portrait of the Duke of Antin, after Rigaud, which he engraved twice, has rarely been surpassed. He died in Paris in 1729.”

== Portraits ==
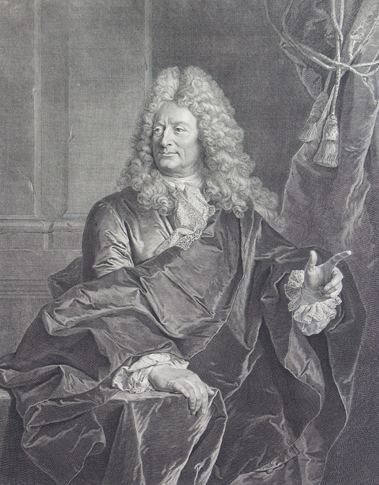
Portrait of Nicolas Delaunay, goldsmith, after a painting by Hyacinthe Rigaud

- Louis de Boullongue; after himself; engraved by Chéreau for his reception into the Academy in 1718.
- Nicolas de Largillière, painter; after himself. (pictured)
- Cardinal André-Hercule de Fleury; after Rigaud; fine.
- Cardinal Melchior de Polignac; after the same; very fine.
- Louis Antoine de Pardaillan de Gondrin, Duke of Antin; after the same.
- Nicolas Delaunay; after the same. (pictured)
- Conrad Detlev von Dehn; after the same; very fine.
- Louis Pécour, Maitre de Ballet; after Tournieres.
- Élisabeth Sophie Chéron, painter; after herself.
- Louisa Mary, Princess of England; after A. S. Belle.
- The Princess Sobieska; after Trinisani.

== Subjects after various masters ==
- St. John in the Wilderness; after the picture by Raphael, in the Orléans Gallery.
- The Crucifixion; after Guido.
- St. Catharine of Siena; after J. André.
- St. Cecilia; after Mignard.
- St. Theresa in Contemplation.
- St. Ignatius de Loyola, Founder of the Society of Jesus.
