= Henri Oswald de La Tour d'Auvergne =

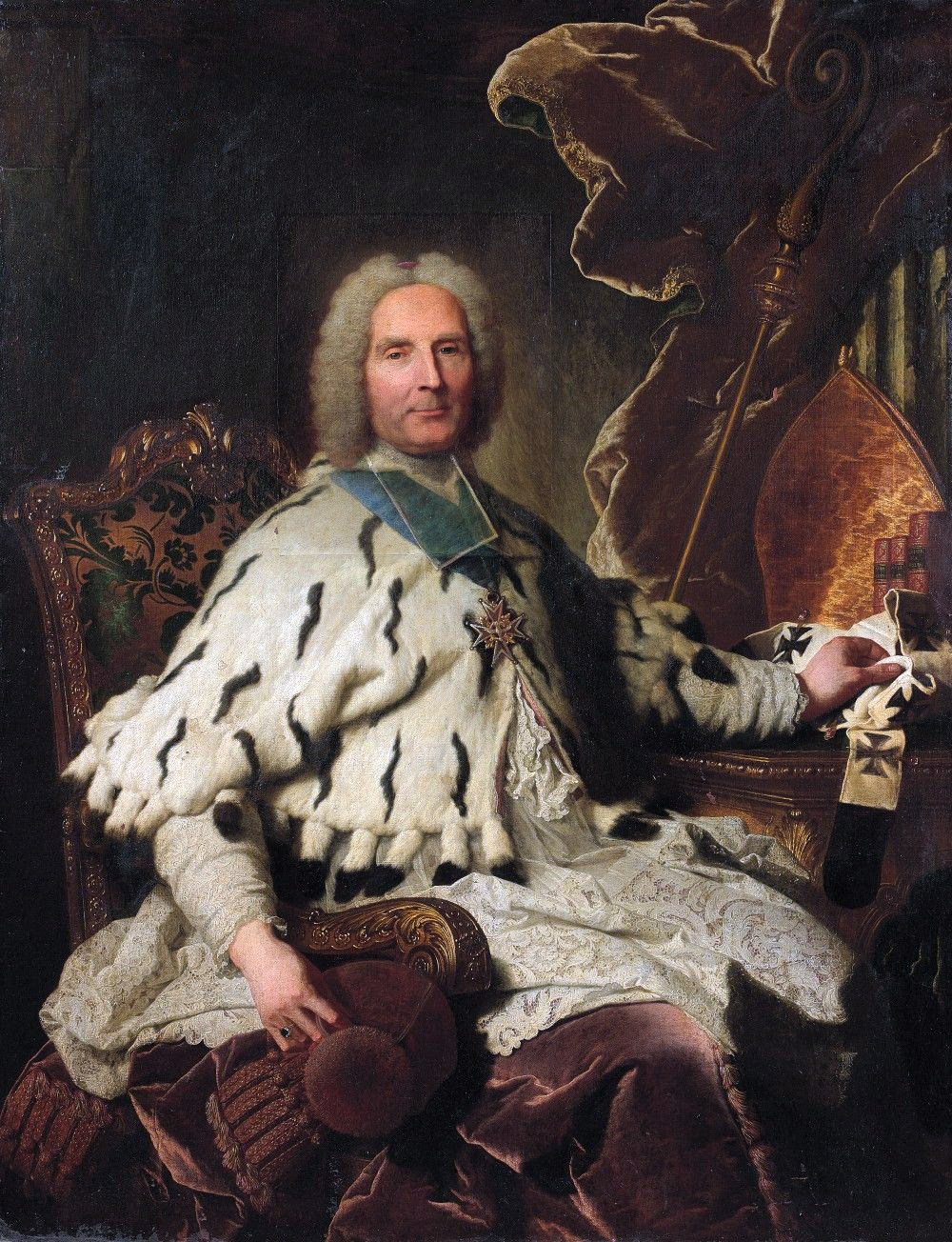
Portrait of Henri-Oswald de La Tour d'Auvergne (1735)– oil on canvas – 150 × 115 cm – private collection, Paris, by Hyacinthe Rigaud.

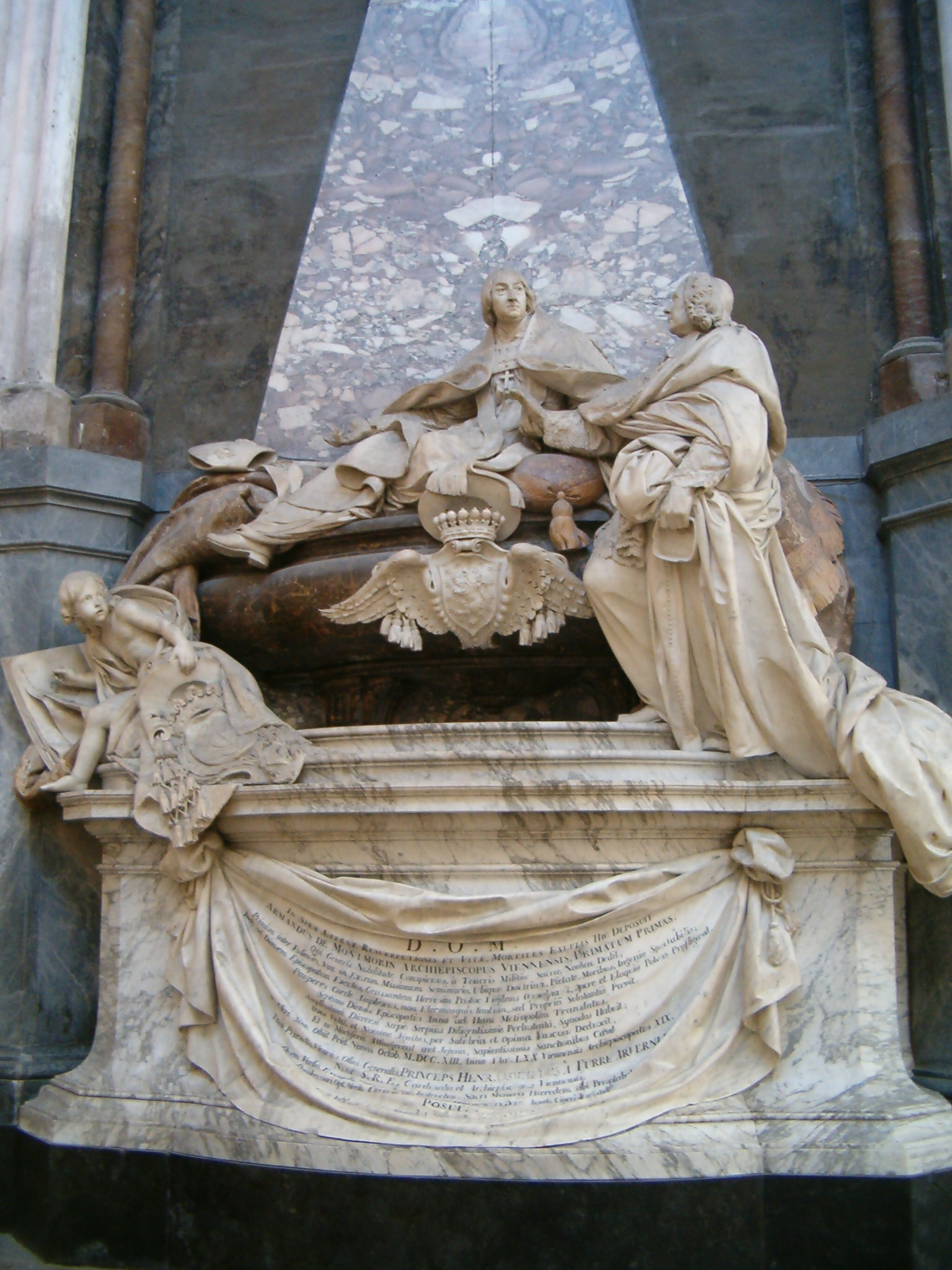
Tomb in Vienne Cathedral of the Archbishops of Vienne, Henri Oswald de La Tour d'Auvergne, and Armand de Montmorin de Saint-Hérem.

Henri Oswald de La Tour d’Auvergne, known as Abbé d’Auvergne and later as Cardinal d’Auvergne (Barcy, 5 November 1671 - Paris, 22 April 1747) was a French Archbishop and Cardinal.

== Biography ==
Henri Oswald de La Tour d’Auvergne was born in the House of La Tour d'Auvergne as 11th of the 13 children of Frédéric-Maurice de La Tour d’Auvergne and Franziska von Hohenzollern-Hechingen (1642–1698, Margravine of Bergen-op-Zoom). His grandfathers were Frédéric Maurice de La Tour d'Auvergne, Duc de Bouillon and Eitel Frederick II of Hohenzollern-Hechingen. The Cardinal de Bouillon was his uncle.

He was destined for a career in the Church. He completed his education at the Sorbonne, graduating as a Doctor of Theology in May 1695.
In 1684, he became a canon at Strasbourg Cathedral, and later at St. Lambert's Cathedral in Liège. From 1692 to 1740, he held the position of Commendatory abbot ("abbé commendataire") of Saint-Sauveur in Redon, and from 1694, of Saint-Pierre et Saint-Paul de Châtillon-lès-Conches. He served as vicar general to his uncle, the Cardinal de Bouillon, at Cluny, Tournus, and Saint-Martin in Pontoise. On 22 April 1697, he became coadjutor at Cluny, when his uncle was sent to Rome as an envoy, and upon his uncle's death in 1715, he succeeded him as abbot of Cluny Abbey. Also in 1697, he became Grand Provost ("Grand Prévôt") of Strasbourg Cathedral.

He did not become a bishop until the age of 58. Pope Clement XI appointed him in late 1719 as Archbishop of Tours, though he remained absent from this archdiocese, and no consecration took place. In 1721 he was appointed as Archbishop of Vienne by Pope Innocent XIII. The election in Vienne took place on 23 March 1722, followed by his episcopal consecration on 10 May 1722. He participated in the Assembly of the Clergy of 1723 and presided over the Assembly of the Clergy of 1734. He served as "Premier Aumônier du Roi" (Chief Almoner to the King) from 1732 to 1742. On 24 May 1733, Louis XV appointed him a Commander of the Order of the Holy Spirit.

He was created a cardinal by Pope Clement XII in the consistory of 20 December 1737. He participated in the 1740 conclave which elected Benedict XIV as pope. Finally, on 16 September 1740, he received the cardinal's insignia and the titular church of San Callisto as a cardinal-priest.
He died in his Paris residence on 22 April 1747.

Henri Oswald de La Tour d’Auvergne had commissioned René-Michel Slodtz (1705–1764) to construct a funerary monument in the choir of Vienne Cathedral, where he is buried alongside his predecessor, Archbishop Armand de Montmorin de Saint-Hérem.

The chronicler Louis de Rouvroy, duc de Saint-Simon detested him because, according to him, "the Abbé d’Auvergne" had a pronounced taste for young valets.

In 1735, he was immortalized in a painting by Hyacinthe Rigaud, the most important painter of his time.,
