= Antoine Ranc =

French painter (c. 1634 – 1716)

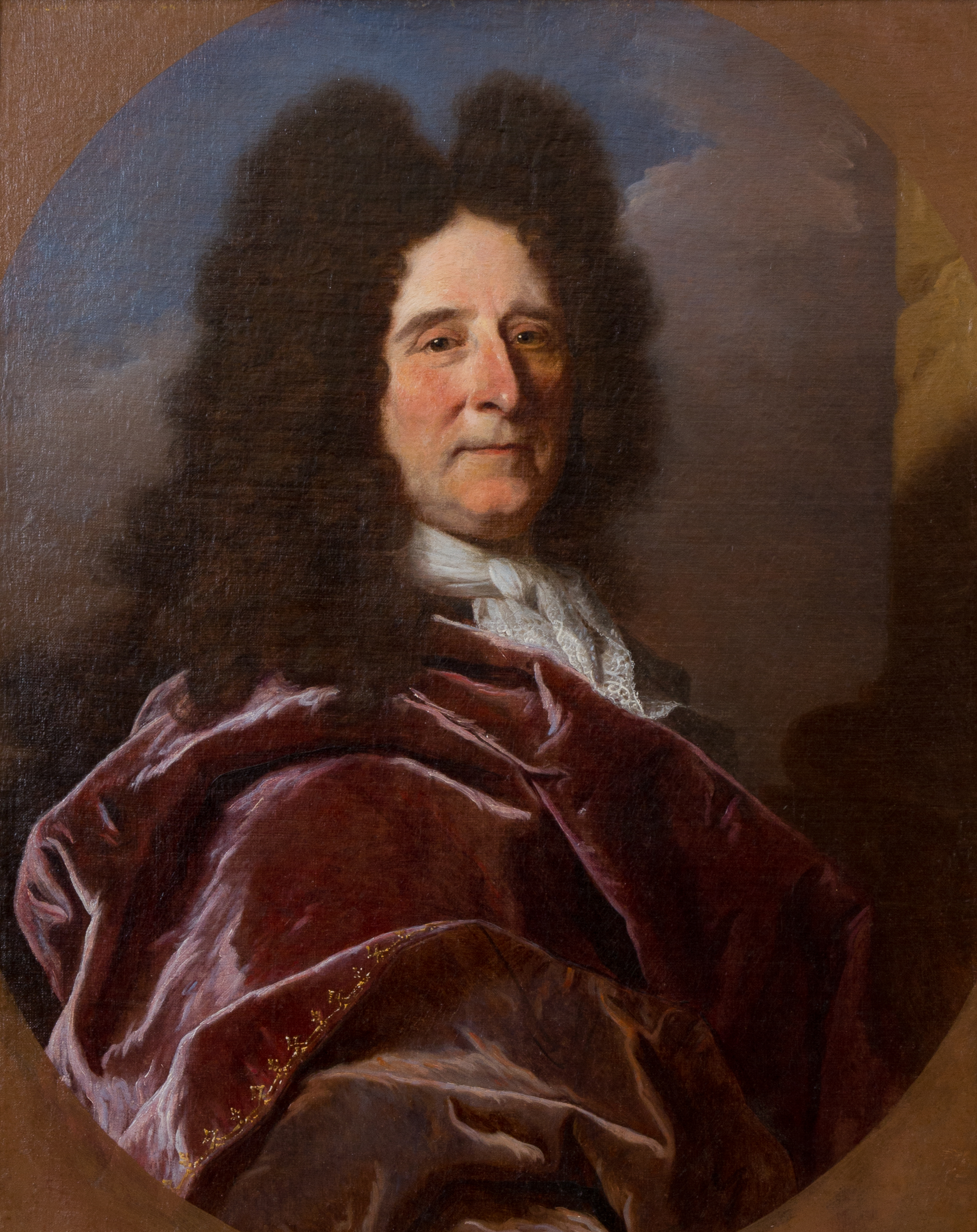
- Presumed portrait of Antoine Ranc by Hyacinthe Rigaud – c. 1687. Narbonne, musée des Beaux-arts
- Born: c. 1634; Montpellier
- Died: 1716 (aged 81–82); Montpellier
- Education: Jean Zueil (presumed)
- Known for: Painting

Antoine Ranc (c. 1634 – 1716) was a French painter.

== Life ==
Antoine Ranc was born at Montpellier around 1634 to a modest family. He became a student of the Flemish artist Jean Zueil, nicknamed "le français" (the Frenchman), who probably brought the north European painting style to that city in the Languedoc. Ranc is also known to have been apprenticed to Zueil's brother in law, the Poussinist Samuel Boissière (1620–1703). Ranc then travelled to Rome around 1654 with François Bertrand, another painter from Montpellier, who became godfather to Ranc's third son in 1677.

From 1667, Ranc was back in his birthplace, where he received the prestigious commission for a major painting for the high altar of the église Notre-Dame-des-Tables. In 1671, the young Hyacinthe Rigaud joined his studio and copied the van Dycks which Ranc owned. Ranc then became associated with Jean de Troy (1638–1691), an artist from Toulouse who had just set up in Montpellier and who would later become director of the newly created Académie des Arts.

Antoine's first two sons, Jean and Guillaume (born 1684) both became painters. In 1685 two more sons followed, one of whom was Jean-baptiste, later a royal engineer. On Jean de Troy's death, Ranc was in even greater demand for religious paintings. The canons of Montpellier Cathedral commissioned de Troy to paint a Curing of the Paralytic and Jesus giving the keys to St Peter to be placed either side of Bourdon's painting, on the condition Ranc worked from Poussin's two drawings. De Troy completed the first of these vast canvases, but the second remained unfinished on his death and it was completed by Ranc (main image) and the landscape artist Charmeton (background landscape)

== See also ==
- Notre-Dame des Tables de Montpellier

== Selected works ==
The bishop of Montpellier Colbert granted Ranc a number of chapel and church commissions:

- a Calvary (1701)
- a Christ on the Cross with the Virgin and Saint Léonce (1701)
- Saint Charles Borromeus (1702)
- a Christ on the Cross with the Virgin and Saint John (1703)
- a Descent from the cross (1707)
- another Saint Charles Borromeus (1710).

Other undated works include eight heads of apostles painted in grisaille for the chapelle des Pénitents Blanc at Montpellier, The Apparition of the angel to Saint Joseph inspired by Mignard in the église Saint-Mathieu, The Apparition of Jesus to the three Maries after his Resurrection, formerly in the église des Matelles, and various portraits.
