= Gaspard Rigaud =

French artist (1661–1705)

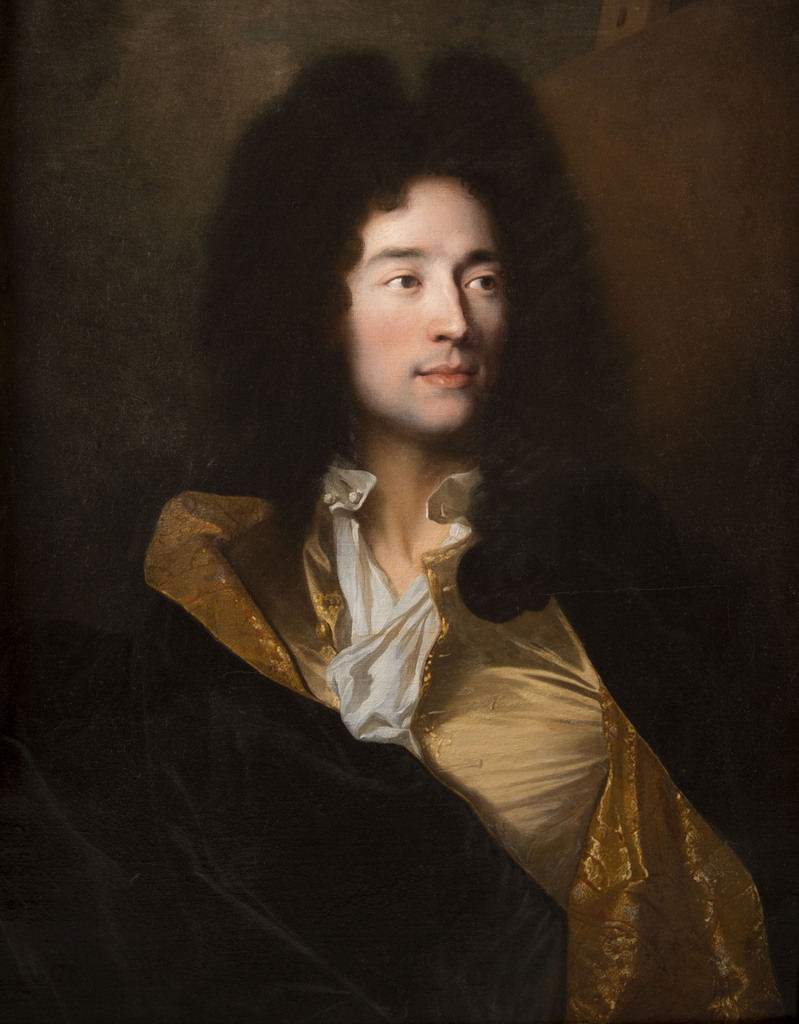
Portrait by Hyacinthe Rigaud, 1691

Gaspard Rigaud (French pronunciation: [ɡaspaʁ ʁiɡo]; 1 June 1661 – 28 March 1705) was a French artist, who primarily worked in portrait painting. He was born in Perpignan, the younger brother of the portraitist Hyacinthe Rigaud. Gaspard's daughter married Hyacinthe's pupil Jean Ranc. Gaspard Rigaud died in Paris.

== Gallery ==
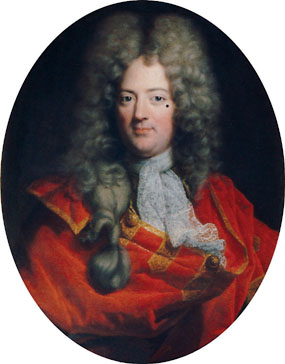
Portrait of a Man (1696)

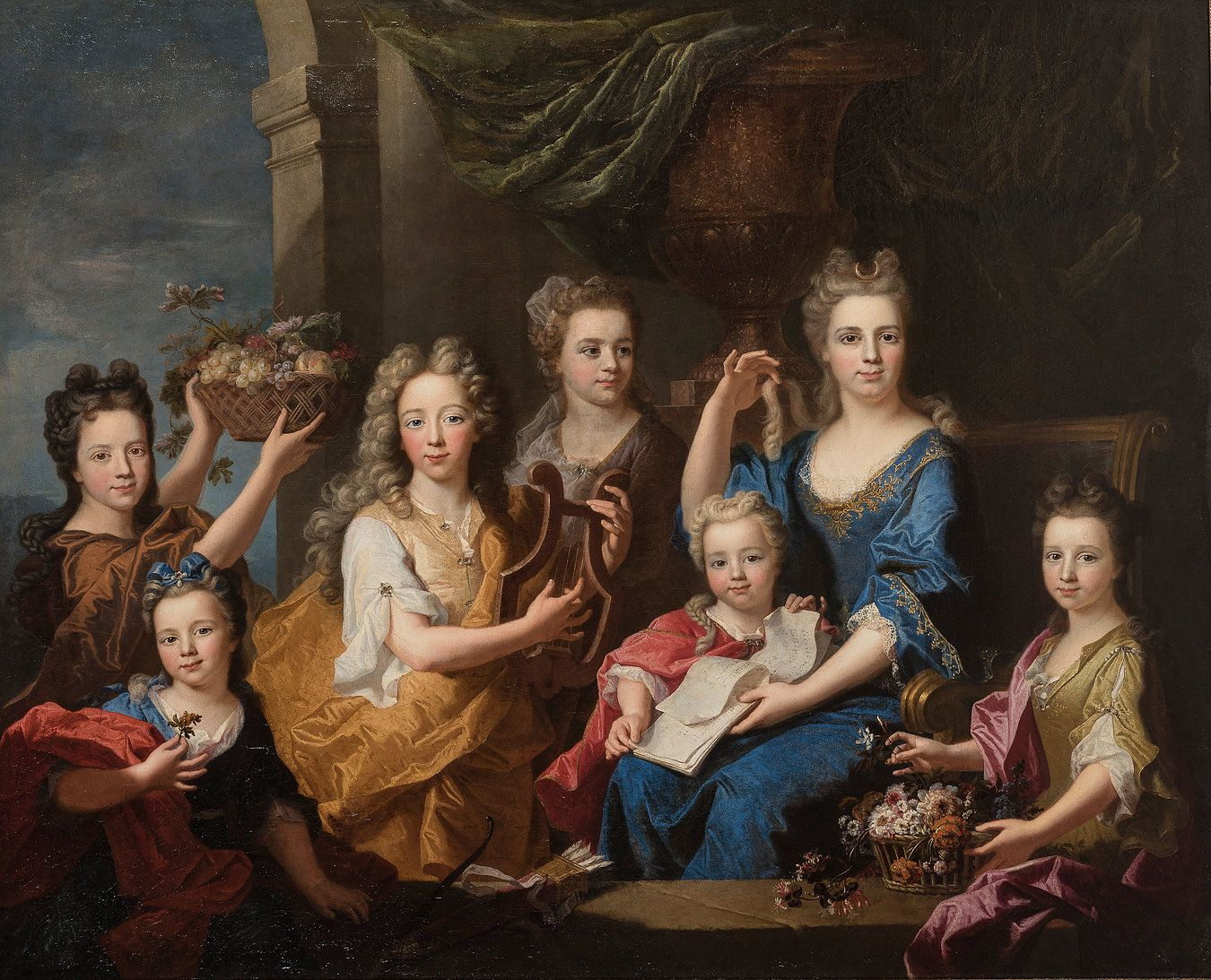
The children of Marie Jacqueline Bouette de Blémur (1703)
