= Jacques Chereau =

Jacques Chéreau (29 October 1688 in Blois, France – 1 December 1776 in Paris) was a portrait engraver, printmaker and publisher of optical prints in a neighborhood of printmakers at the Rue Saint-Jacques variously given on prints as "au Grand St. Remy," "au Coq," or "au dessus de la Fontaine St. Severin", in Paris, France.

== Early history ==
Jacques Chéreau was born the son of a carpenter Simon Chéreau & his wife Anne Hardouin, in Blois. Jacques ("le jeune Chéreau") worked for one year in England where vue optique prints were made, then worked with his older brother François Chéreau (1680 Blois- 10 April 1729) who had studied with Pierre Drevet and Gérard Audran. François acquired Audran's plates in 1718 about the same time he was accepted to the academy.

== Later years ==
Jacques married Anne Antoinette Yvart (1688 – 28 September 1722), the daughter of painter Joseph Yvart on 9 February 1722 at St. Hippolyte. After Anne died, Jacques married Marguerite-Geneviève Chiquet (?- 11 May 1773), the daughter of engraver Jacques Chiquet (1673–1721) on 12 January 1724. They had nine children. One of their daughters, Anne Louise, married Jacques (or James) Gabriel Huquier (1730–1805) on 30 November 1758 at Paris. Huquier collaborated with Chéreau for three years, later printing and selling wallpapers and prints. In 1772, Huquier abandoned his family, moved permanently to England, leaving his three daughters in the care of the Chéreau family. Jacques' son Jacques-Simon married Louise-Pierrette Charpentier (?- 7 July 1796), engraver and daughter of engraver Etienne Charpentier in September 1760 Brother François named one of his sons for uncle Jacques.

Jacques Chéreau died of old age and fever at age 88 on 1 December 1776 at the home of his grandson, Jacques-François Chéreau (1742–1794) who continued the printmaking business. Prints from this time are credited to "Jacques Chéreau" without distinction or to "Jacques-François Chéreau." Jacques Chéreau was buried at the Church of St. Benedict (St. Benoit) on 2 December 1776.

== Productions ==
=== Vue Optique Prints ===
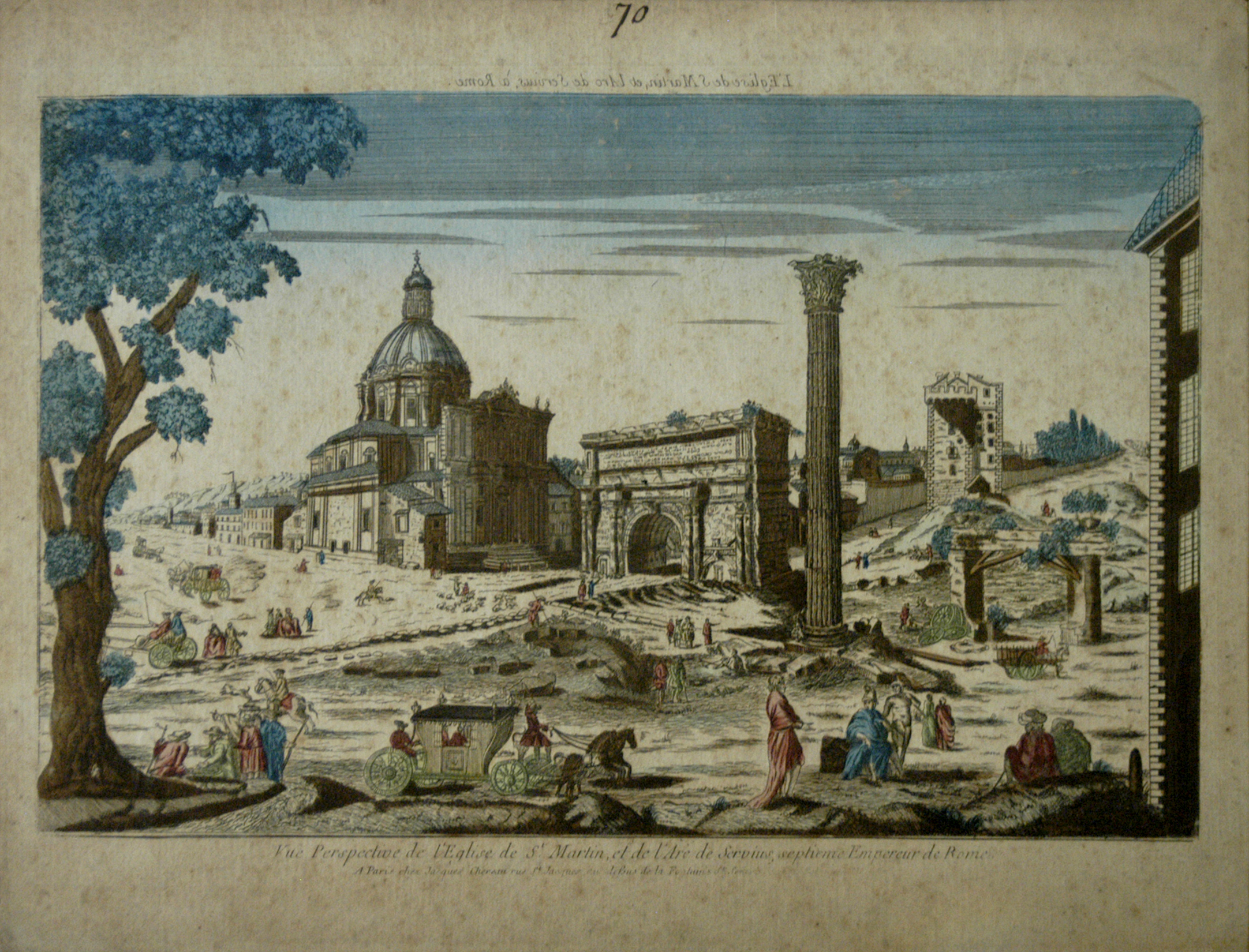
An Optical Print of The Roman Forum by Jacques Chereau

From about 1740 to about 1820 optical prints, also called "vue optique" or "vue d'optique" prints were made to be viewed through a Zograscope, or other devices of convex lens and mirror, all of which produced optical illusion of depth. Intaglio optical prints have exaggerated converging lines and bright hand colors which contribute to the illusion of depth. Typically the legends of optical prints have reversed words along the top edge as those would be seen though the scope, but words on the bottom of the prints are normal. Jacques and his brother were considered some of the most prolific publishers of prints in Paris. Subjects include current events, views of the known world, and fantasy compositions.

=== Artistic Works ===
According to Bryan, the following are his best works:

==== Portraits ====
- Marie Leszczynska, Queen of France; after Van Loo.
- Madame de Sabran; after the same.
- Madame de Prie; after the same.
- Henri, Duke of Harcourt, marshal of France; after Madame de Sévigné.
- George I, King of Great Britain; profile, after Kneller.
- Jeanne d'Aragon, Queen of Sicily; after Raphael.

==== Subjects after various masters ====
- The Holy Family; after Raphael; in the Crozat Collection.
- La Belle Jardinière; after the same; in the same Collection.
- The Transfiguration; after the same.
- David with the Head of Goliath; after Teti; very fine.
- David and Bathsheba; after Raoux.
- Christ washing the Feet of the Apostles; after N. Bertin.
- Vertumnus and Pomona; after F. Marot.
- The Descent from the Cross; after Charpentier.
