= Hyacinthe Rigaud =

French baroque painter (1659–1743)

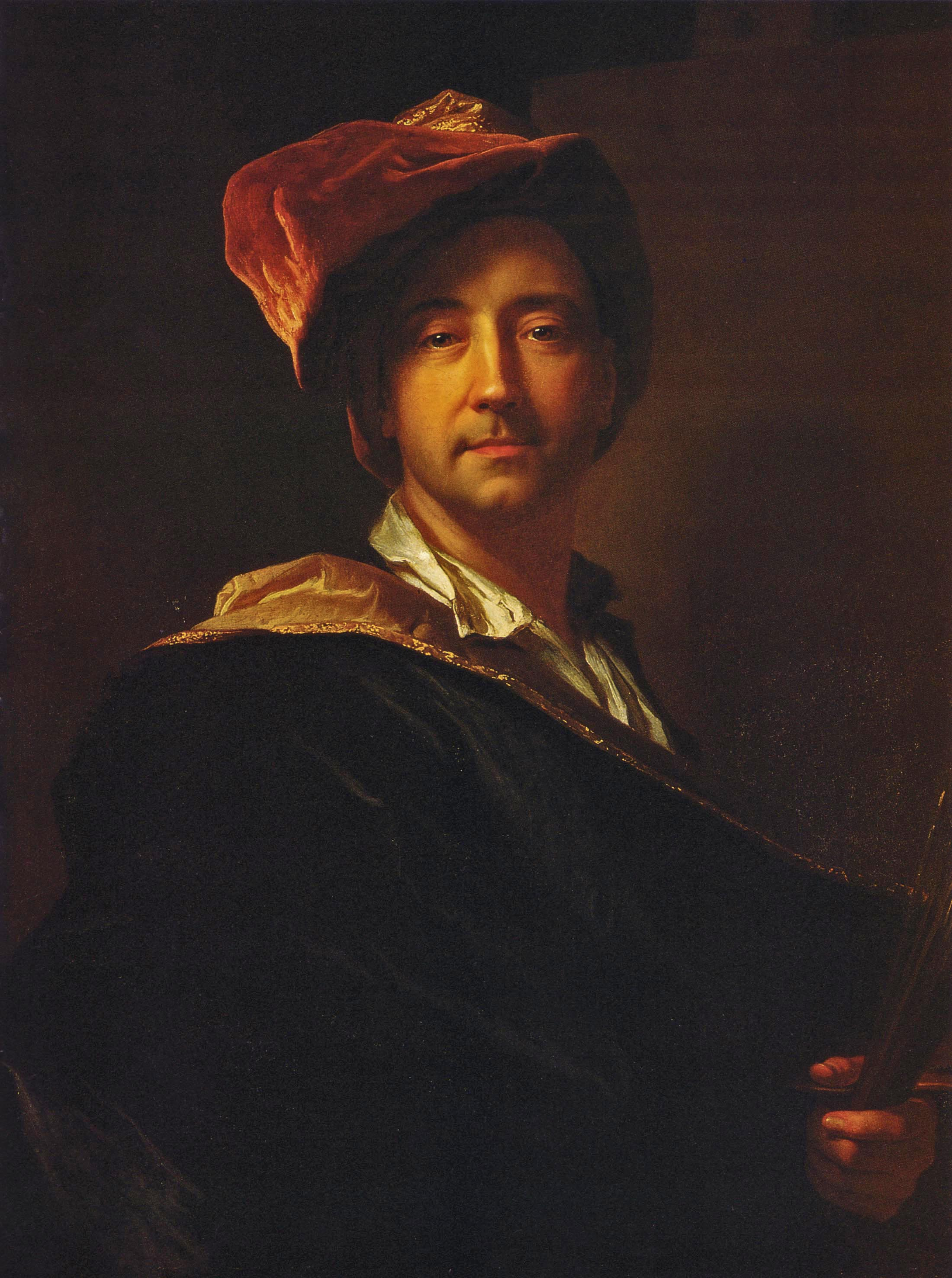
- Self-portrait, 1698
- Born: Jacint Rigau-Ros i Serra; 18 July 1659; Perpignan, Principality of Catalonia, Crown of Aragon (Habsburg Spain)
- Died: 29 December 1743 (aged 84); Paris, France
- Education: Charles Le Brun; Paul Pezet (presumed); Antoine Ranc (presumed)
- Known for: Portrait painting
- Notable work: Portrait of Louis XIV, 1701
- Movement: Baroque
- Awards: Prix de Rome (1682)

Signature
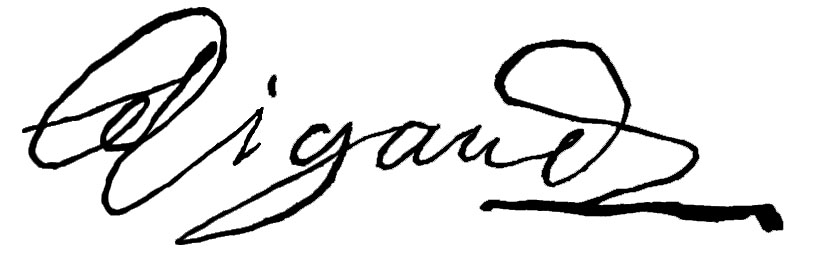

Director of the Académie de Peinture et de Sculpture
- In office 1733–1735 (Note: The directorship of the Académie was shared until February 1735 between Rigaud and the three other rectors: Guillaume Coustou, Claude-Guy Hallé, and Nicolas de Largillière)
- Monarch: Louis XV
- Preceded by: Louis de Boullogne
- Succeeded by: Guillaume Coustou

Jacint Rigau-Ros i Serra (Catalan pronunciation: [ʒəˈsin riˈɣaw ˈrɔz i ˈsɛrə]; 18 July 1659 – 29 December 1743), known in French as Hyacinthe Rigaud (pronounced [jasɛ̃t ʁiɡo]), was a French baroque painter most famous for his portraits of Louis XIV and other members of the French nobility.

Born in the province of Roussillon, Jacint Rigau, whose name was Frenchified to Hyacinthe Rigaud, is considered one of the most celebrated French portrait painters of the classical period. According to Jacques Thuillier, professor at the Collège de France: "Hyacinthe Rigaud was one of those French painters who, under the Ancien Régime, achieved the highest fame as portraitists. This admiration was deserved both for the abundance of his output and for its constant perfection."

Rigaud owes his fame to the loyalty of the Bourbon dynasty, whose likenesses he painted across four generations. He drew most of his clientele from the wealthiest circles, among the bourgeoisie, financiers, nobles, industrialists, and ministers. His body of work provides an almost complete gallery of portraits of the leaders of the Kingdom of France between 1680 and 1740. A smaller part of his production, however, consists of more modest sitters: relatives, friends, artists, or ordinary merchants.

Inseparable from his famous 1701 Portrait of Louis XIV in Coronation Robes, Rigaud associated with all the great ambassadors of his century and several European monarchs. The exact number of paintings by the artist remains disputed, since his catalogue is extensive, but specialists agree that he painted more than a thousand different sitters. To this must be added the large number of copies recorded in the artist's account book, which nonetheless does not mention several hundred other canvases discovered since its publication in 1919.

Grandson of gilder painters in Roussillon, trained in his father's tailoring workshop, Hyacinthe Rigaud honed his skills under Antoine Ranc in Montpellier starting in 1671, before moving to Lyon four years later. It was in these two cities that he became familiar with Flemish, Dutch, and Italian painting, that of Rubens, Van Dyck, Rembrandt, and Titian, whose works he later collected.

Arriving in Paris in 1681, he won the Prix de Rome in 1682, but did not make the trip to Rome, on the advice of Charles Le Brun. Admitted to the Académie royale de peinture et de sculpture in 1700, he rose through every rank of that institution until his resignation in 1735.

According to the French art writer Louis Hourticq: "In dying, Rigaud left behind a gallery of great figures with whom our imagination now populates the Hall of Mirrors; Rigaud is essential to the glory of Louis XIV, and he shares in the radiance of a reign whose majesty he captured." True "photographs", faces that Diderot called "letters of recommendation written in a language common to all men", Rigaud's works now populate the greatest museums in the world.

== Biography ==
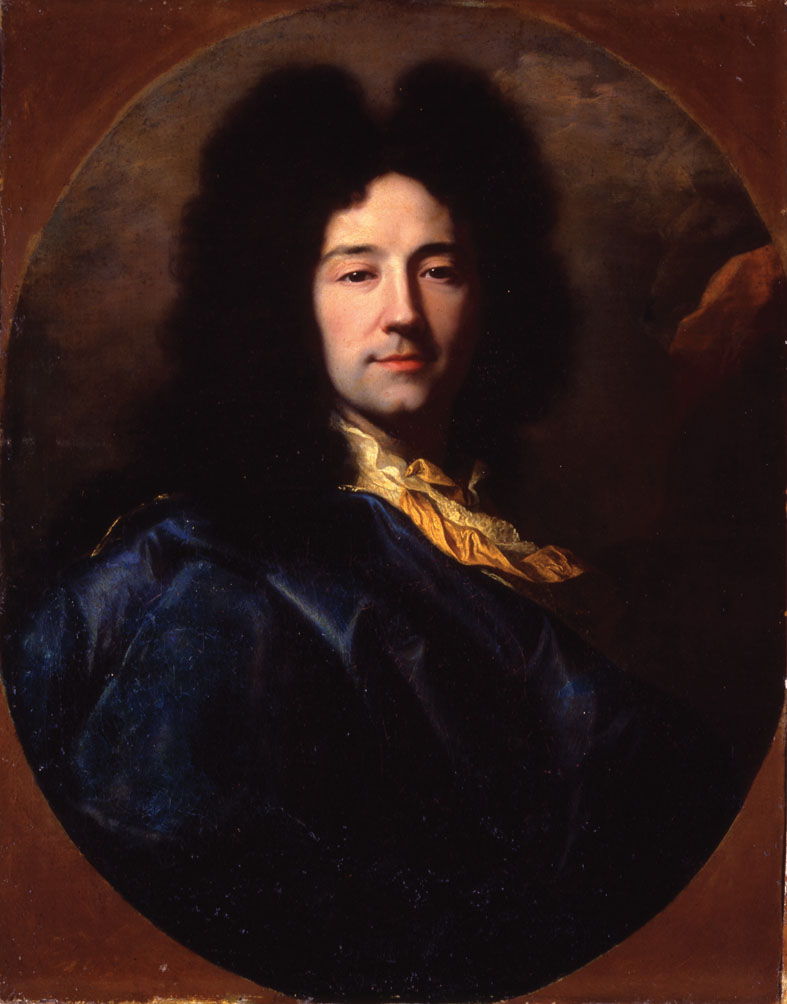
Self-portrait with a blue coat (1696)

Rigaud was born in Perpignan, then part of the Principality of Catalonia, a few months before the Monarchy of Spain ceded the city to France under the Treaty of the Pyrenees (7 November 1659). His family, the Rigau, were Catalan; he was the son of a tailor, the grandson of painter-gilders from Roussillon, and the elder brother of Gaspard Rigaud, also a painter.

Rigaud was baptised with his Catalan name in the old Cathédrale Saint-Jean-Baptiste de Perpignan on 20 July 1659, two days after his birth at rue de la Porte-d'Assaut. His baptismal name was Jyacintho Rigau or Jacint Rigau i Ros This is sometimes transliterated as Híacint Francesc Honrat Mathias Pere Martyr Andreu Joan Rigau (Note: there are reportedly other names (sources vary): different last names at birth: Hyacinthe-François-Honoré-Mathias-Pierre Martyr-André Jean Rigau y Ros or François Hyacinthe Rigaud, or Hyacinthe Riguad and Hiacint Rigau, different first names at birth: Jyacintho, Francisco, Honorat, Matias, Pere, Martir, Andreu, and Joan) After the Roussillon and the Cerdanya were ceded to France the following 7 November owing to the Treaty of the Pyrenees, the Rigau remained in Roussillon, and became French subjects.

He was trained in tailoring in his father's workshop, but perfected his skills as a painter under Antoine Ranc at Montpellier from 1671 onwards, before moving to Lyon four years later. It was in these cities that he became familiar with Flemish, Dutch and Italian painting, particularly that of Rubens, Van Dyck, Rembrandt and Titian, whose works he later collected. Arriving in Paris in 1681, he won the prestigious scholarship known as the prix de Rome in 1682, but on the advice of Charles Le Brun did not make the trip to Rome which was included in the scholarship. Rigaud was received into the Académie royale de peinture et de sculpture in 1710, and he rose to the top of this institution before retiring from it in 1735.

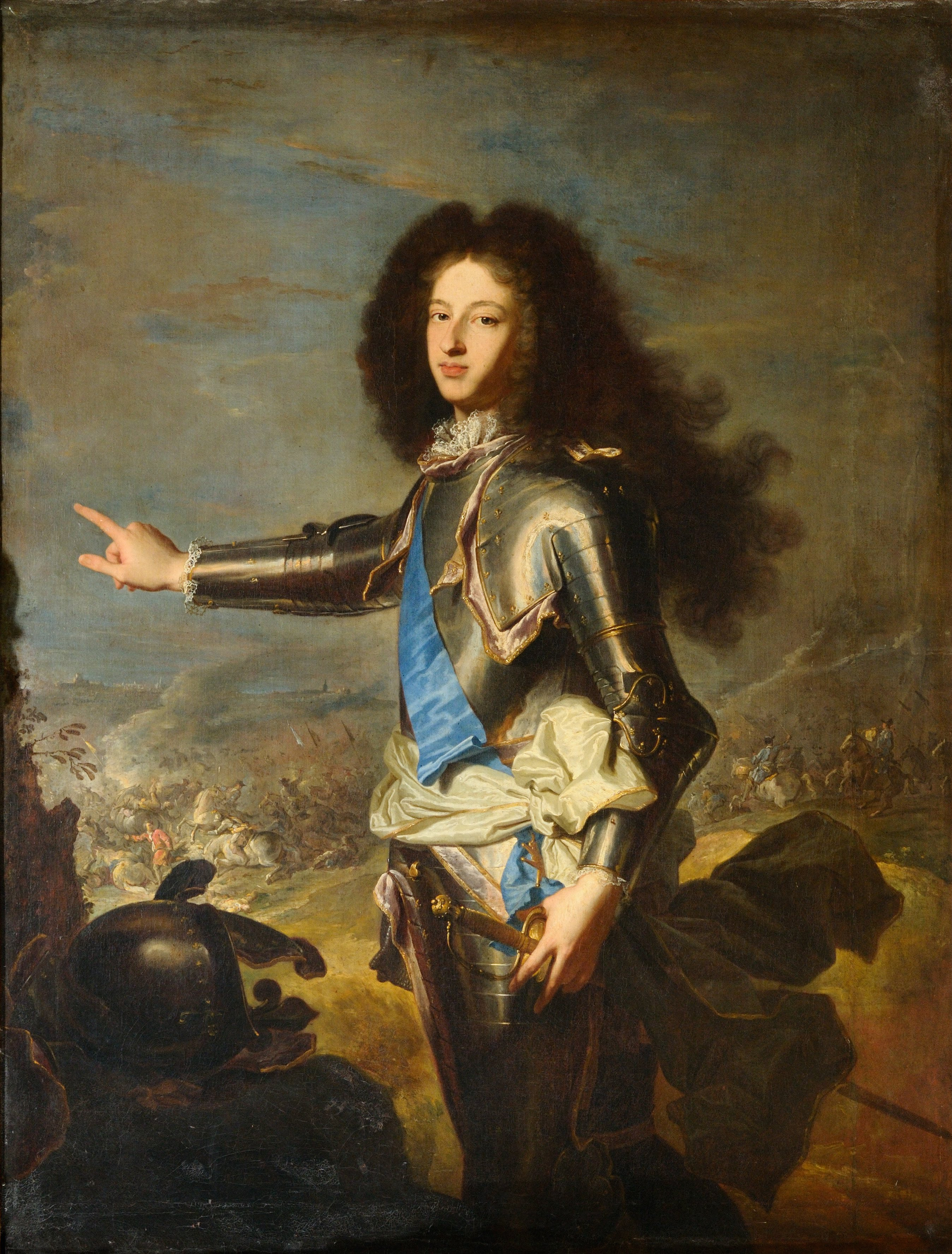
Louis, Duke of Burgundy (1682–1712), grandson of King Louis XIV (1638–1715) and son of Louis the Grand Dauphin (1661–1711).

Since Rigaud's paintings captured very exact likenesses along with the subject's costumes and background details, his paintings are considered precise records of contemporary fashions.

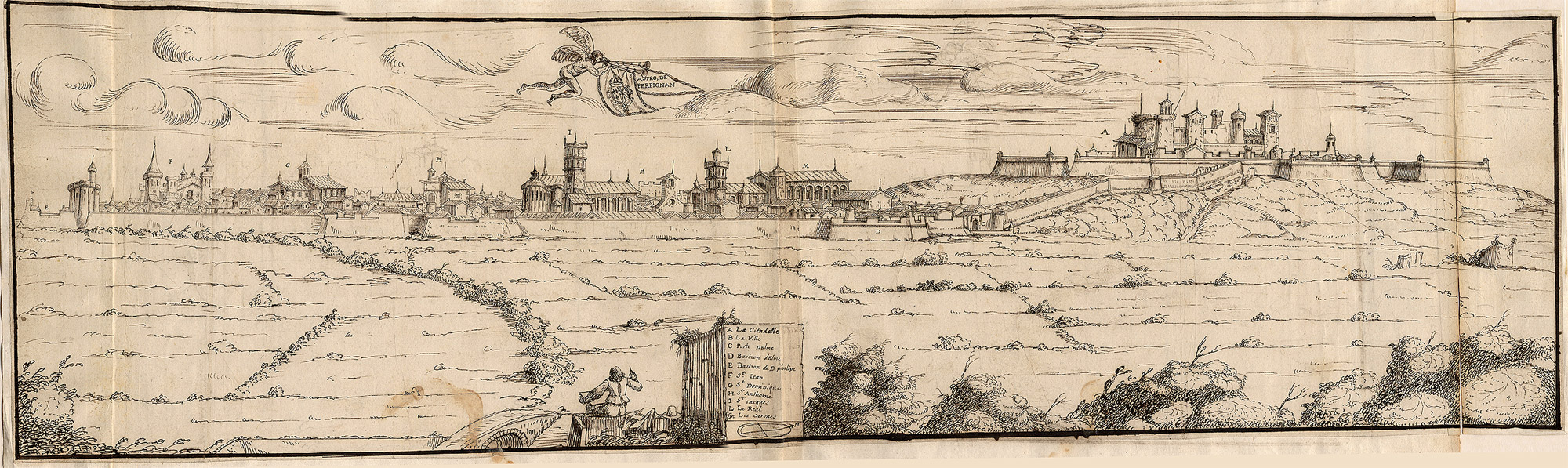
Perpignan in 1642 (ADPO (ca)

== Family ==
Hyacinthe's father, Josep Matias Pere Ramon Rigau, was a tailor in the parish of Saint-Jean de Perpignan, "as well as a painter", descended from a line of well-established artists in the Perpignanian basin who had been commissioned to decorate several tabernacles and other panels for liturgical use. Few of these have survived to the present (Palau-del-Vidre, Perpignan, Montalba-d'Amélie, Joch...). Hyacinthe's grandfather, Jacinto major, (Note: died in 1631. On 25 July 1617, in the église de La Réal in Perpignan, he married Madalena Roat. She was the widow of Pera Roat and on 1 November 1634 remarried in the église Saint-Mathieu in Perpignan, to Antoni Balasco.) and even more Jacinto's father, Honorat minor, (Note: His year of birth unknown, on 5 July 1617 in the église de La Réal in Perpignan he married Antiga Franch, widow of Antoni Franch) were heads of the family and the local art world from 1570 to 1630; probably as much as gilders as painters, since in their studios were to be found "many prints and books treating on the art of painting, and other things, such as brushes and palettes for painting".

Working for the collège Saint-Éloi in his city since 1560, and acting as representative of its guild of painters and gilders, on 22 November 1630 Jacinto major and other gilders and colleagues (Note: Joan Antoni Marti, Guillem Andreu, Thomas Blat et Jaume Fuster) participated in the development of the statutes and minutes of the city's collège Saint-Luc . Honorat minor is generally identified as the painter of The Canonisation of Saint Hyacinthe, formerly in Perpignan's Dominican convent and now at Joch, the tabernacle of the church of Palau-del-Vidre (28 March 1609) and the retable at Montalba near Amélie-les-Bains. The father of Honorat minor is generally identified as the painter of the retable of Saint-Ferréol (1623) in the église Saint-Jacques de Perpignan and formerly in the couvent des Minimes, whilst Honorat major is usually identified as the painter of the paintings of the retable of the église Saint-Jean-l'Évangéliste at Peyrestortes.

On 13 March 1647, Hyacinthe's father Matias Rigau married Thérèse Faget (1634–1655), daughter of a carpenter. (Note: Joan Antoni Faget had already died, in 1647. The marriage contract was witnessed before Honoré Sunyer in Perpignan.) Widowed shortly after, he decided to speedily remarry, to Maria Serra, daughter of a Perpignan textile merchant (pentiner in Catalan), on 20 December 1655. In 1665, he acquired a house "en lo carrer de las casas cremades" (now rue de l'Incendie, near the cathedral) and received the income from a parcel of vineyards in the Bompas territory. By his second marriage, he also acquired a house on place de l'Huile, but he soon sold it.

=== Journey to Lyon ===
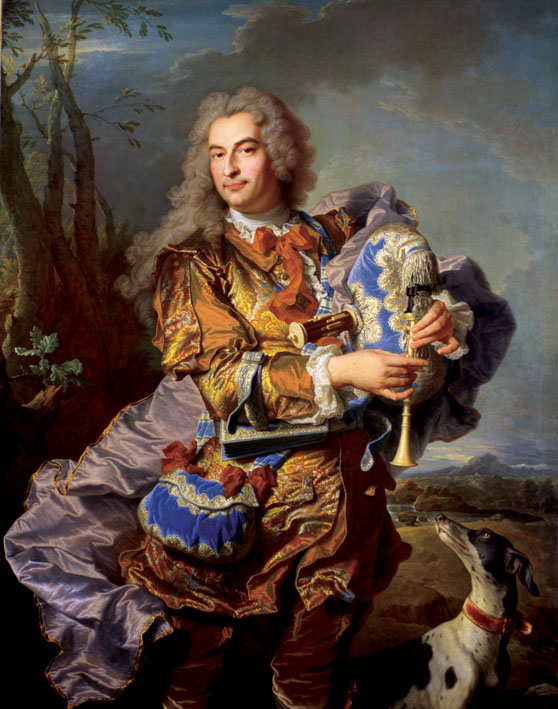
"Gaspard de Gueidan playing the musette" (Gaspard de Gueidan en joueur de musette, 1738), Musée Granet, Aix-en-Provence.

Little is known about Rigaud's activities in Lyon, due to the lack of surviving documents. However, as per tradition, artists from Montpellier had strong ties with this city, as had, for example, Samuel Boissière who was trained in there, in Lyon. The identity of Rigaud's future depicted models shows that he worked for the city's cloth merchants, whose flourishing trade had long since given the city its profitable income.

Even if they had only been registered from 1681 onwards, the date when he moved to Paris, his "youthful" portraits were probably pre-dated, like those of Antoine Domergue, the king's councillor and provincial governor of Lyon, in 1686, and "Mr Sarazin de Lion", of a famous dynasty of bankers of Swiss origins, in 1685. Rigaud's portrait of Jean de Brunenc, painted in 1687, a silk merchant, banker and consul of Lyon, assembles all the ingredients for which the painter was later successful.

In her thesis on the engravers from the Drevet family, Gilberte Levallois-Clavel revealed certain aspects of the private relations between Rigaud and Pierre Drevet; their friendship came about at the beginning of the 1700s, after the painter produced a portrait of the engraver, in which he depicted himself as well.

In 1681, when Hyacinthe Rigaud decided to move to Paris, inspired by Drevet who was also attracted to the capital, he had already established a good reputation amongst the local clientele, from Switzerland to Aix-en-Provence.

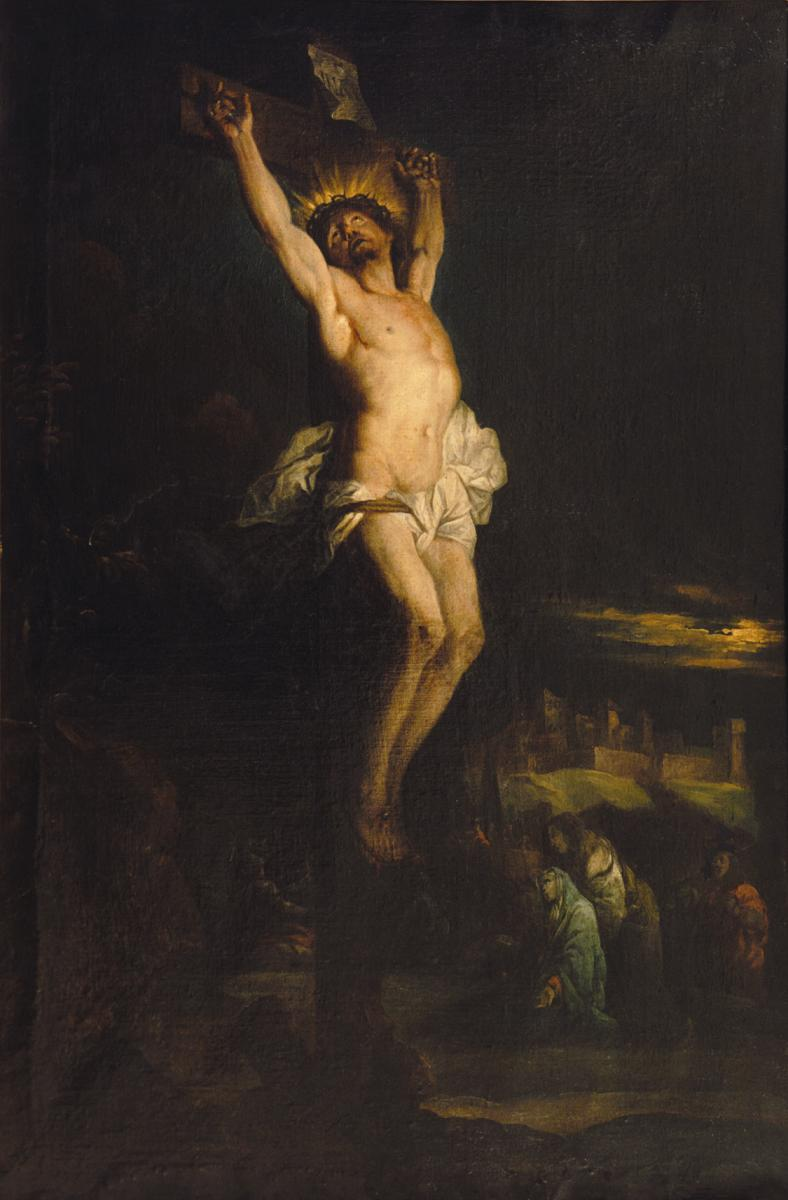
Christ expiant sur la Croix, Hyacinthe Rigaud, 1695

Going back to the artist's biography, Dezallier d'Argenville states that one of Rigaud's main reasons for his 1695 voyage was to paint his mother's portrait: "He painted her from many angles, and had her marble bust made by the notable Coysevox, which was his cabinet's ornament for the rest of his life". In his first will, dated 30 May 1707, the artist left the bust to the Grand Dauphin, Louis XIV's son, though the sculpture would then be left to the Academy which explains its presence in the Louvre. Also in the document, Rigaud bequeathed the portrait containing the two profiles of Maria Serra to the elder son of his brother Gaspard, named Hyacinthe.

In reality, Rigaud painted a second painting, bearing the three stances presented to Coysevox: an oval painting kept in a private collection, copied by Théodore Géricault, in Dijon, and the subject of one of Drevet's engravings. He also applied sketches of his sister Claire, accompanied by her husband and their first daughter, to the canvas.

The year 1695 also saw the production of two versions of Christ expiant sur la Croix, with a distinct Flemish influence, proof of Rigaud's rare incursion into the domain of historical depictions or the "great genre". He bequeathed his mother the first version which would then, at her death, be left to the Grands Augustins convent in Perpignan, and gave the second, in 1722, to the Dominican convent of his city of birth.

In spring 1696, Hyacinthe Rigaud returned to Paris, where he painted one of his most important portraits of the year. This was in fact solicited by the duke of Saint-Simon, to depict Armand Jean le Bouthillier de Rancé, an abbot, using a skillful subterfuge that remains notable in the history of painting.

In 1709, he was made a noble by his hometown of Perpignan. In 1727, he was made a knight of the Order of Saint Michael.

Following the death of directeur Louis de Boullogne on 28 November 1733, Rigaud proposed that the four rectors of the Académie, Nicolas de Largillière, Claude-Guy Hallé, Guillaume Coustou, and himself, rotate the post. This oligarchy would persist until the election of Coustou as sole director on 5 February 1735.

Rigaud died in Paris on 29 December 1743 at the age of 84.

House located rue Louis-le-Grand (Paris 2) where the artist died

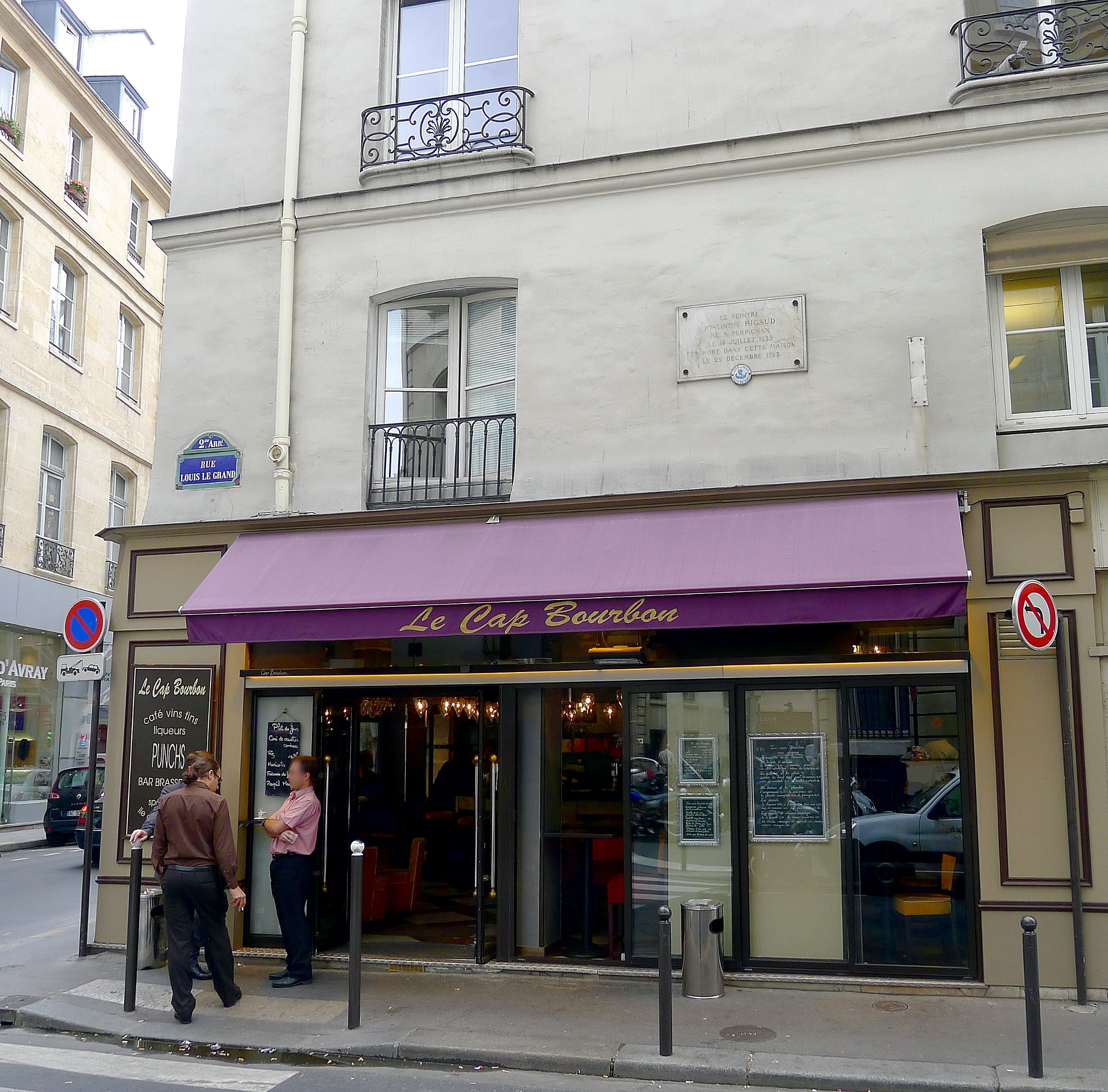
House.

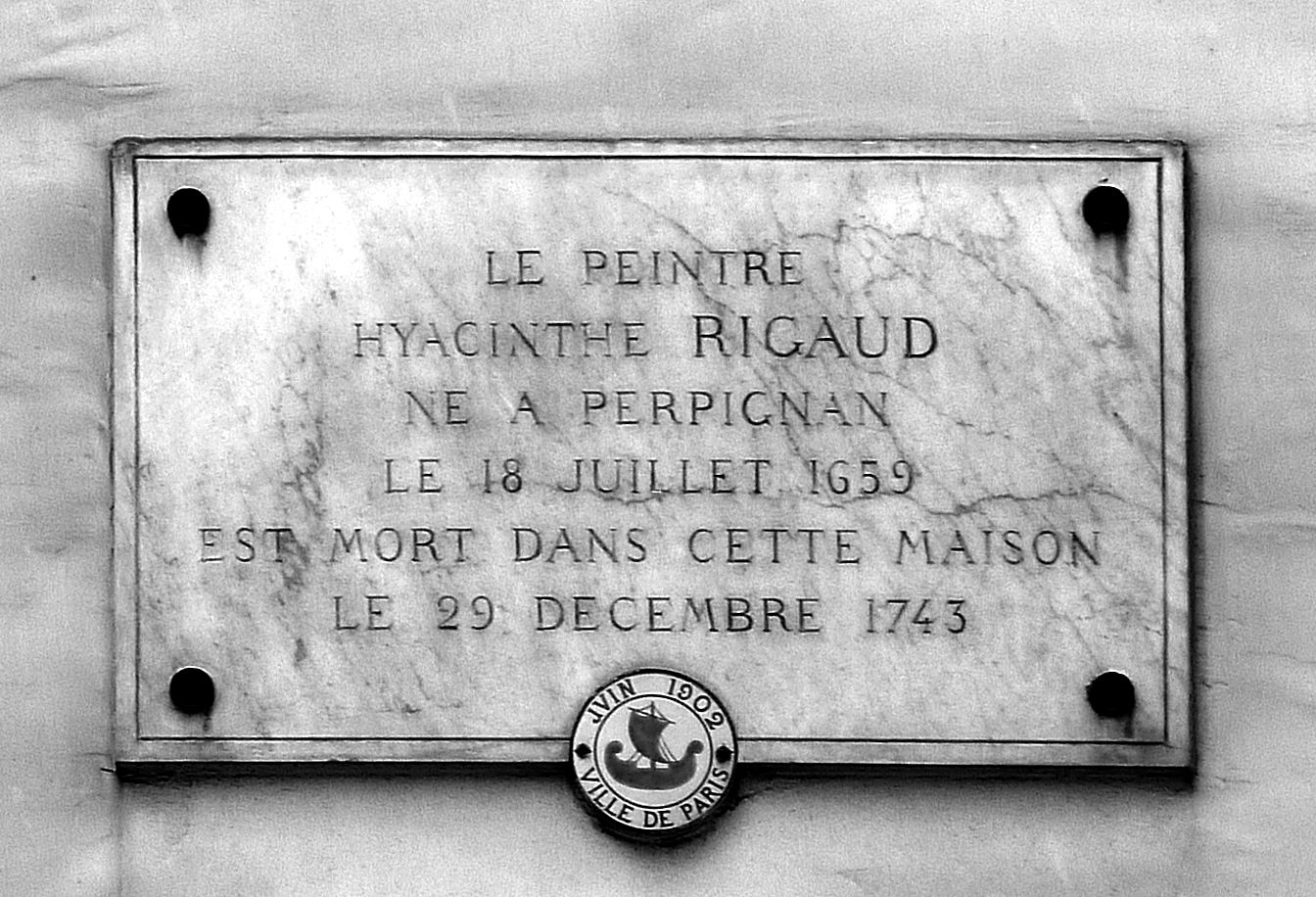
Plaque.

== Clientele ==
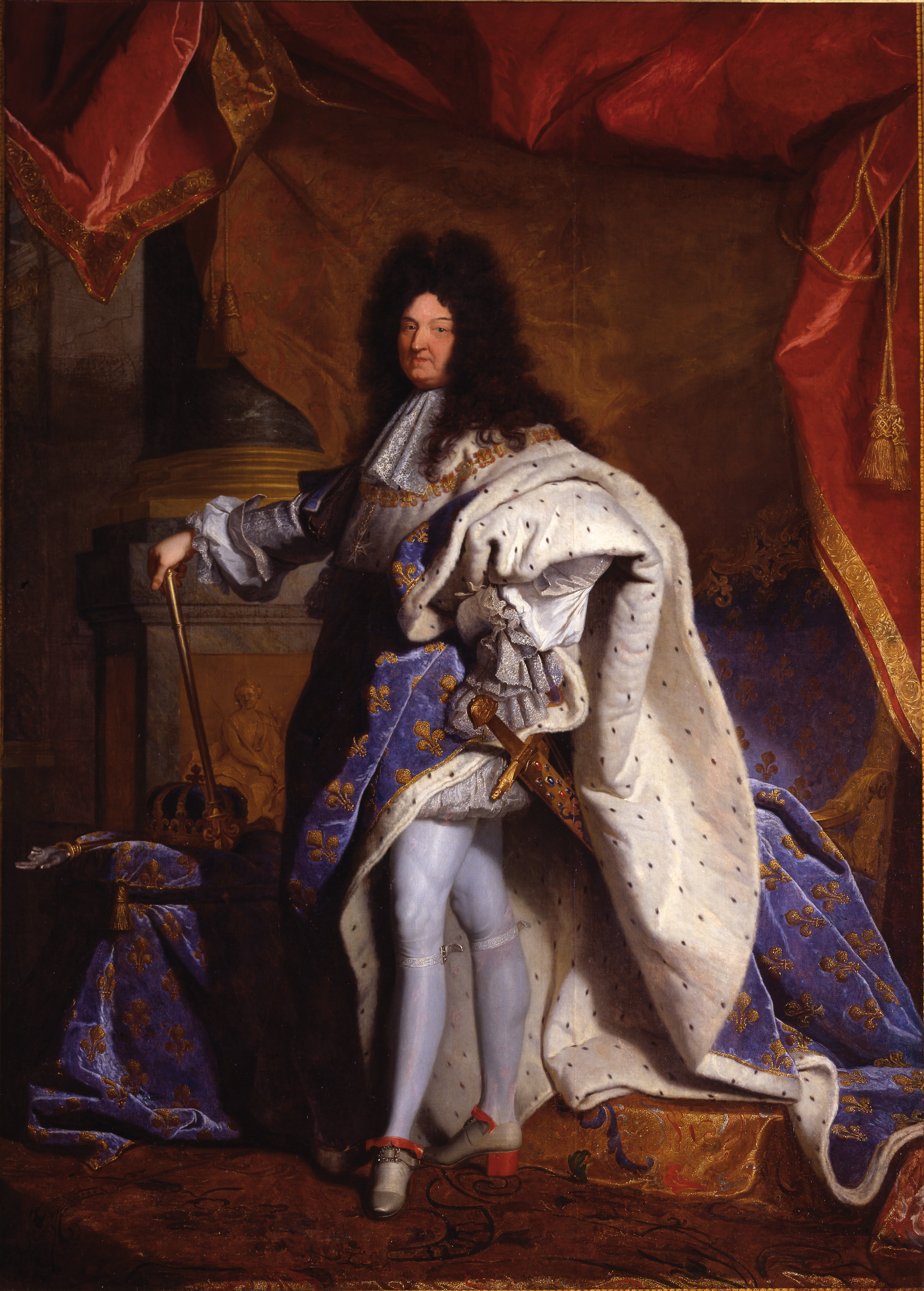
Portrait of Louis XIV, King of France and Navarre, 1701. This piece is arguably Rigaud's most famous work.

He was one of the most important portrait painters during the reign of King Louis XIV. His instinct for impressive poses and grand presentations precisely suited the tastes of the royal personages, ambassadors, clerics, courtiers, and financiers who sat for him. Rigaud owes his celebrity to the faithful support he received from the four generations of Bourbons whose portraits he painted; namely King Louis XIV, next his son Louis, Grand Dauphin, then the King's grandson (the Grand Dauphin's son) Louis, Duke of Burgundy (also called the Petit Dauphin), and finally the Grand Dauphin's grandson (the Petit Dauphin's son), who became the next king—Louis XV, who succeeded his great-grandfather Louis XIV in 1715. He garnered the core of his clientele among the richest circles as well as among the bourgeois, financiers, nobles, industrialists and government ministers, also courting all the major ambassadors of his time and several European monarchs. His œuvre reads as a near-complete portrait gallery of the chief movers in France from 1680 to 1740. Some of that œuvre (albeit a minority) also includes those of more humble origins – Rigaud's friends, fellow artists or simple businessmen.

Rigaud is inseparable from his best-known work, a 1701 painting of Louis XIV in his coronation costume which today hangs in the Louvre in Paris, as well as the second copy also requested by Louis XIV that now hangs at the Palace of Versailles.

He is renowned for his portrait paintings of Louis XIV, the royalty and nobility of Europe, and members of their courts and considered one of the most notable French portraitists of the classical period. For Jacques Thuillier, professor at the Collège de France:

Hyacinthe Rigaud was one of those French painters who knew the highest celebrity under the Ancien Régime. This admiration was deserved both for the surprising abundance of his work and for its constant perfection.

According to the French art historian Louis Hourticq,

On his death, Rigaud left behind a gallery of major figures with whom our imagination now populates the galerie des Glaces; Rigaud was necessary to the 'gloire' of Louis XIV and participated in this shining of a reign whose majesty he fixed [in paint].

True "photographs", faces that Diderot called "letters of recommendation written in the common language of all men", Rigaud's works today populate the world's major museums.

== Legacy ==
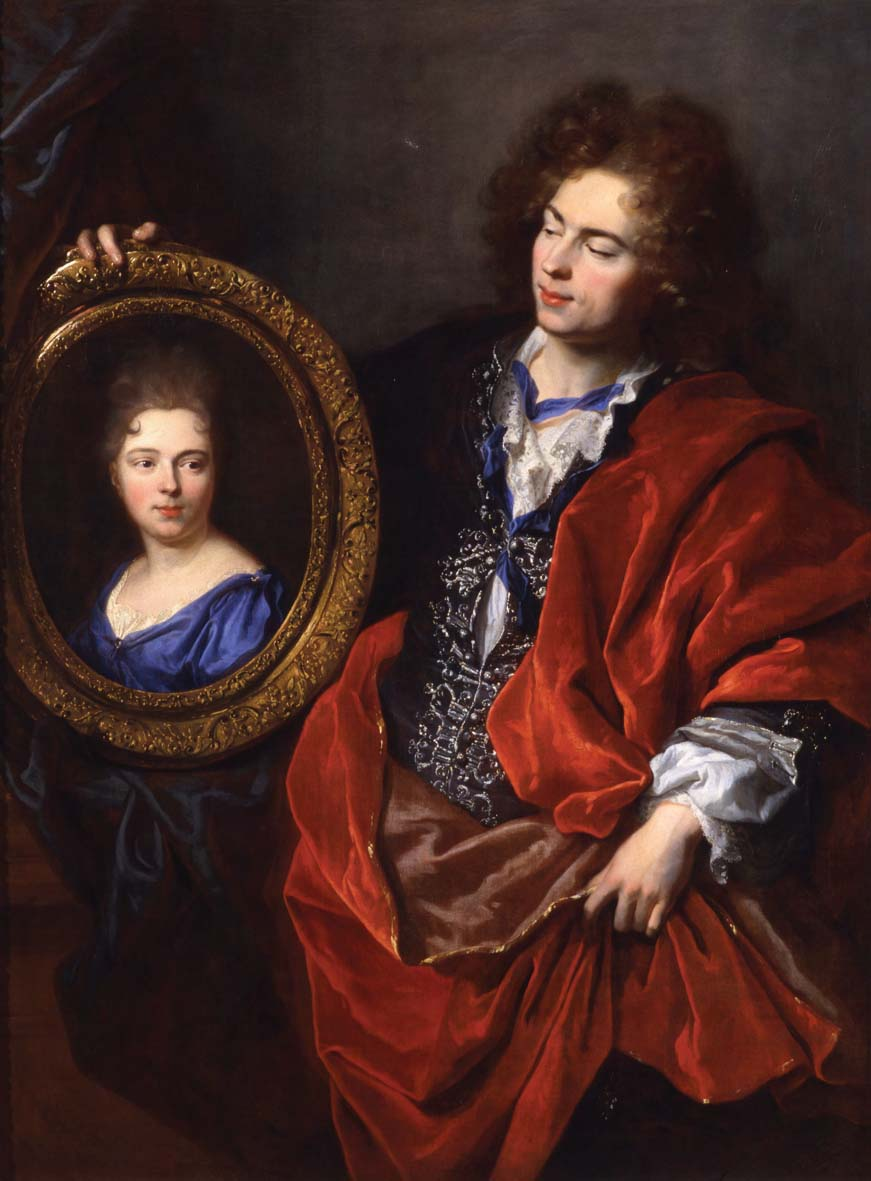
Portrait of Jean-Baptiste de Montginot (1688)

Rigaud's works today populate the world's major museums. The exact number of paintings he produced remains in dispute, since he left a highly detailed catalogue but also more than a thousand different models which specialists agree he used. To these may be added the large number of copies in Rigaud's book of accounts, as well as the hundreds of other paintings rediscovered since the account's publication in 1919. Rigaud painted many important figures in the world of art such as the sculptors Desjardins (to whom, as an old friend, he delivered three successive portraits), Girardon and Coysevox; the painters Joseph Parrocel, La Fosse and Mignard; the architects De Cotte, Hardouin-Mansart and Gabriel. He also painted portraits of poets such as La Fontaine or Boileau, as well as religious figures such as the cardinal de Fleury and Bossuet; many influential archbishops and bishops paid large sums of money for a portrait.

The Musée d'art Hyacinthe Rigaud, a museum dedicated to Rigaud's artwork, opened in Perpignan in 1833. The museum has since expanded to include works by Aristide Maillol, Raoul Dufy, and other artists. It received over 65,000 visitors in 2017 following its renovation and a temporary exhibition dedicated to Picasso.

== Selected works ==
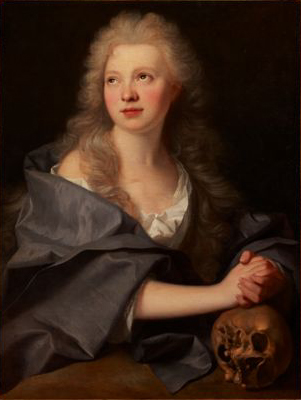
Painting depicting Mary Magdalene in prayer.

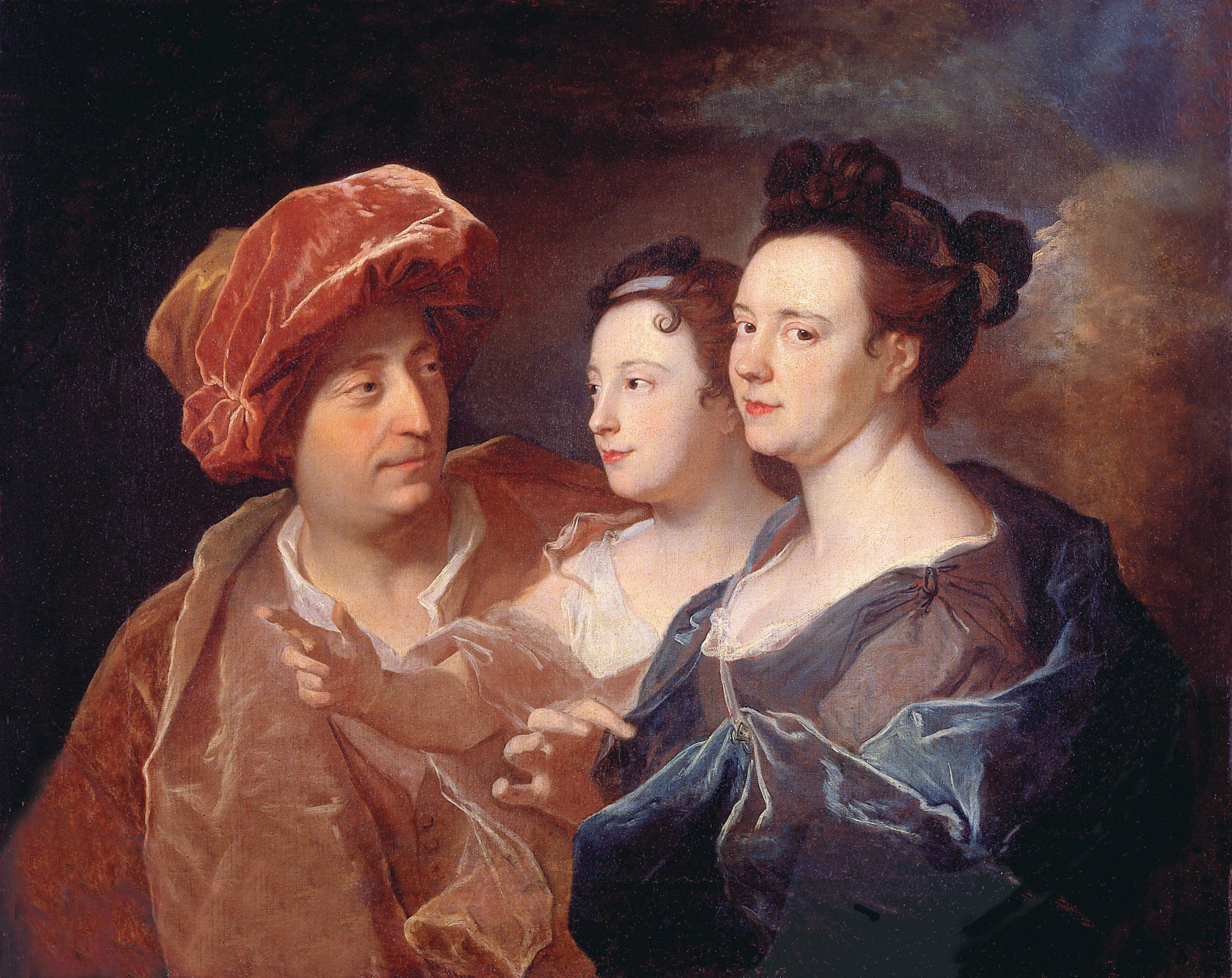
An artwork displaying the Lafitte family (Note: Jean Lafitte dit Lafita (died 1737), bailiff of Perpignan; his wife Claire-Marie-Madeleine-Géronime, the artist's sister; and their eldest daughter, Marie.)

- Portrait of Graf Philipp Ludwig Wenzel von Sinzendorf, 1712, oil on canvas, 166 cm × 132 cm (65 in × 52 in), Kunsthistorisches Museum, Vienna
- Portrait of Philippe de Courcillon, Marquis de Dangeau, 1702, oil on canvas, 162 cm × 150 cm (64 in × 59 in), Musée national du château de Versailles et des Trianons, Versailles
- Portrait of Louis XIV, 1701, oil on canvas, 279 cm × 190 cm (110 in × 75 in), Musée du Louvre, Paris
- Portrait of Louis XIV, c. 1700, oil on canvas, Centre Block, Parliament of Canada, Ottawa
- ditto, oil on canvas, 238 cm × 149 cm (94 in × 59 in), Museo del Prado, Madrid
- ditto, oil on canvas, 1694 (full shot portrait), Musée du Louvre, Paris
- ditto, oil on canvas, 1715 (full shot portrait, "State Portrait"), Musée national du château de Versailles et des Trianons, Versailles
- Portrait of the artist's mother, 1695, oil on canvas, 83 cm × 103 cm (33 in × 41 in), Musée du Louvre, Paris
- Portrait of Everhard Jabach, 1688, oil on canvas, 58.5 cm × 47 cm (23.0 in × 18.5 in), Wallraf-Richartz Museum, Cologne
- Studies of Spaniels And Whippets, And A Study of a White Headdress, oil on canvas
- Portrait of Louis Bossuet, location unknown
- Portrait of a Scholar, oil on canvas, Hermitage Museum, St Petersburg, Russia
- Portrait of Pierre Imbert Drevet, c. 1700, oil on canvas, 116 cm × 89 cm (46 in × 35 in), Musée des beaux-arts de Lyon, France
- Portrait of Louis XV at the age 5, wearing the Coronation Robes, 1715, oil on canvas, Musée national du château de Versailles et des Trianons, Versailles
- Portrait of Elizabeth Charlotte of the Palatinate, c. 1719, oil on canvas, Musée national du château de Versailles et des Trianons, Versailles
- Portrait of La comtesse de Selles Marguerite-Henriette de Labriffe, 1712, oil on canvas
- Portrait of Charles Auguste d'Allonville de Louville, Marquis de Louville, 1708, oil on canvas, private collection
- Portrait of Frederick IV of Denmark, Nationalhistoriske Museum, Frederiksborg Palace, Denmark
- Portrait of Sébastien Bourdon, drawing, 1731, 36.1 cm × 24.9 cm (14.2 in × 9.8 in), Städelsches Kunstinstitut und Städtische Galerie, Frankfurt am Main
- Portrait of Louis Antoine de Pardaillan de Gondrin, Marquis d'Antin, c. 1710
- Portrait of Augustus II the Strong, oil on canvas, 1715, Gemäldegalerie Alte Meister, Dresden
- Portrait of Martin van der Bogaert, drawing, c. 1700, 37.4 cm × 28.7 cm (14.7 in × 11.3 in), Städelsches Kunstinstitut, Frankfurt am Main
- Portrait of a young scholar, drawing, 1685, 31.4 cm × 25.5 cm (12.4 in × 10.0 in), Städelsches Kunstinstitut und Städtische Galerie, Frankfurt am Main
- Portrait of Cardinal Henri Oswald de La Tour d'Auvergne, 1732, oil on canvas, 142 cm × 113 cm (56 in × 44 in), private collection.
- Portrait of Nicolas Le Camus, drawing, c. 1701, 38.4 cm × 29.4 cm (15.1 in × 11.6 in), Städelsches Kunstinstitut und Städtische Galerie, Frankfurt am Main

== Paintings ==
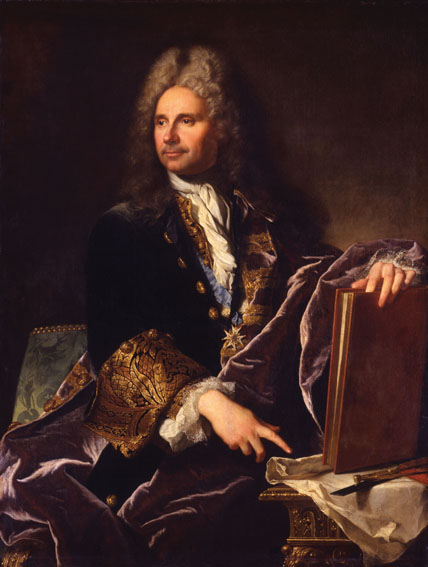
Robert de Cotte (1656-1735)

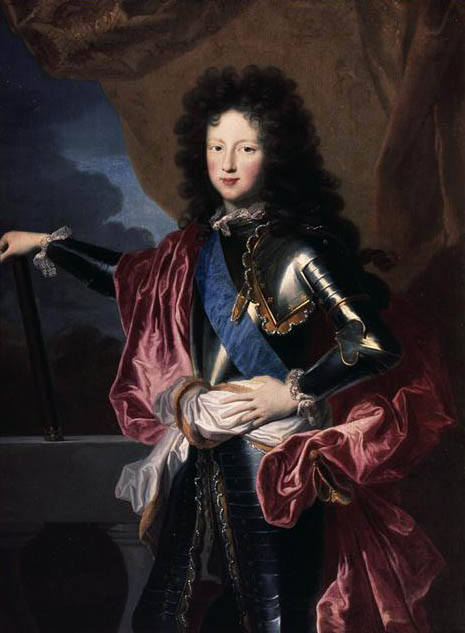
Portrait of Philippe d'Orléans, Duke of Chartres (1674–1723)

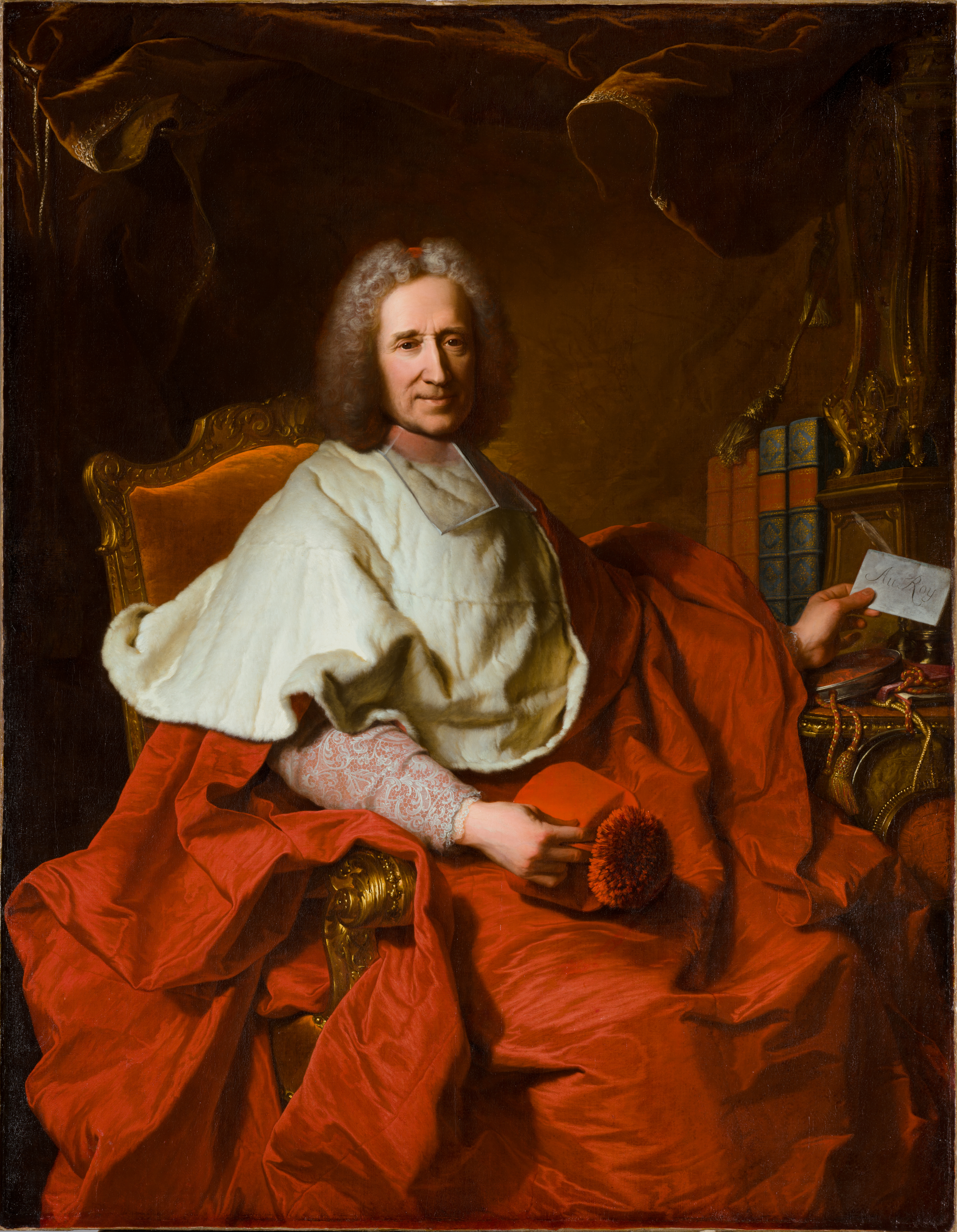
Portrait of Cardinal Dubois, 1723

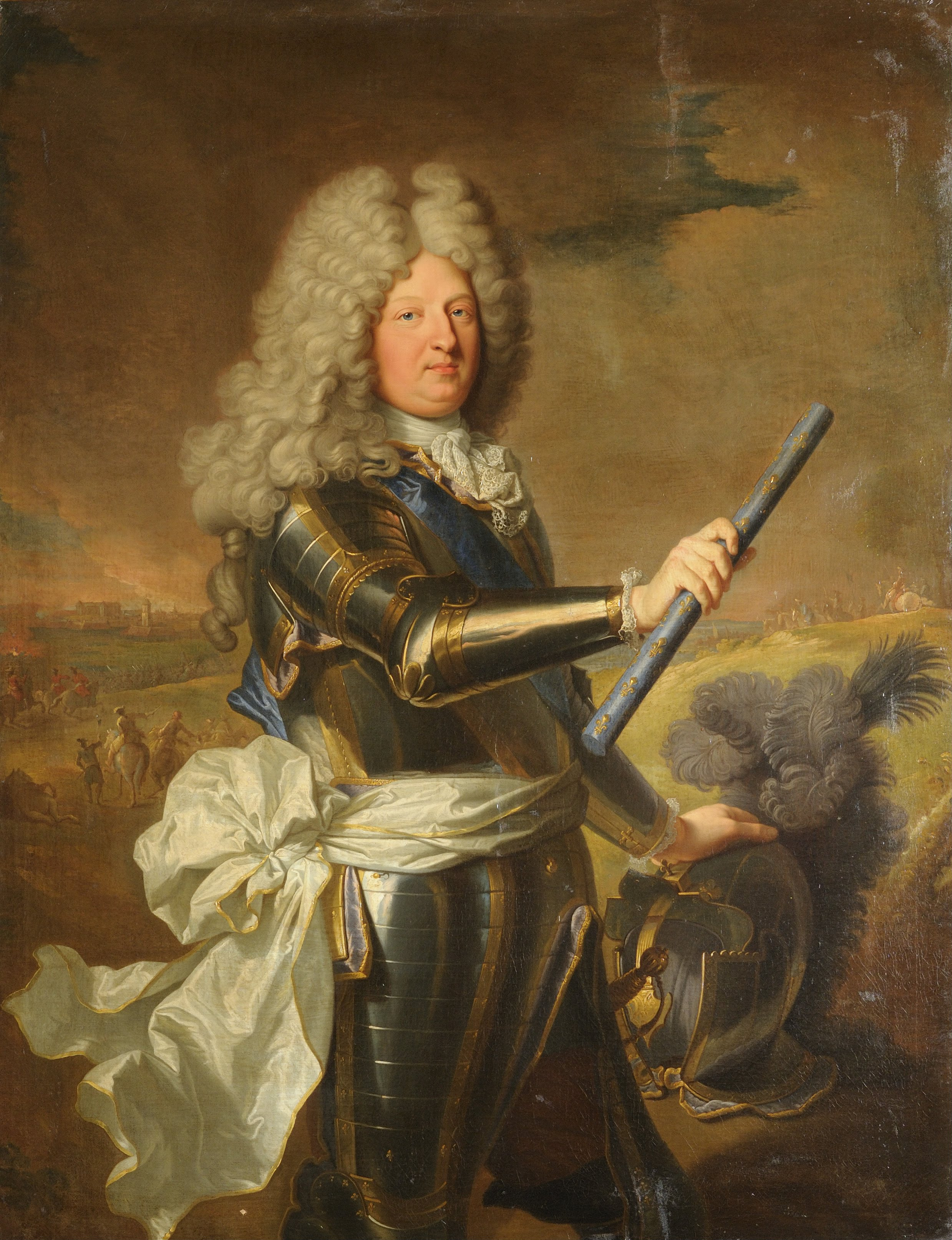
Louis of France, Dauphin (1661-1711), "Le Grand Dauphin"

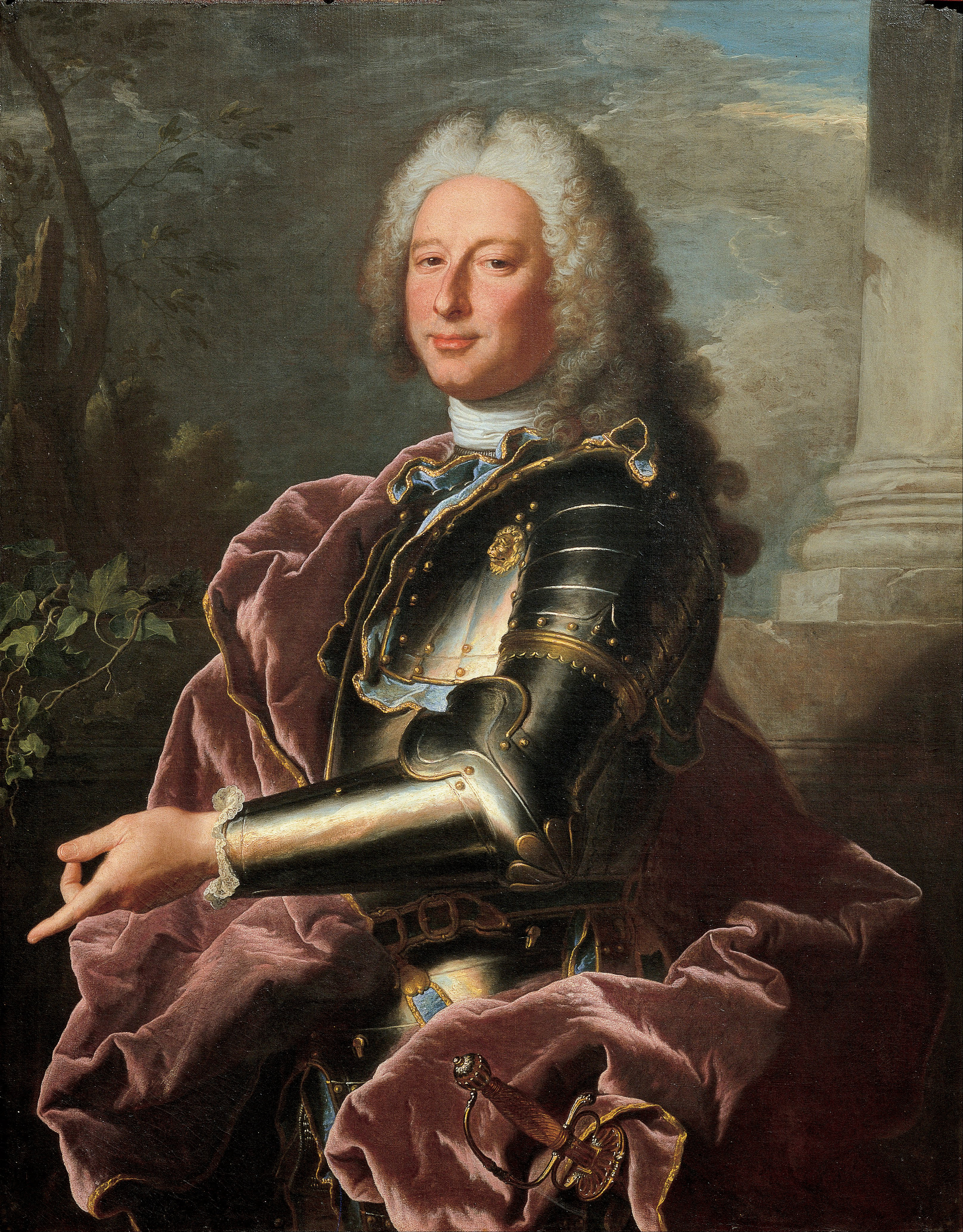
Giovanni Francesco II Brignole Sale, Doge of Genoa

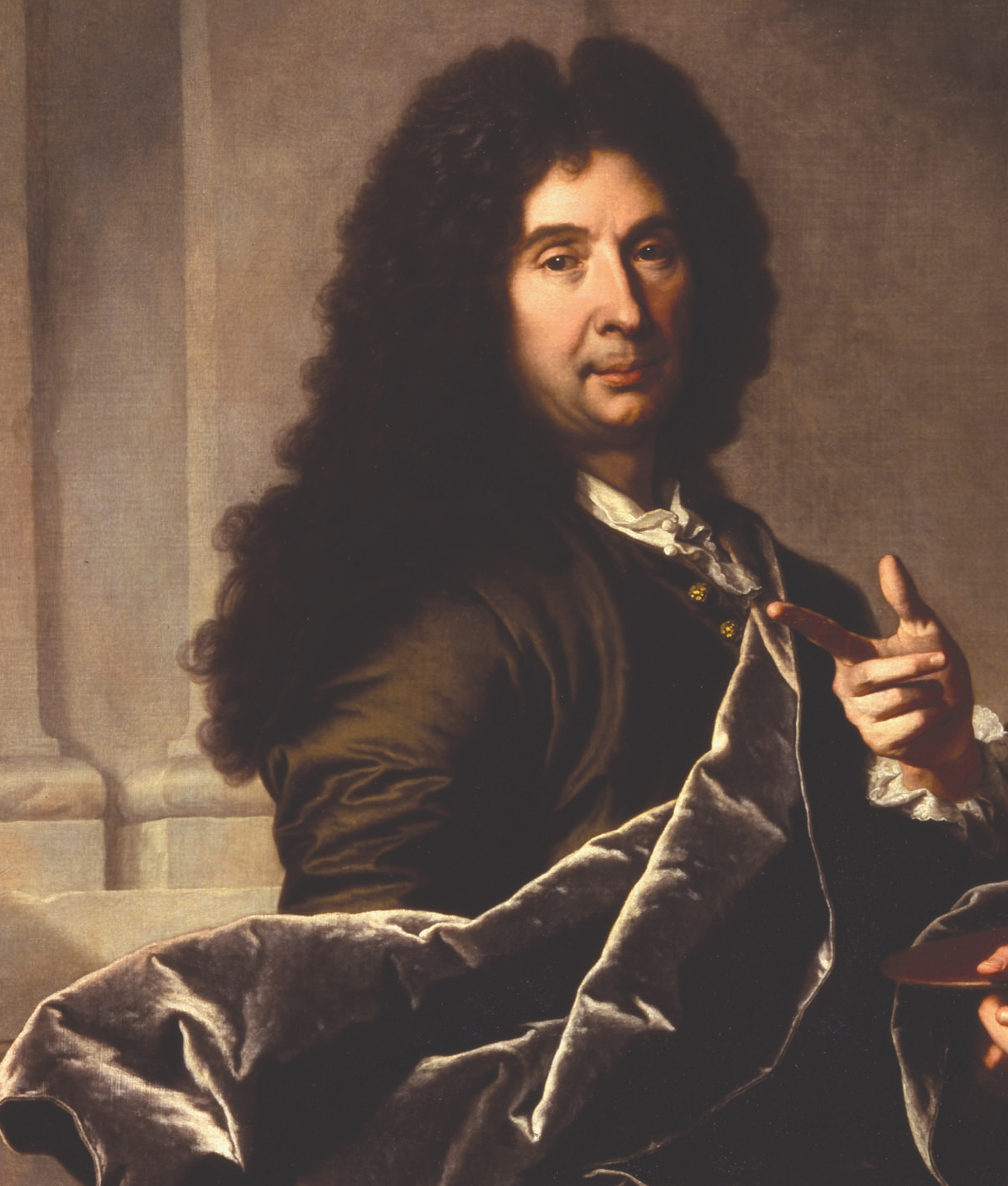
Portrait of Charles Le Brun

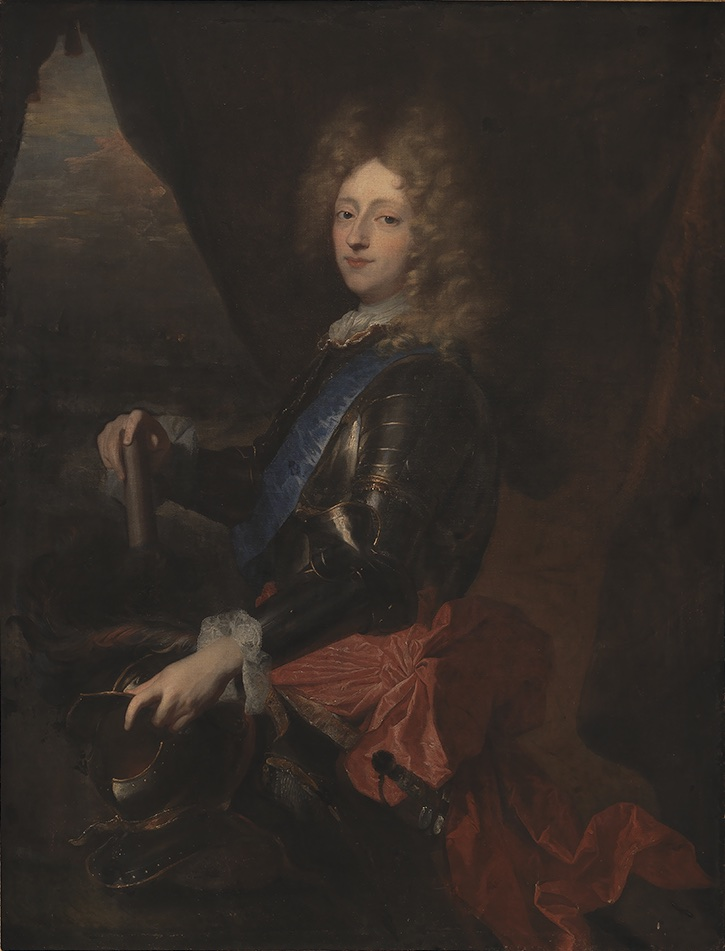
Frederick IV of Denmark as Crown Prince

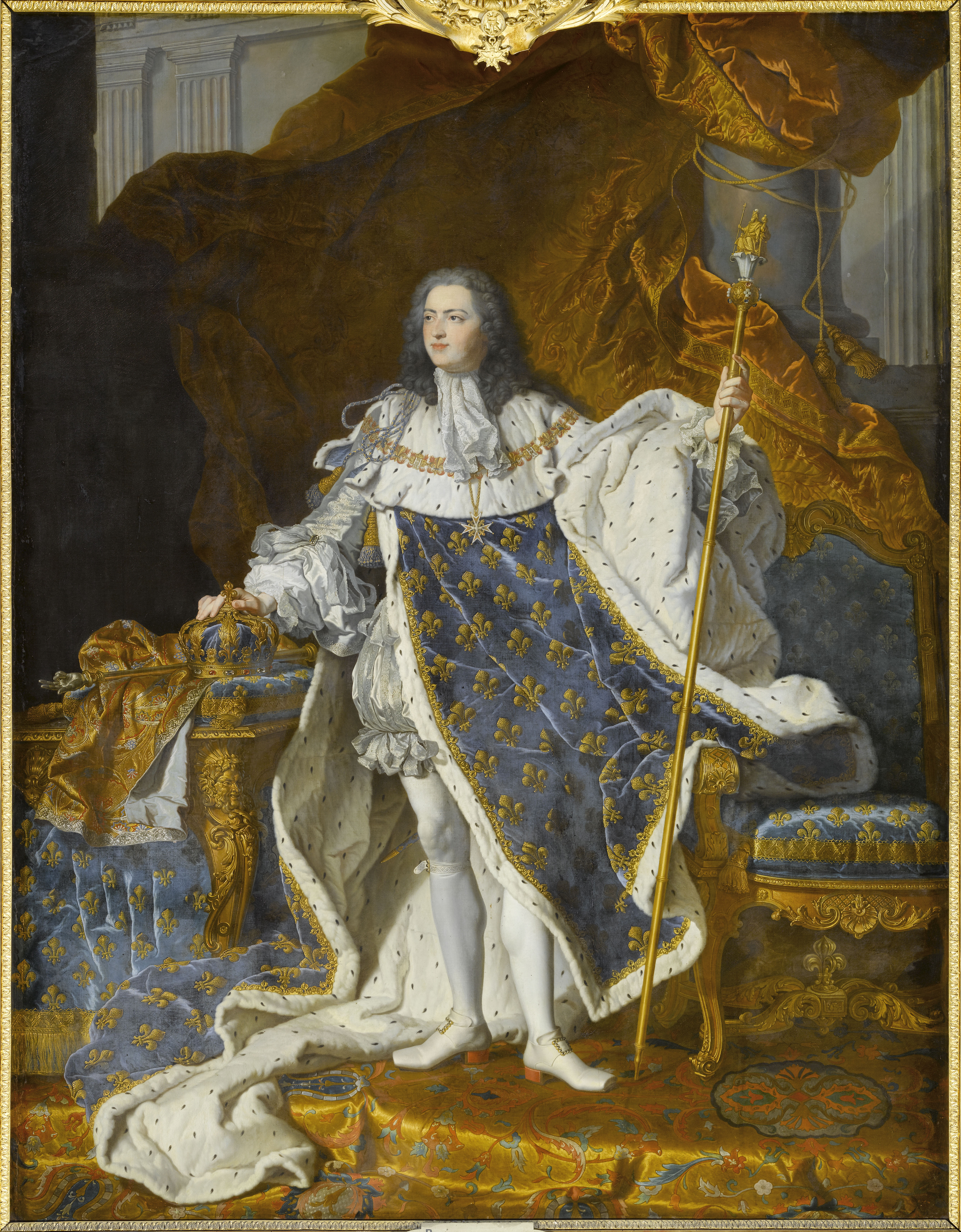
Portrait of Louis XV, (1727–1729), Versailles

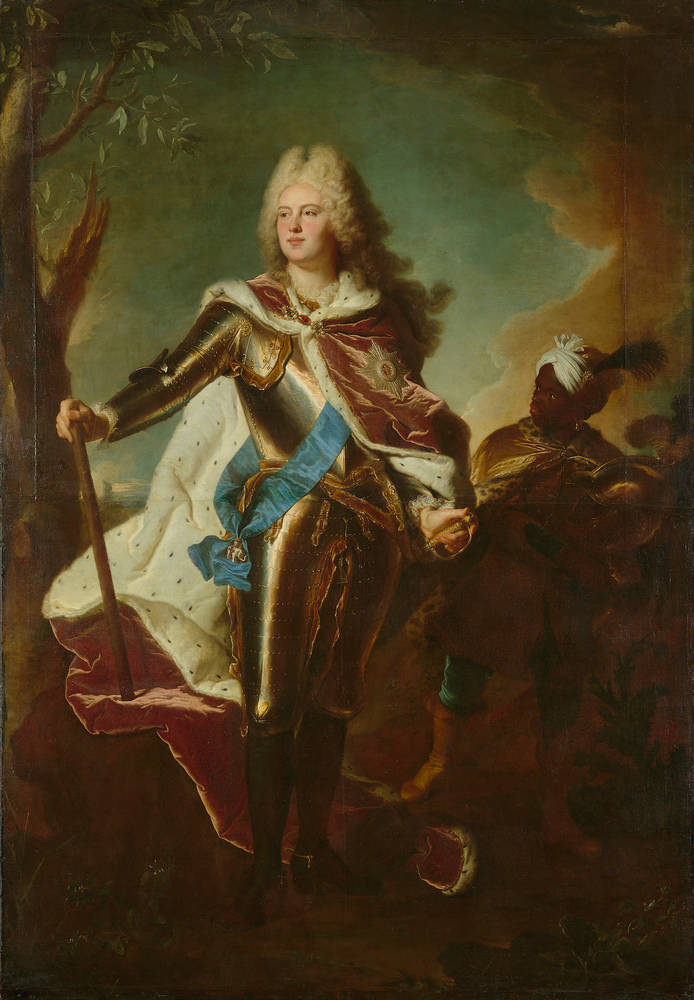
Augustus III of Poland

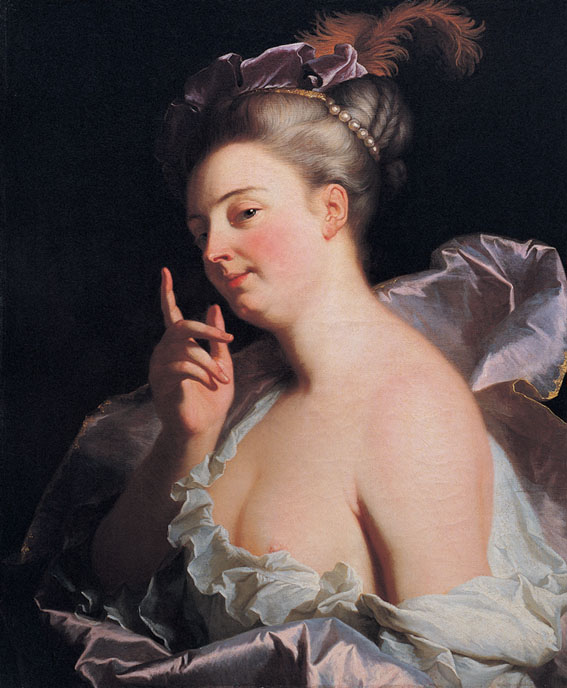
La Menasseuse

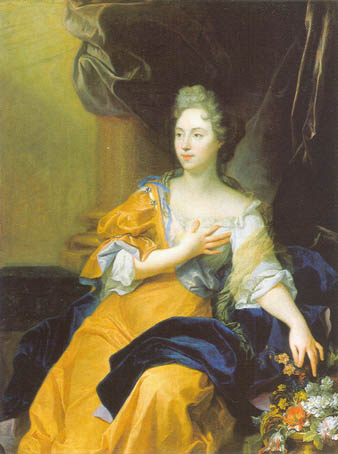
Portrait of Suzanne de Bourbers de Bernâtre

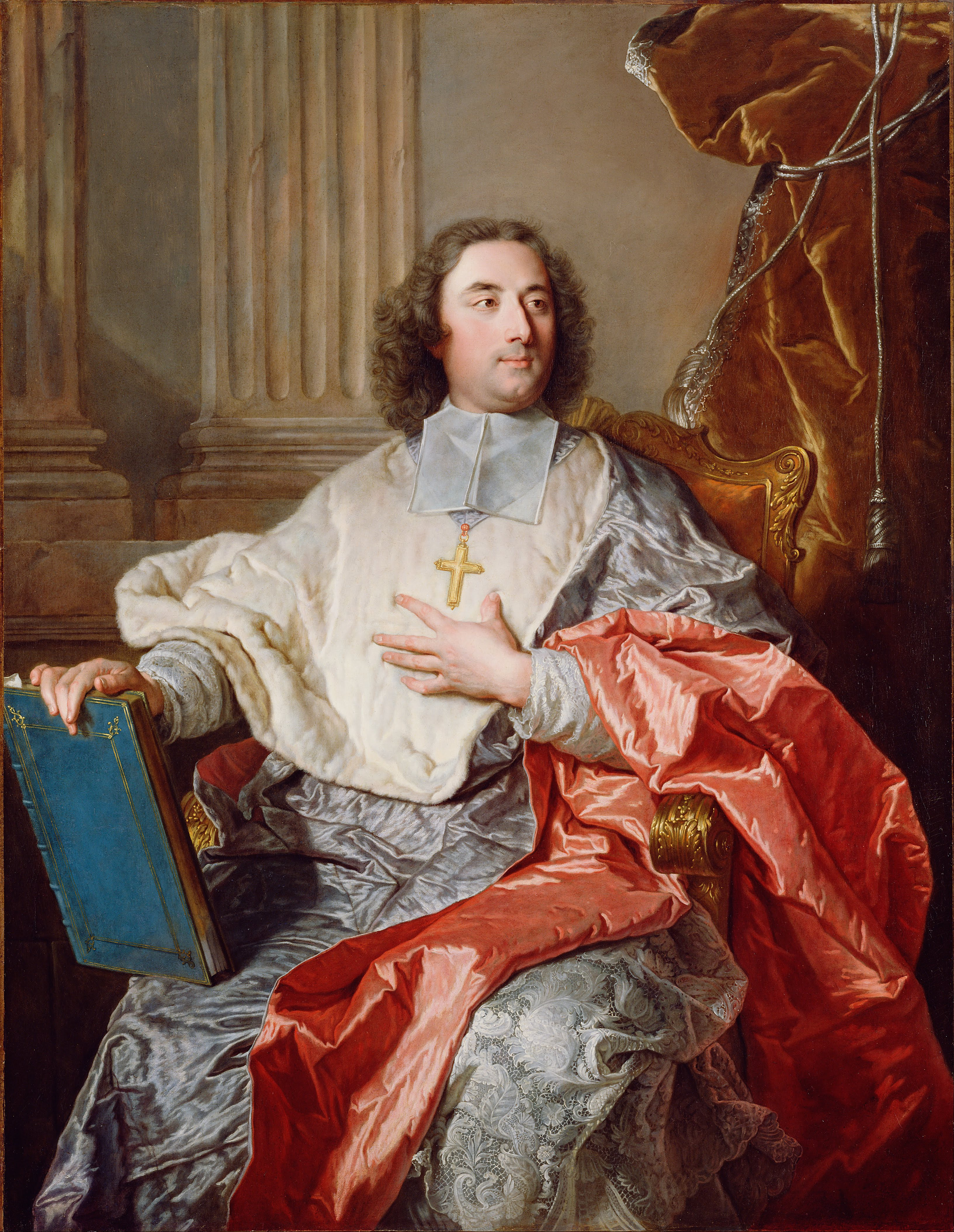
Charles de Saint-Albin, Archbishop of Cambrai

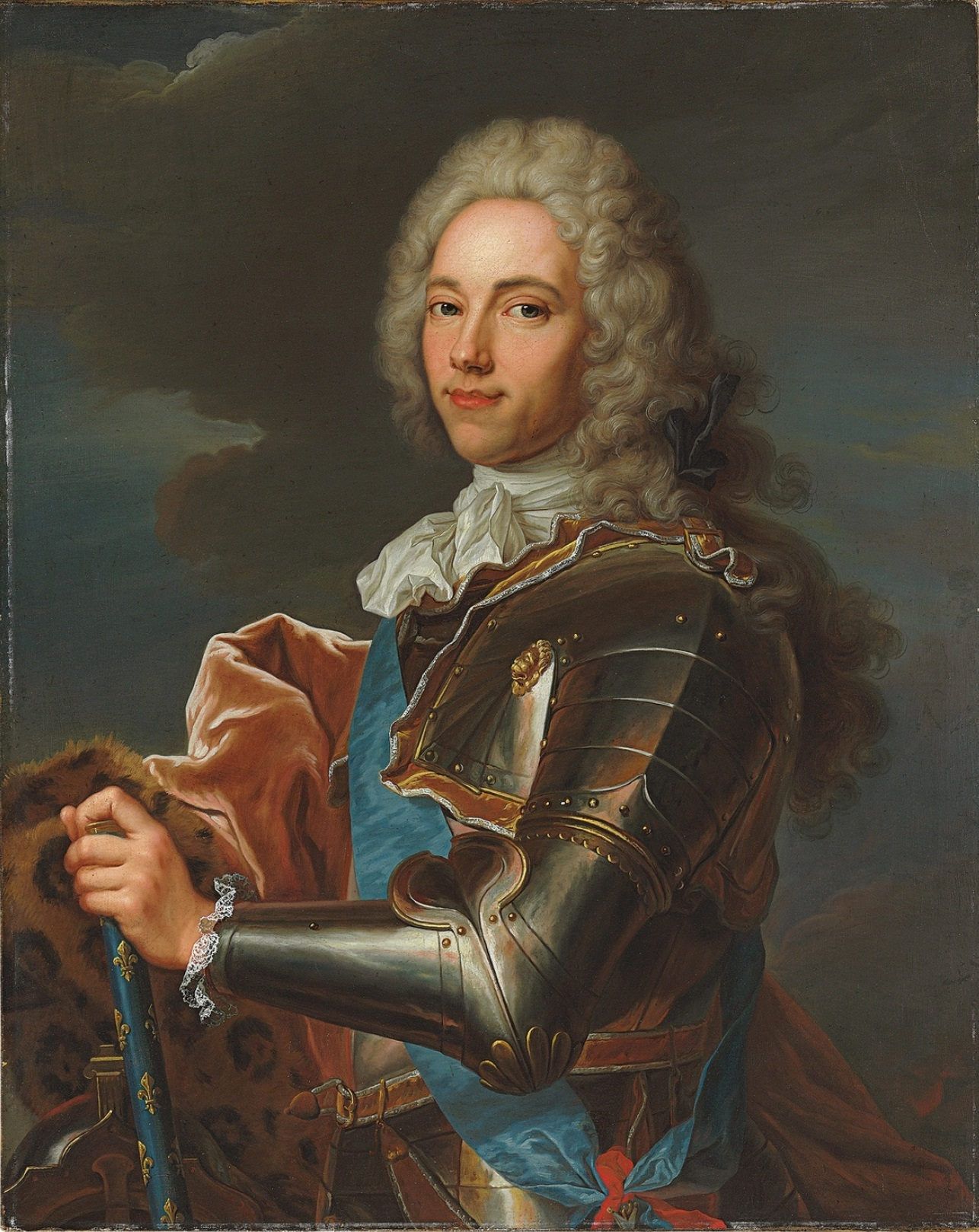
Portrait of the Duke of Broglie (1671–1745), half-length, in armor with a velvet-lined, leopard skin mantle and the Sash of the Order of Holy Spirit, the baton of a Marshal of France in his left hand

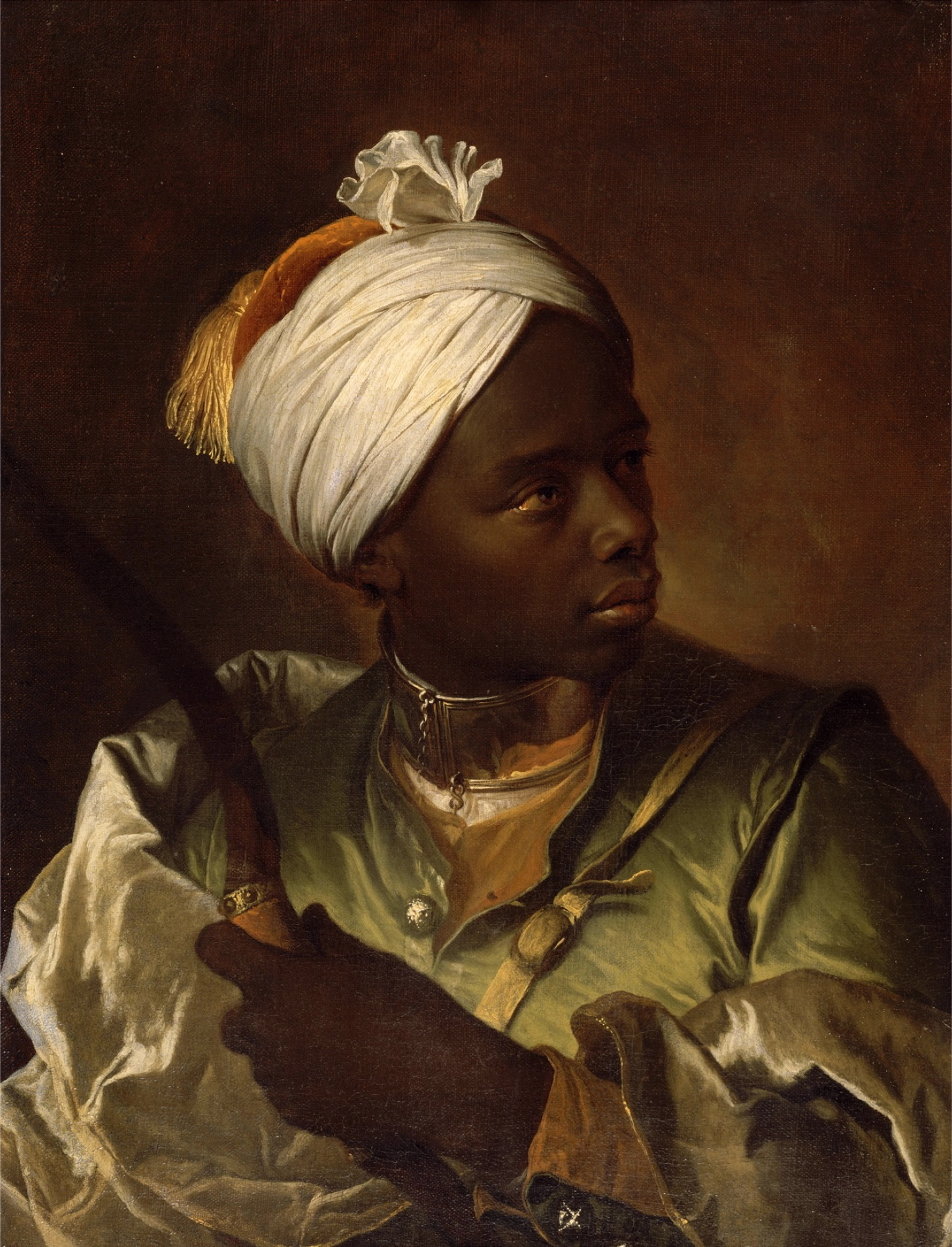
Jeune nègre tenant un arc, portrait of the black slave of the prince François-Louis de Bourbon-Conti, 1697.
