= Drevet family =

French portrait engraving family

The Drevet Family were leading portrait engravers of France for over a hundred years. Their fame began with Pierre, and was sustained by his son, Pierre-Imbert, and by his nephew, Claude.

== Pierre Drevet ==
Pierre Drevet, the Elder (1663–1738) was born at Loire in the Lyonnais, the son of Estienne Drevet, and began his studies with Germain Audran in Lyons, continuing them with Gérard Audran in Paris. His progress was rapid, and in 1696 he was made court engraver. In 1707 he was admitted to membership in the Académie des Beaux-Arts, his reception picture being an engraving of Robert de Cotte.

Hyacinthe Rigaud's portraits were in high favour at the end of the seventeenth century and Drevet was the first to encounter the difficulties of translating into black and white the natural appearance of texture and materials in the latter's oil paintings. Always engraving after oil paintings, Drevet was at times uneven, but this was arguably because the originals were uneven. His engravings were mainly the portraits of distinguished people. Among his many plates are a portrait of Jean-Baptiste Colbert (1700); portraits of Louis XIV and Louis XV, both after Rigaud; a Crucifixion, after Coypel, and a portrait of Charles II of England. During the last years of his life Drevet worked with his son and they produced plates together. He died in Paris.

== Pierre-Imbert Drevet ==
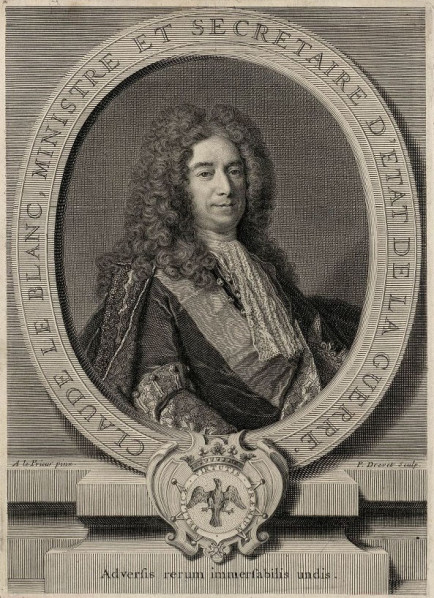
Claude le Blanc, by the Younger Pierre

Pierre-Imbert Drevet (22 June 1697 – 27 April 1739), called the Younger Pierre, was born and died in Paris. His father, the elder Drevet, instructed him, and he was engraving at the age of thirteen. At first he engraved after Charles Lebrun, but he soon developed a style of his own. He was his father's constant companion. In 1723 Pierre-Imbert finished his portrait of Bossuet after Rigaud. In 1724 the portrait of Cardinal Dubois was engraved; in 1730, a plate of Adrienne Lecouvreur. For his engraving of Samuel Bernard, Rigaud himself made the drawing, an unusual event in eighteenth-century engraving. Besides his portraits, Pierre-Imbert produced many religious and historical plates, chiefly of Coypel. A sunstroke (1726) resulted in intermittent mental disability, which continued for thirteen years until his death. He kept on engraving until the end. He was a member of the Académie de Peinture and the king assigned him apartments in the Louvre. Among his pupils were artists François and Jacques Chéreau and Simon Vallée.

His principal works were: Presentation of the Virgin, after Le Brun; Presentation in the Temple, after L. Boullogne; portraits of the Archbishop of Cambrai (after Joseph Vivien); and René Pucelle, his last work, after Rigaud.

== Claude Drevet ==
A French engraver, b. Lyons, 1705; d. in Paris, 1782. He was a nephew and pupil of Pierre the Elder and at first followed the traditions of the two Pierres, forming about him a coterie of engravers who endeavoured to keep alive their traditions. When Pierre-Imbert died, his rooms in the Louvre were given to Claude, who reportedly proceeded to squander nearly all the money left him by his uncle and his cousin. He engraved portraits of Henri Oswald, Cardinal d'Auvergne, after Rigaud, and of Charles-Gaspard-Guillaume de Vintimille du Luc, Archbishop of Paris, also after Rigaud.

== Sources ==
Attribution

The entry cites:

- Ambroise Firmin-Didot, Les Drevet (Paris, 1876)
- Friedrich Lippmann, Engraving and Etching (New York, 1906);
- Jacques Pernetti, Les Lyonnais dignes de mémoire, II, 139.
