= Étienne-Hubert de Cambacérès =

His Eminence Étienne-Hubert de Cambacérès
- Cardinal Archbishop of Rouen
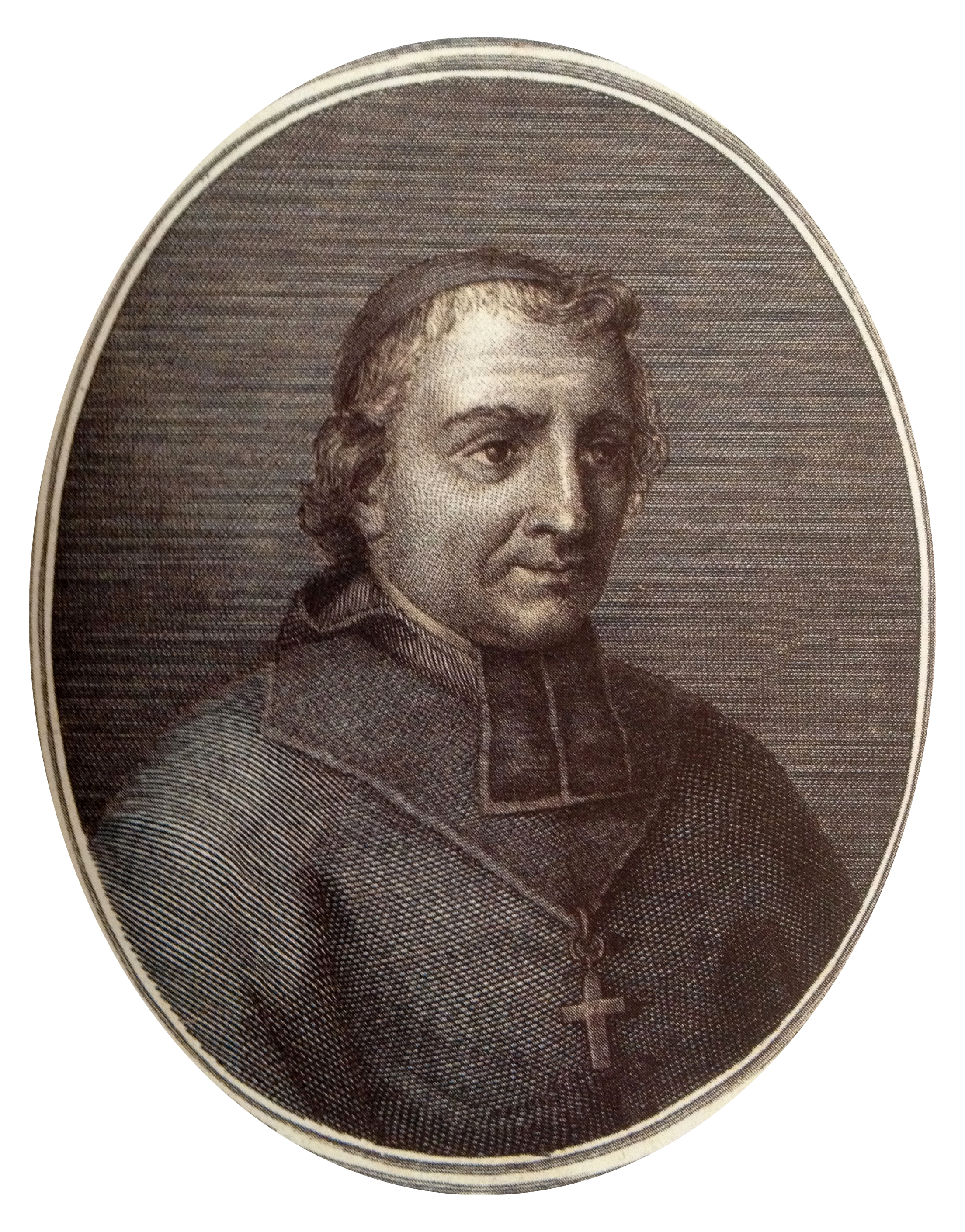
- Engraving of Étienne-Hubert de Cambacérès
- Church: Roman Catholic Church
- Archdiocese: Rouen
- See: Rouen
- Appointed: 1802
- Term ended: 1818
- Predecessor: Dominique de La Rochefoucauld
- Successor: François de Pierre de Bernis

Orders
- Ordination: 1780
- Consecration: 9 April 1802 by Giovanni Battista Caprara Montecuccoli
- Created cardinal: San Stefano al Monte Celio by Pope Pius VII
- Rank: Cardinal-Priest

Personal details
- Born: Étienne-Hubert de Cambacérès; 11 September 1756 Montpellier, Languedoc, Kingdom of France
- Died: 25 October 1818 (aged 62) Rouen, France
- Buried: Rouen Cathedral
- Denomination: Catholic
- Parents: Jean Antoine de Cambacérès and Marie Rose Vassal
- Coat of arms

Étienne-Hubert de Cambacérès (French: [etjɛn ybɛʁ də kɑ̃baseʁɛs]; 11 September 1756 – 25 October 1818) was a French Catholic Cardinal and Archbishop of Rouen. A notable clergyman during the Napoleonic era, he was also a Senator under the First Empire.

== Family ==
Cambacérès was born in Montpellier, the son of Jean Antoine de Cambacérès, a counselor of the Court of Accounts, and his first wife, Marie Rose Vassal. His elder brother was Jean-Jacques-Régis de Cambacérès, Archchancellor of the French Empire, while another brother, Jean-Pierre-Hugues Cambacérès, was a baron and general under the Empire.

== Early life and education ==
Cambacérès entered religious life by vocation. In 1763, he joined the Confraternity of White Penitents in Montpellier and later became its prior in 1804. He studied at the seminary in Avignon and earned a license in canon and civil law (in utroque) from the University of Montpellier in 1777. With the help of his uncle, the vicar general of Bourges, Cambacérès obtained a canonry in Montpellier. By 1789, he served as a canon and vicar general in the Diocese of Alès. He was ordained a priest in 1780 in Montpellier.

Despite the turmoil of the French Revolution, Cambacérès avoided persecution by abstaining from political engagement and maintaining loyalty to his ecclesiastical duties. He refused the Civil Constitution of the Clergy in 1790 but pledged allegiance to the laws of the Republic in 1792. With his brother’s influence, he was spared exile and continued his quiet life in Montpellier.

== Archbishop of Rouen and cardinal ==
In November 1801, Cambacérès joined his brother in Paris. He was appointed Archbishop of Rouen on 9 April 1802 and consecrated at Notre-Dame Cathedral in Paris by Cardinal Giovanni Battista Caprara. Cambacérès reorganized the diocesan administration, reopened seminaries, and reestablished parishes in Rouen. He was instrumental in restoring ecclesiastical infrastructure after the Revolution.

On 17 January 1803, Pope Pius VII made Cambacérès a cardinal-priest with the title of San Stefano al Monte Celio. During the pope’s visit to France in 1804, Cambacérès was part of the delegation accompanying him. However, he later distanced himself from Napoleon’s policies, notably refusing to attend the emperor’s second marriage due to its conflict with Church teachings on divorce.

Cambacérès was also a member of the Legion of Honour, receiving distinctions as a Grand Officer and later as a Grand Eagle. Napoleon appointed him to the Senate in 1805, and he was made a count of the Empire in 1808.

== Later years and death ==
In April 1814, Cambacérès supported the Bourbon Restoration but abstained from political activities during the Hundred Days. He remained Archbishop of Rouen until his death on 25 October 1818. He was buried in Rouen Cathedral, near the mausoleum of the cardinals of Amboise.

== Episcopal lineage ==
Cambacérès’s episcopal lineage traces back to Cardinal Scipione Rebiba through Giovanni Battista Caprara and other notable prelates.
