= Charles-François Lebrun =

French nobleman, lawyer and statesman (1739–1824)

Charles-François Lebrun Duc de Plaisance
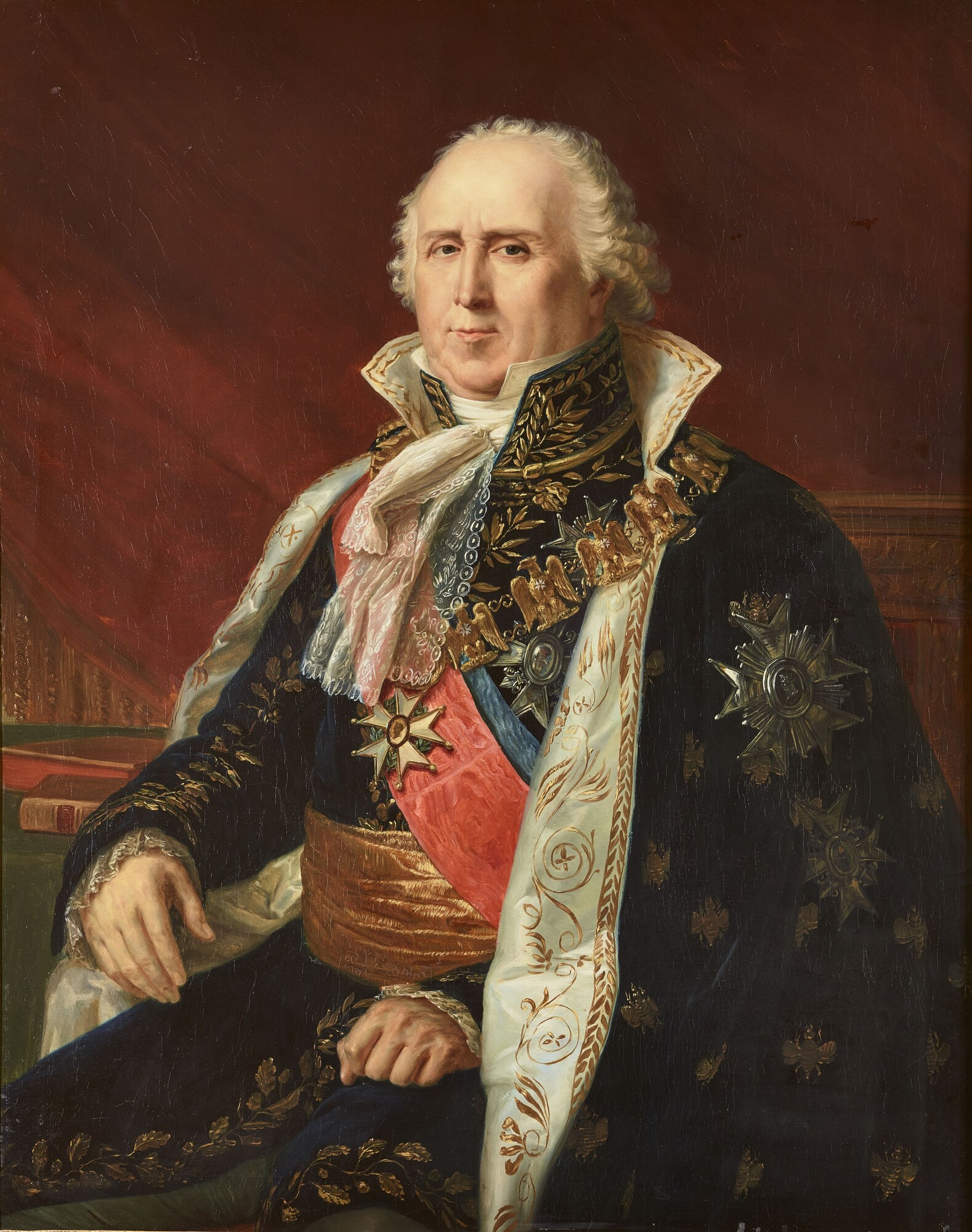
- Portrait by Robert Lefèvre, 1807

Third Consul of France
- In office 12 December 1799 – 18 May 1804 Serving with Napoléon Bonaparte and Jean-Jacques-Régis de Cambacérès
- Preceded by: Roger Ducos (as Provisional Consul)
- Succeeded by: Republic abolished

Member of the Council of Five Hundred
- In office 22 August 1795 – 9 November 1799

Member of the National Constituent Assembly
- In office 9 July 1789 – 30 September 1791

Member of the Estates General for the Third Estate
- In office 6 May 1789 – 6 June 1789
- Constituency: Dourdan

Personal details
- Born: 19 March 1739 Saint-Sauveur-Lendelin, Normandy, Kingdom of France
- Died: 16 June 1824 (aged 85) Sainte-Mesme, Yvelines, Kingdom of France
- Resting place: Père Lachaise Cemetery
- Spouse: Anne Delagoutte
- Children: Anne-Charles Lebrun, 2nd duc de Plaisance; Alexander Lebrun; Sophie-Eugenie Lebrun; Auguste-Charles Lebrun; Dorothée Lebrun

Charles-François Lebrun, 1st duc de Plaisance (French: [ʃaʁl fʁɑ̃swa ləbʁœ̃], 19 March 1739 – 16 June 1824) was a French statesman who served as Third Consul of the French Republic and was later created Arch-Treasurer by Napoleon I.

== Biography ==
=== Ancien Régime ===
Born in Saint-Sauveur-Lendelin (Manche), after studies of philosophy at the Collège de Navarre, he started his career during the Ancien Régime, making his first appearance as a lawyer in Paris in 1762. He filled the posts of censeur du Roi (1766) and then Inspector General of the Domains of the Crown (1768).

During the early 1760s, Lebrun became a disciple of Montesquieu and an admirer of the British Constitution, travelling through Southern Netherlands, the Dutch Republic, and finally to the Kingdom of Great Britain (where he witnessed the debates in the London Parliament).

He became one of Chancellor René Nicolas de Maupéou's chief advisers, taking part in his struggle against the parlements and sharing his downfall in 1774. Lebrun then devoted himself to literature, translating Torquato Tasso's Jerusalem Delivered (1774) and the Iliad (1776). He retreated from public life to his property in Grillon, attempting to live a life as envisaged by the philosophe Jean-Jacques Rousseau. During the cabinet of Jacques Necker, he was consulted on several occasions, but never appointed to high office.

=== Constituent Assembly and provincial politics ===
At the outbreak of the French Revolution in 1789, he foresaw its importance in his volume La voix du Citoyen, published the same year, and predicted the course which events would take. In the Estates-General and (after he took the Tennis Court Oath) in the National Constituent Assembly, where he sat as deputy for the Third Estate in the bailiwick of Dourdan, he professed Liberalism and proposed various financial laws, without affiliating to any particular faction. A partisan of constitutional monarchy even after King Louis XVI's flight to Varennes (June 1791), he became the target for the suspicions of the Jacobin Club.

After the voting of the 1791 Constitution, he was ineligible for the Legislative Assembly (like all former members of the Constituent Assembly), and became instead president of the directory of Seine-et-Oise département.

Lebrun retired from this position on 7 August 1792, and again retired to Dourdan. Three days later, the storming of the Tuileries Palace signalled the move towards the establishment of the French Republic by the creation of the National Convention. Lebrun further aroused the indignation of republicans when he accepted to represent Dourdan in the electoral college of Seine-et-Oise which nominated deputies to the Convention.

=== Terror, Thermidor, and Directory ===
A suspect during the Reign of Terror, he was twice arrested: the first time in September 1793, liberated after the intervention of Joseph Augustin Crassous (representative on mission to Seine-et-Oise); the second time in June 1794 (paradoxically, on orders from the same Crassous) – threatened with the guillotine, he was saved by a relative of his who stole his record of prosecution, thus causing a delay long enough for Lebrun to be saved by the Thermidorian Reaction.

In 1795, Lebrun was elected as a deputy to the French Directory's Council of Ancients and, although a supporter of the House of Bourbon, he voted against prosecutions of Jacobins, and showed himself in favour of national reconciliation.

=== Consulate, Empire, and Restoration ===
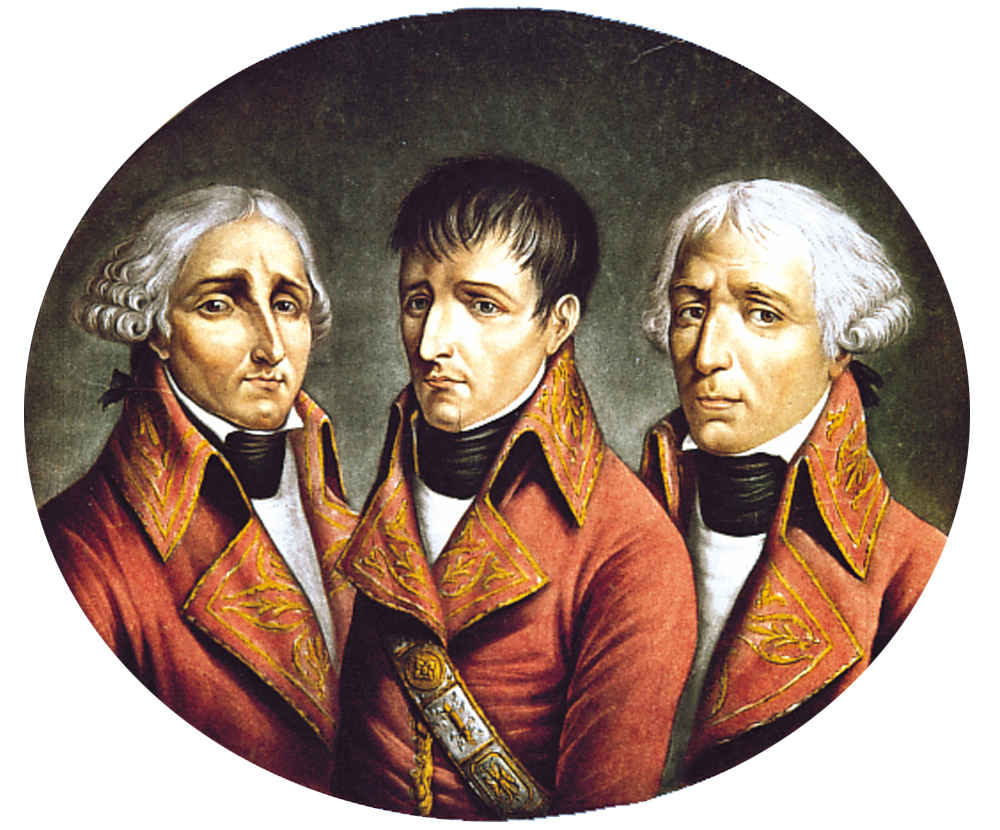
The Three Consuls (Lebrun, right)

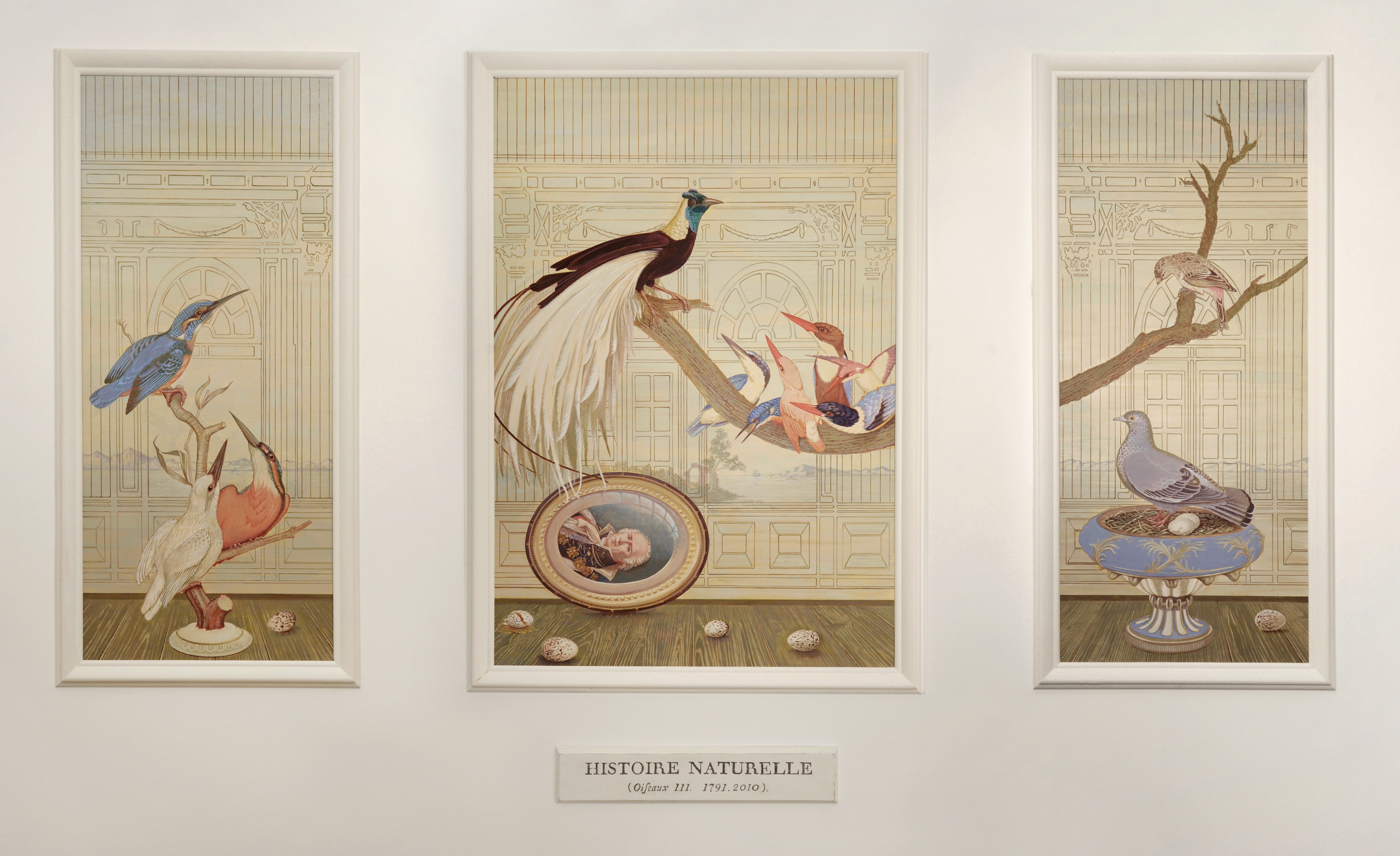
Histoire Naturelle, 1810 – one of the paintings recently installed in the entrance of Herengracht 40 in Amsterdam, this one with the portrait of Charles-François LeBrun, Napoleon's governor of the Netherlands

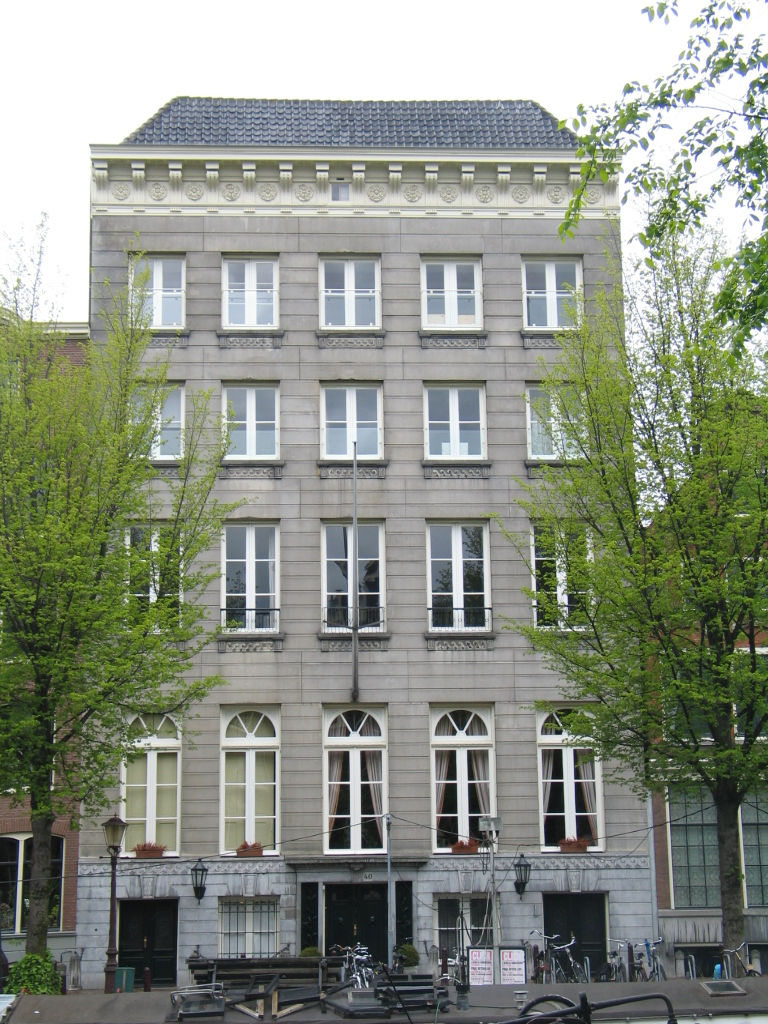
Mansion of Lebrun on Herengracht 40, Amsterdam

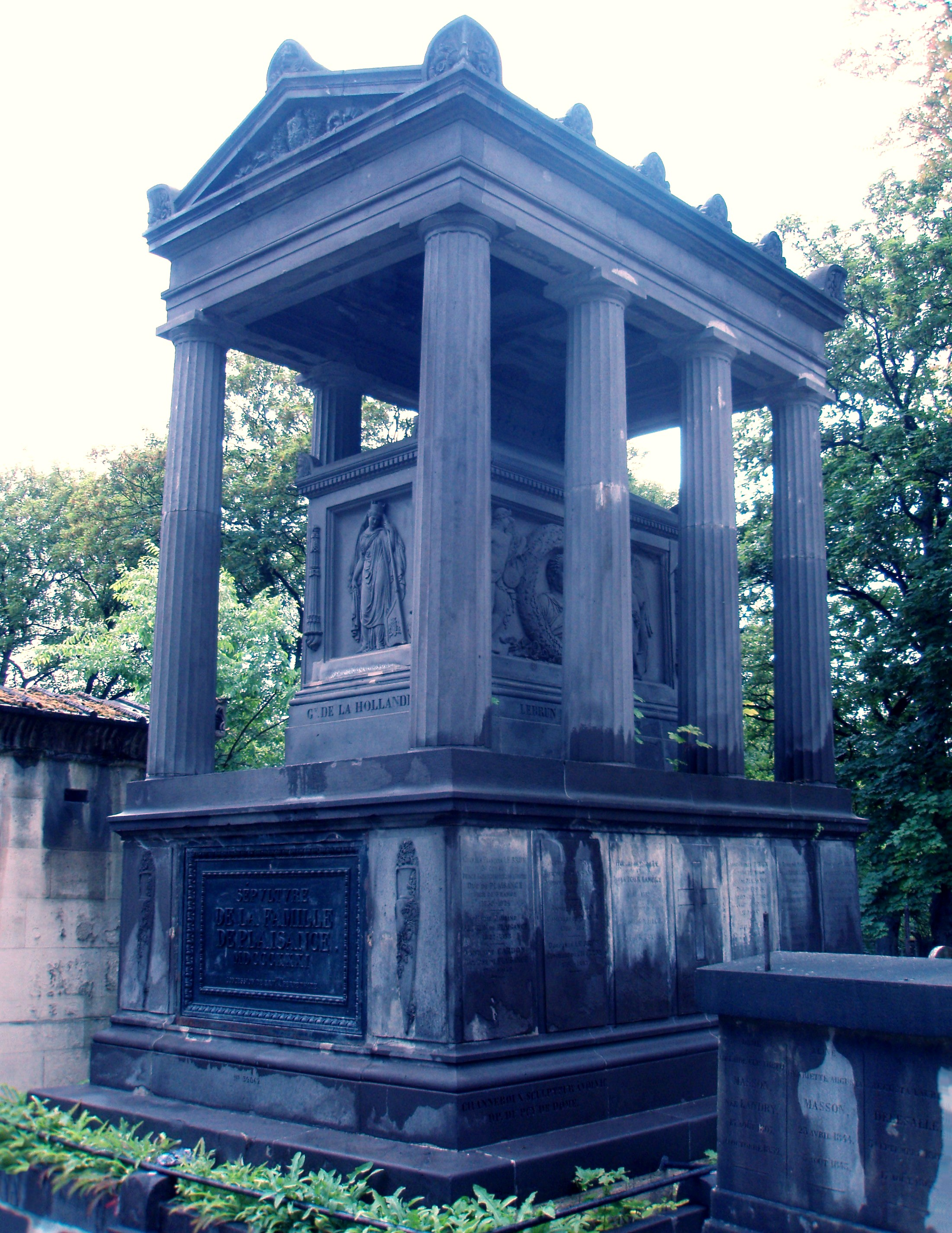
Tomb of Charles-François Lebrun

Lebrun was made Third Consul following Napoleon Bonaparte's 18 Brumaire coup in the Year VIII (9–10 November 1799; see French Consulate). In this capacity, he took an active part in Napoleon's reorganization of the national finances and in the administration of France's départements. He was made a member of the Académie des Inscriptions et Belles-Lettres in 1803, and in 1804, he was appointed Arch-Treasurer of the French Empire. From 1805 to 1806, he was governor-general of Liguria, during which time he completed its annexation by France.

He opposed Napoleon's restoration of the noblesse and, in 1808, only reluctantly accepted the title of duc de Plaisance (Duke of Piacenza), a rare, nominal, but hereditary duché grand-fief, extinguished in 1926. From 1811 to 1813, he served as governor-general of a part of the annexed Netherlands, reorganizing its départements – Zuyderzée and Bouches-de-la-Meuse. He was assisted by Antoine de Celles and Goswin de Stassart.

Although to a certain extent opposed to the autocracy of the Emperor, he was not in favor of his deposition, although he accepted the fait accompli of the Bourbon Restoration in April 1814. Louis XVIII made him a Peer of France, but during the subsequent Hundred Days, he accepted from Napoleon the post of grand maître de l'Université. As a consequence, he was suspended from the House of Peers when the Bourbons returned again in 1815, but was recalled in 1819. He died five years later in Sainte-Mesme (then in Seine-et-Oise, now in Yvelines).

== Notes ==
French nobility
Preceded by Title Created	Duc de Plaisance; 1808–1824	Succeeded by Anne-Charles Lebrun
Political offices
Preceded by Roger Ducos	Third Consul of the French Republic; 1799 - 1804; Served alongside: Napoleon Bonaparte (First Consul); Jean Jacques Régis de Cambacérès (Second Consul)	Succeeded by Office abolished
