= Dominique de La Rochefoucauld =

French bishop and cardinal

His Eminence Dominique de La Rochefoucauld COHS
- Cardinal, Archbishop of Rouen, Primate of Normandy
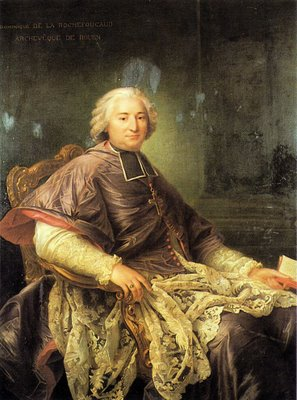
- Portrait by François-Hubert Drouais
- Church: Roman Catholic Church
- Archdiocese: Rouen
- See: Notre-Dame de Rouen
- Installed: 2 June 1759
- Term ended: 23 September 1800
- Predecessor: Nicolas II de Saulx-Tavannes
- Successor: Étienne Hubert de Cambacérès
- Other posts: Archbishop of Albi; Vicar-General of Bourges

Personal details
- Born: 26 September 1712 Saint-Ilpize, Auvergne, France
- Died: 23 September 1800 (aged 87) Prince-Bishopric of Münster, Holy Roman Empire
- Education: Saint-Sulpice Seminary, Paris; Seminary of Clermont

Deputy to the Estates General for the First Estate
- Constituency: Rouen

Dominique de La Rochefoucauld (Saint-Ilpize, Haute-Loire, 26 September 1712 – Münster, Germany, 23 September 1800) was a French bishop and cardinal.

== Life ==
=== Before the French Revolution ===
He was from an impoverished branch of the La Rochefoucauld family. He became archbishop of Albi in 1747, and archbishop of Rouen in 1759.

=== Under the Revolution ===
The clergy of Rouen sent him as their deputy to the États généraux of 1789. As President of the chamber of clergy, he refused its union with the Third Estate. He had to submit, given a direct order from Louis XVI. In protest he submitted a list of clerical rights.

He led a fierce opposition to the Constitution, and signed the protest of 12 September 1791. After 10 August 1792 he went into exile, in Germany from 1794.

He joined the Société des amis des noirs.

== Bibliography ==
- Fisquet, Honoré (1864). La France pontificale (Gallia Christiana): Metropole de Rouen: Rouen (in French). Paris: Etienne Repos. pp. 268–275.
- Loth, Julien (1893). Histoire du cardinal de la Rochefoucauld et du diocèse de Rouen pendant la Révolution (in French). Evreux: l'Eure. p. 743.

Catholic Church titles
Preceded by Frédéric Jérôme de La Rochefoucauld	Abbot of Cluny; 1757-1790	Succeeded by Abolished
