= Château de Saint-Ilpize =

Castle in France

Coordinates: 45°11′40″N 3°23′18″E

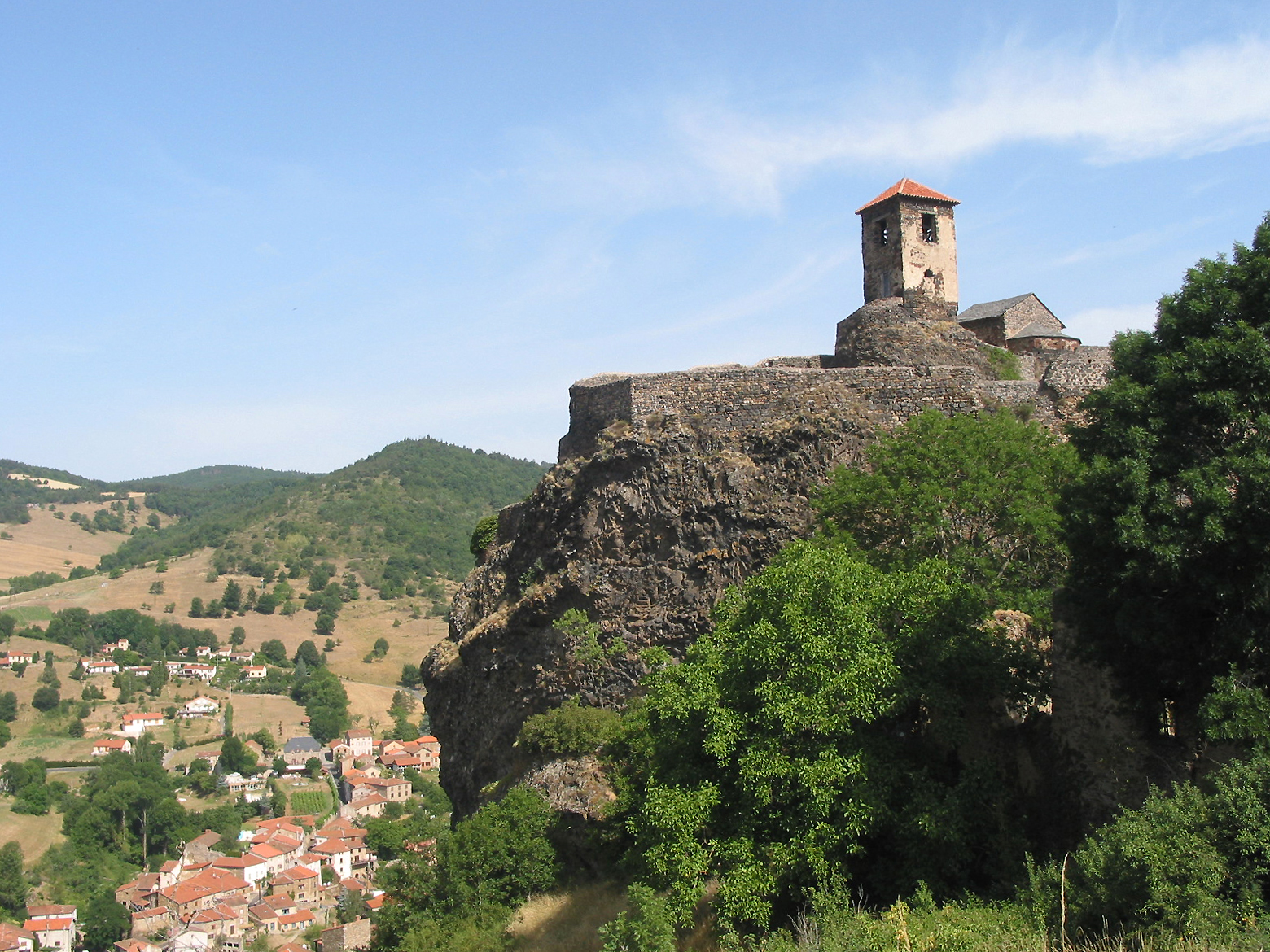
Saint-Ilpize, the medieval castle

The Château de Saint-Ilpize is a ruined castle in the commune of Saint-Ilpize in the Haute-Loire département of France. The medieval town of Saint-Ilpize clings to a basalt rock on which stands the castle. Within the castle's walls is a 14th-century chapel built of polychromatic tufa; a basalt gable wall houses the church bells.

== History ==
The first recorded mention of a fortified construction is from 1030; the castle was modified in the 14th and 16th centuries. The chapel dates from the 12th century. The castle was the property of the Dauphins of Auvergne. With rapidly added enceintes, the Dauphins of Auvergne were able to control the Allier river gorges.

In the Middle Ages the castle was an important châtelain, Saint-Ilpize being one of the treize bonnes villes d'Auvergne (thirteen good towns of Auvergne) which had supported Charles VII during the Praguerie revolt of 1440.

In 1424, Blanche Dauphine, inheritor of the manor, married Jean de Lespinasse. In 1480, the property passed to the house of Amboise, and, in the 16th century, to the house of Rochefoucauld-Langeac.

The castle and the chapel have been listed since 1907 as a monument historique by the French Ministry of Culture.

== Description ==
The curtain walls are dominated by the former chapel and a square tower which now serves as a bell tower. Successive enceintes, flanked with towers, surrounded the lower courtyards and sections of the town which, by the 16th century, extended as far as the banks of the Allier. Only the uppermost enceinte, which protected the manor house, still appears as a solid structure at the summit of the hill. The roughly circular enceinte, made up of irregular stretches of wall, is accessed by a ramp leading from the church. Several chicanes, bastions and posterns defended the access to the lower courtyard which was reached through an arched gateway, now destroyed.

== See also ==
- List of castles in France
