= Jean-Jacques-Régis de Cambacérès =

French lawyer and statesman (1753–1824)

Jean-Jacques-Régis de Cambacérès Duke of Parma
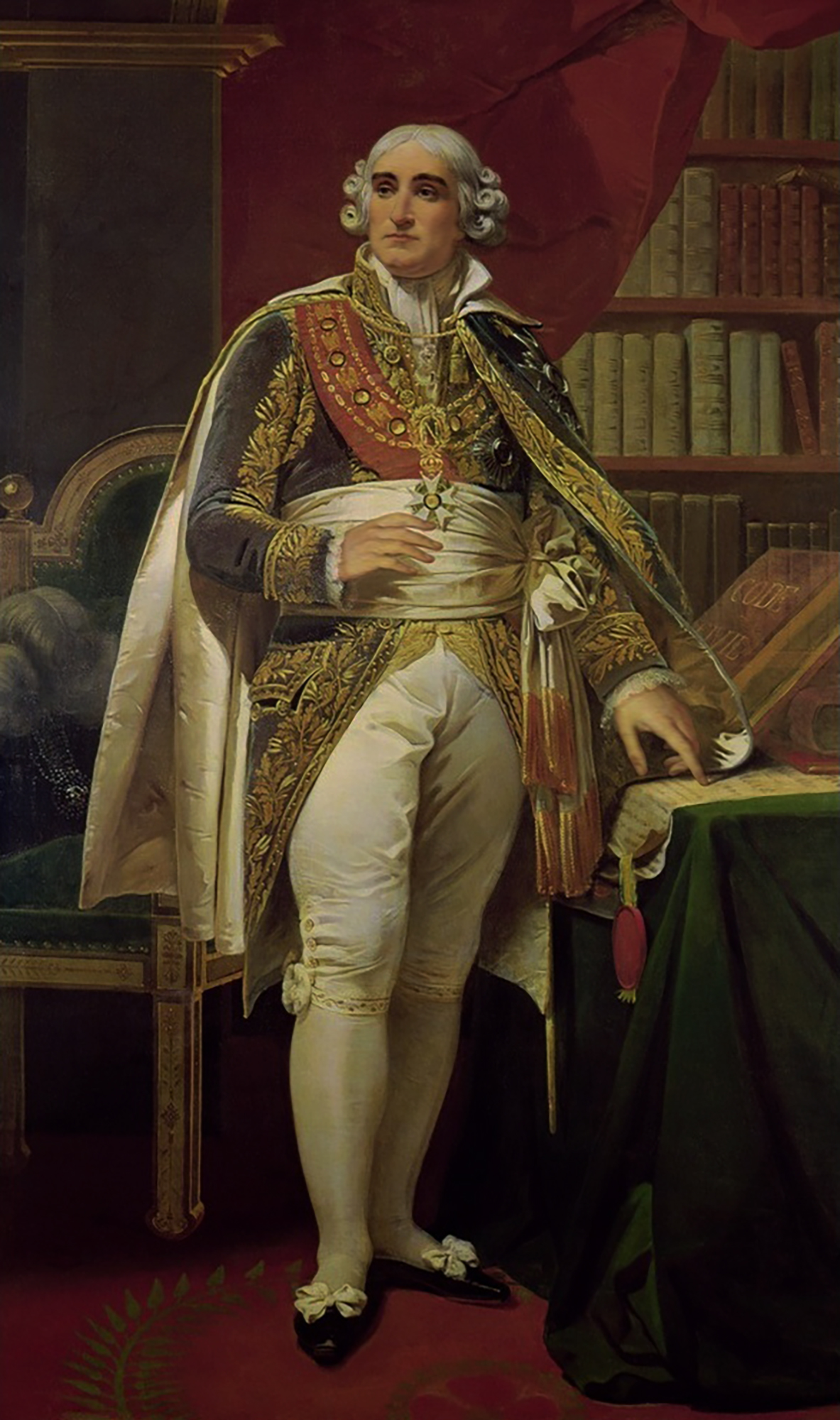
- Portrait by Henri Frédéric Schopin after an 1814 original

Second Consul of France
- In office 12 December 1799 – 18 May 1804 Serving with Napoleon Bonaparte and Charles-François Lebrun
- Preceded by: Emmanuel Joseph Sieyès (as Provisional Consul)
- Succeeded by: Republic abolished

Archchancellor of the Empire
- In office 18 May 1804 – 14 April 1814; 20 March 1815 – 22 June 1815
- Monarch: Napoleon I

Minister of Justice
- In office 20 March 1815 – 22 June 1815
- Preceded by: Charles Dambray
- Succeeded by: Antoine Jacques Claude Joseph, comte Boulay de la Meurthe

52nd President of the National Convention
- In office 7 October 1794 – 22 October 1794
- Preceded by: André Dumont
- Succeeded by: Pierre Louis Prieur

Personal details
- Born: 18 October 1753 Montpellier, France
- Died: 8 March 1824 (aged 70) Paris, France
- Resting place: Père Lachaise Cemetery

Jean-Jacques-Régis de Cambacérès, Duke of Parma (French: [ʒɑ̃ ʒak ʁeʒis də kɑ̃baseʁɛs]; 18 October 1753 – 8 March 1824), was a French lawyer and statesman active during the French Revolution and the First French Empire. He is best remembered as one of the authors of the Napoleonic Code, which still forms the basis of French civil law and French-inspired civil law in many countries.

== Early life ==
Cambacérès was born in Montpellier, into a family of the legal nobility. Although his childhood was relatively poor, his brother Étienne Hubert de Cambacérès later became a cardinal, and his father later became mayor of Montpellier.

In 1774, Cambacérès graduated in law from the college d'Aix and succeeded his father as Councillor in the court of accounts and finances in Toulouse. He was a supporter of the French Revolution of 1789, and was elected as an extra deputy to represent the nobility of Montpellier, in case the government doubled the nobility's delegation at the meeting of the Estates-General at Versailles. However, as the delegation was not increased, he never took his seat. In 1792, he represented the department of Hérault at the National Convention which assembled and proclaimed the French First Republic in September 1792.

== National Convention ==
In revolutionary terms, Cambacérès was a moderate republican and sat left of center during the National Convention. During the trial of Louis XVI he protested that the Convention did not have the power to sit as a court and demanded that the king should have due facilities for his defence. Nevertheless, when the trial proceeded, Cambacérès voted with the majority that declared Louis to be guilty, but recommended that the penalty should be postponed until it could be ratified by a legislative body. This would later save him from being executed for regicide. During the convention, many of his decisions (like the latter) were well thought out and calculated. Cambacérès made sure that he never committed himself to a certain faction. His legal expertise made him useful to all parties; he was a friend to all and an enemy to none. However, due to this, his fellow representatives at the convention did criticize him for sometimes fluctuating on some positions.

== Rise under Napoleon ==
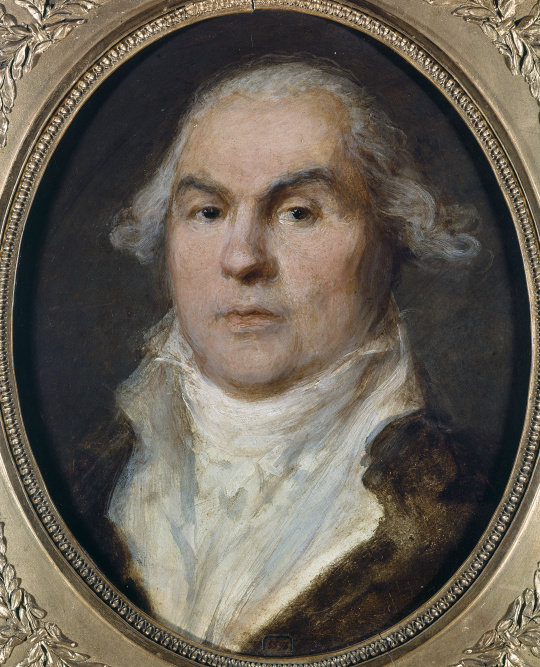
Portrait by Jean-Baptiste Greuze, late 1790s

Cambacérès was a member of the Committee of General Defence from 1793 until the end of 1794, and later became a member of its infamous successor, the Committee of Public Safety after the fall of Robespierre. In the meantime he worked on much of the legislation of the revolutionary period. During 1795, he was employed as a diplomat and negotiated treaties with Spain, Tuscany, Prussia and the Batavian Republic. His remarkable debating skills gave him a spot as a councilor of the Five Hundred from 1795 to 1799.

Cambacérès was considered too conservative to be one of the five Directors who took power in the coup of 1795 and, finding himself in opposition to the Executive Directory, he retired from politics. In 1799, however, as the Revolution entered a more moderate phase, he became Minister of Justice. He supported the coup of 18 Brumaire (in November 1799) that brought Napoleon Bonaparte to power as First Consul, a new regime designed to establish a stable constitutional republic.

== Napoleonic Code ==
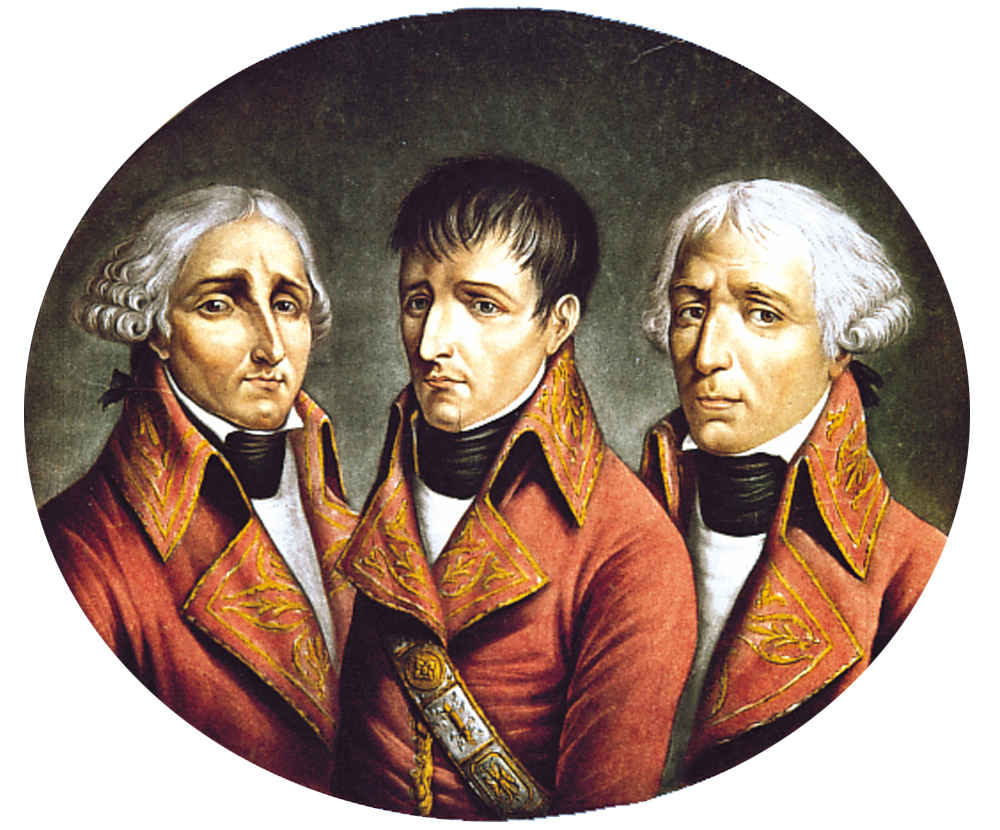
A portrait of the three Consuls, from left to right: Jean Jacques Régis de Cambacérès, Napoleon Bonaparte and Charles-François Lebrun.

In December 1799, Cambacérès was appointed Second Consul under Bonaparte. He owed this appointment to his vast legal knowledge and his reputation as a moderate republican. His most important work during this period, and arguably during his entire political career, was the drawing up of a new Civil Law Code (later called the Napoleonic Code; France's first modern legal code). The Code was promulgated by Bonaparte (as Emperor Napoleon) in 1804. In the end, the Napoleonic Code was the work of Cambacérès and a commission of four lawyers.

The Code was a minor revised form of Roman law, with minor modifications drawn from the laws of the Franks still current in northern France (Coutume de Paris). The Code was later extended by Napoleon's occupations to Poland, Italy, the Netherlands, Belgium, and Western Germany. Cambacérès' work has thus been influential in European legal history. However, versions of the Code are only still in force in Quebec (which was never under Napoleon' control) and Louisiana, which was only briefly under Napoleon's control.

The Napoleonic Code dealt with Civil Law; other codes ensued for Penal Law, criminal procedure, and civil procedure.

== Life with Napoleon (1804–1815) ==
Cambacérès coat of arms as dignitary and nobleman of the French Empire.

Cambacérès disapproved of Bonaparte's accumulation of power into his own hands (culminating in the proclamation of the First French Empire on 18 May 1804) but retained high office under Napoleon: Arch-Chancellor of the Empire and President of the House of Peers from 2 June, to 7 July 1815. He also became a prince of the Empire and in 1808 was made Duke of Parma (French: duc de Parme). His duchy was one of the twenty created as a duché grand-fief (among 2200 noble titles created by Napoleon)—a rare hereditary honor, extinguished upon Cambacérès' death in 1824. He was essentially second in command of France during the Napoleonic era.

Under Napoleon, he was a force for moderation and reason, opposing adventures such as the Spanish affairs in 1808 and the invasion of Russia in 1812. Nevertheless, Cambacérès was extremely trusted by Napoleon and was constantly consulted for advice; Cambacérès even sat as Council of State when Bonaparte was involved in other affairs. As Napoleon became increasingly obsessed with military affairs, Cambacérès became the de facto domestic head of government of France, a position which inevitably made him increasingly unpopular as France's economic situation grew worse. As more and more of Napoleon's ministers proved themselves untrustworthy, Cambacérès' power continued to grow. His taste for high living also attracted hostile comments. Nevertheless, he was given credit for the justice and moderation of the government, although the enforcement of conscription was increasingly resented towards the end of the Napoleonic Wars.

When the Empire fell in 1814, Cambacérès retired to private life but was later called upon during Napoléon's brief return to power in 1815. During the Hundred Days, the short period of time when Napoleon returned from exile, Cambacérès served as the minister of justice. After the restoration of the monarchy, he was in danger of arrest for his revolutionary activities, and he was exiled from France in 1816. The fact that he had opposed the execution of Louis XVI counted in his favor, and in May 1818 his civil rights as a citizen of France were restored. From 1815 and on, Cambacérès used the title of Duke of Cambacérès (on the fall of the Empire, the Duchy of Parma passed to former Empress Marie Louise). He was a member of the Académie Française and lived quietly in Paris until his death in 1824.

== Private life ==
The common belief that Cambacérès is responsible for decriminalizing homosexuality in France is in error. Before the French Revolution, sodomy had been a capital crime under royal legislation. The penalty was burning at the stake. Very few men, however, were ever actually prosecuted and executed for consensual sodomy (no more than five in the entire eighteenth century). Sodomites arrested by the police were more usually released with a warning or held in prison for, at most, a few weeks or months. The National Constituent Assembly revised French criminal law in 1791 and got rid of a variety of offenses inspired by religion, including blasphemy. Sodomy was not specifically mentioned but was covered under the umbrella of 'religious crimes'. Since there was no public debate, its motives remain unknown (a similar state of affairs occurred during the early years of the Russian Revolution).

19th-century erotic interpretation of Jean-Jacques-Régis de Cambacérès

Cambacérès' homosexual orientation was well-known, and he does not seem to have made any effort to conceal it. He remained unmarried, and kept to the company of other bachelors. Napoleon is recorded as making a number of jokes on the subject. Upon hearing that Cambacérès had recruited a woman for a mission, Napoleon responded with, "my compliments, so you have come closer to women?". Robert Badinter once mentioned in a speech to the French National Assembly, during debates on reforming the homosexual age of consent, that Cambacérès was known in the gardens of the Palais-Royal as "Tante Urlurette".

While Cambacérès was not responsible for ending the legal prosecution of homosexuals, he did play a key role in drafting the Code Napoléon, but this was a civil law code. He had nothing to do with the Penal Code of 1810, which covered sexual crimes.

The authors of the Penal Code of 1810 had the option of reintroducing a law against male homosexuality but there is no evidence that they even considered doing so. However, Napoleonic officials could and did repress public expressions of homosexuality using other laws, such as "offenses against public decency". Nevertheless, despite police surveillance and harassment, the Revolutionary and Napoleonic era was a time of relative freedom for homosexuals and opened the modern era of legal toleration for homosexuality in Europe. Napoleonic conquests imposed the principles of Napoleon's Penal Code (including the decriminalization of homosexuality) on many other parts of Europe, including Belgium, the Netherlands, the Rhineland, and Italy. Other states freely followed the French example, including Bavaria in 1813 and Spain in 1822.

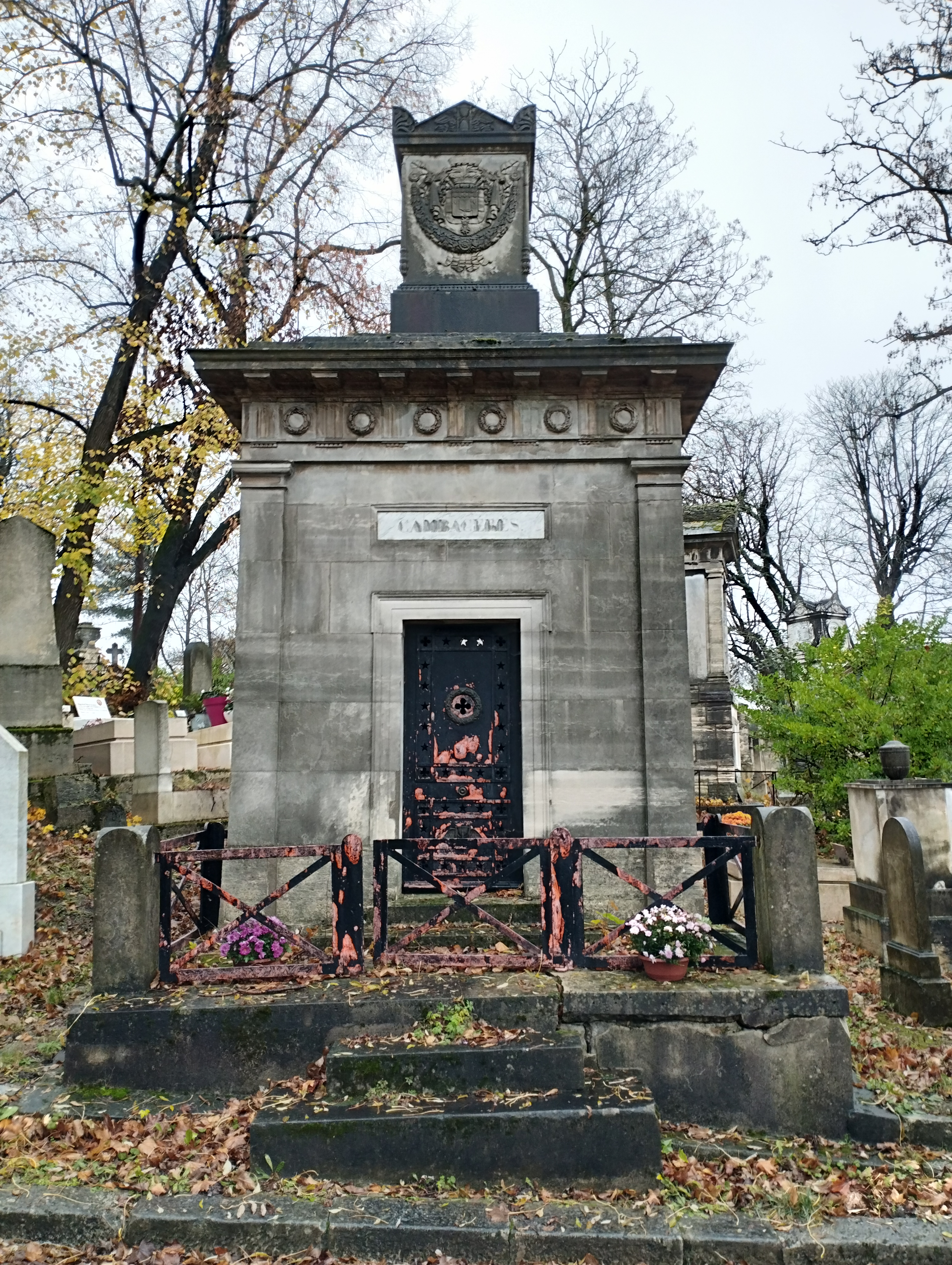
Grave of Cambacérès in Père-Lachaise

In addition to jesting about his homosexuality, Cambacérès' colleagues did not fail to poke fun at his gluttony. When he met with the council while Napoleon was away, everyone knew that the meeting would be over before lunch. He was known for having the best dinners in France and for his extravagant lifestyle. Cambacérès was recorded as saying "a country is governed by good dinner parties". His estate was worth around 7.3 million francs (around €50 million in 2015 euros) upon his death in 1824. His body now lies in the cemetery of Père Lachaise where he was buried with military honors.

== Free-Masonry ==
Cambaceres was admitted to the lodge of "Les Amis Fidèles" in Montpellier in 1775. During Napoleon's reign, he was charged by the Emperor to monitor Free-Masonry in France and the French Rite. From 1805 to 1815, he was the assistant of Joseph Bonaparte, Grand Master of Grand Orient de France, and managed the post-revolutionary rebirth of French freemasonry. During his term, more than 1200 lodges were created.

== Bibliography ==
- 1973 - Lettres inédites à Napoléon, 1802-1814. Paris: Éditions Klincksieck. Bevat: T. 1: Janvier 1802 – juillet 1807; T. 2: Avril 1808 – avril 1814 ISBN 2-252-01464-4 (t. 1), ISBN 2-252-01525-X (t. 2))

Political offices
Preceded by Three Provisional Consuls; Napoleon Bonaparte; Roger Ducos; Joseph Sieyes	Head of State of France; Second Consul, along with: Napoleon Bonaparte (First Consul); Charles-François Lebrun (Third Consul); 1799–1804	Succeeded by Napoleon I (as Emperor of the French)
