= Villeneuve-d'Allier =

- Commune
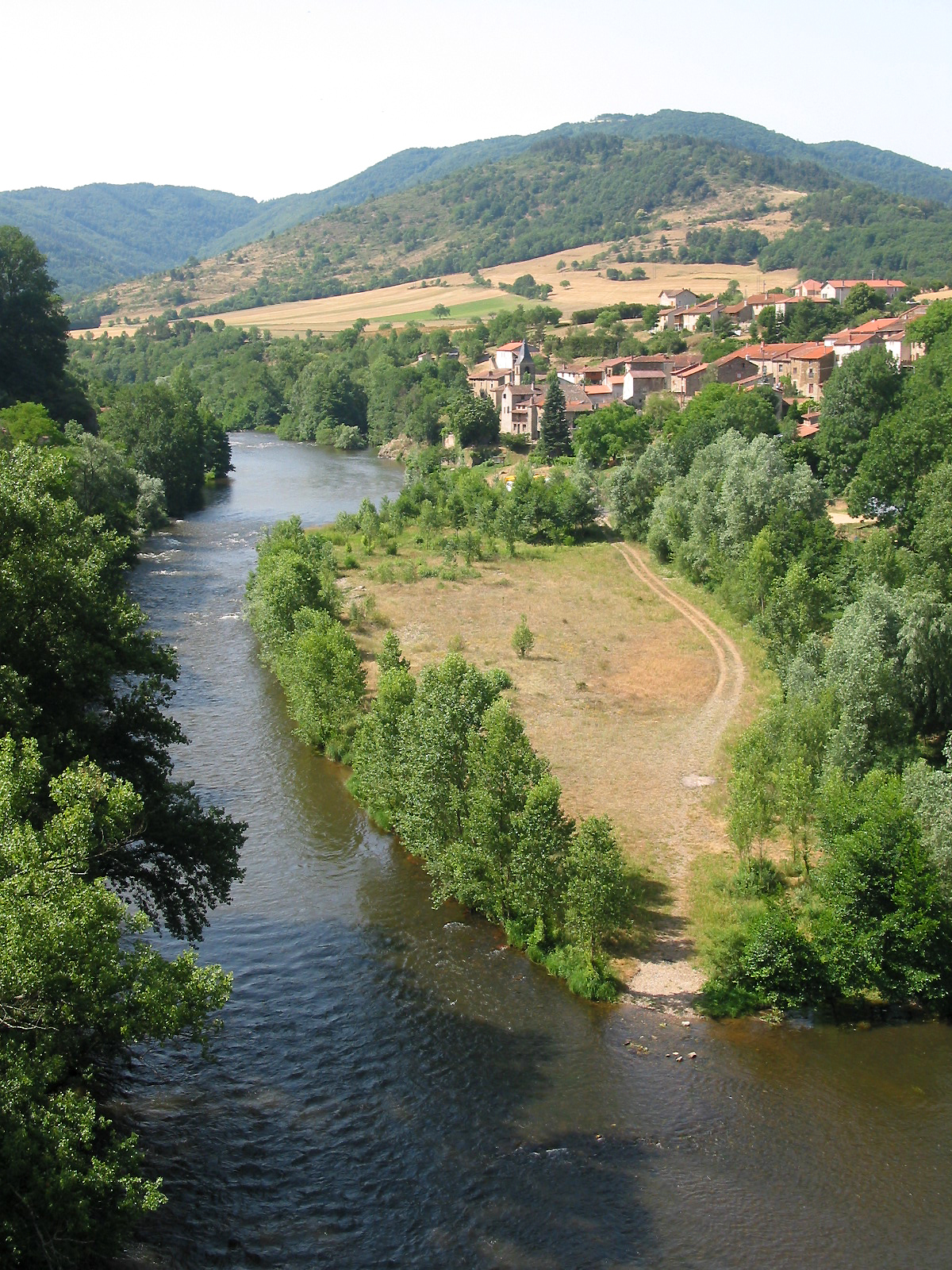
- The river Allier
- Location of Villeneuve-d'Allier
- Location within France Location within Auvergne-Rhône-Alpes
- Coordinates: 45°11′56″N 3°23′05″E
- Country: France
- Region: Auvergne-Rhône-Alpes
- Department: Haute-Loire
- Arrondissement: Brioude
- Canton: Pays de Lafayette

Government
  - Mayor (2020–2026): Nathalie Rambourdin
- Area^{1}: 14.31 km^{2} (5.53 sq mi)
- Elevation: 456 m (1,496 ft)
- Highest elevation: 902 m (2,959 ft)
- Lowest elevation: 436 m (1,430 ft)
- Population (2023): 280
  - Density: 20/km^{2} (51/sq mi)
- Time zone: UTC+01:00 (CET)
  - Summer (DST): UTC+02:00 (CEST)
- INSEE/Postal code: 43264 /43380
- ^{1} French Land Register data, which excludes lakes, ponds, glaciers > 1 km^{2} (0.386 sq mi or 247 acres) and river estuaries.

Villeneuve-d'Allier (French pronunciation: [vilnœv dalje]) is a commune in the Haute-Loire department in south-central France. It was created in 1845 from part of the commune of Saint-Ilpize.

== Population ==
Historical population

Year	Pop.	±% p.a.
1846	1,066	—
1851	1,101	+0.65%
1856	1,056	−0.83%
1861	1,040	−0.30%
1866	1,028	−0.23%
1872	1,028	+0.00%
1876	1,045	+0.41%
1881	1,022	−0.44%
1886	989	−0.65%
1891	975	−0.28%
1896	944	−0.64%
1901	967	+0.48%
1906	900	−1.43%
1911	826	−1.70%
1921	666	−2.13%

Year	Pop.	±% p.a.
1926	571	−3.03%
1931	550	−0.75%
1936	578	+1.00%
1946	433	−2.85%
1954	380	−1.62%
1962	368	−0.40%
1968	324	−2.10%
1975	298	−1.19%
1982	346	+2.16%
1990	288	−2.27%
1999	306	+0.68%
2007	324	+0.72%
2012	324	+0.00%
2017	290	−2.19%
2023	280	−0.58%

Source: EHESS and INSEE (1968-2023)

== See also ==
- Communes of the Haute-Loire department
