= Chapel of the White Penitents =

Roman Catholic chapel in Montpellier, France

Chapel of Sainte-Foy, also known as the Chapel of the White Penitents
- Chapelle Sainte-Foy, dite chapelle des Pénitents blancs
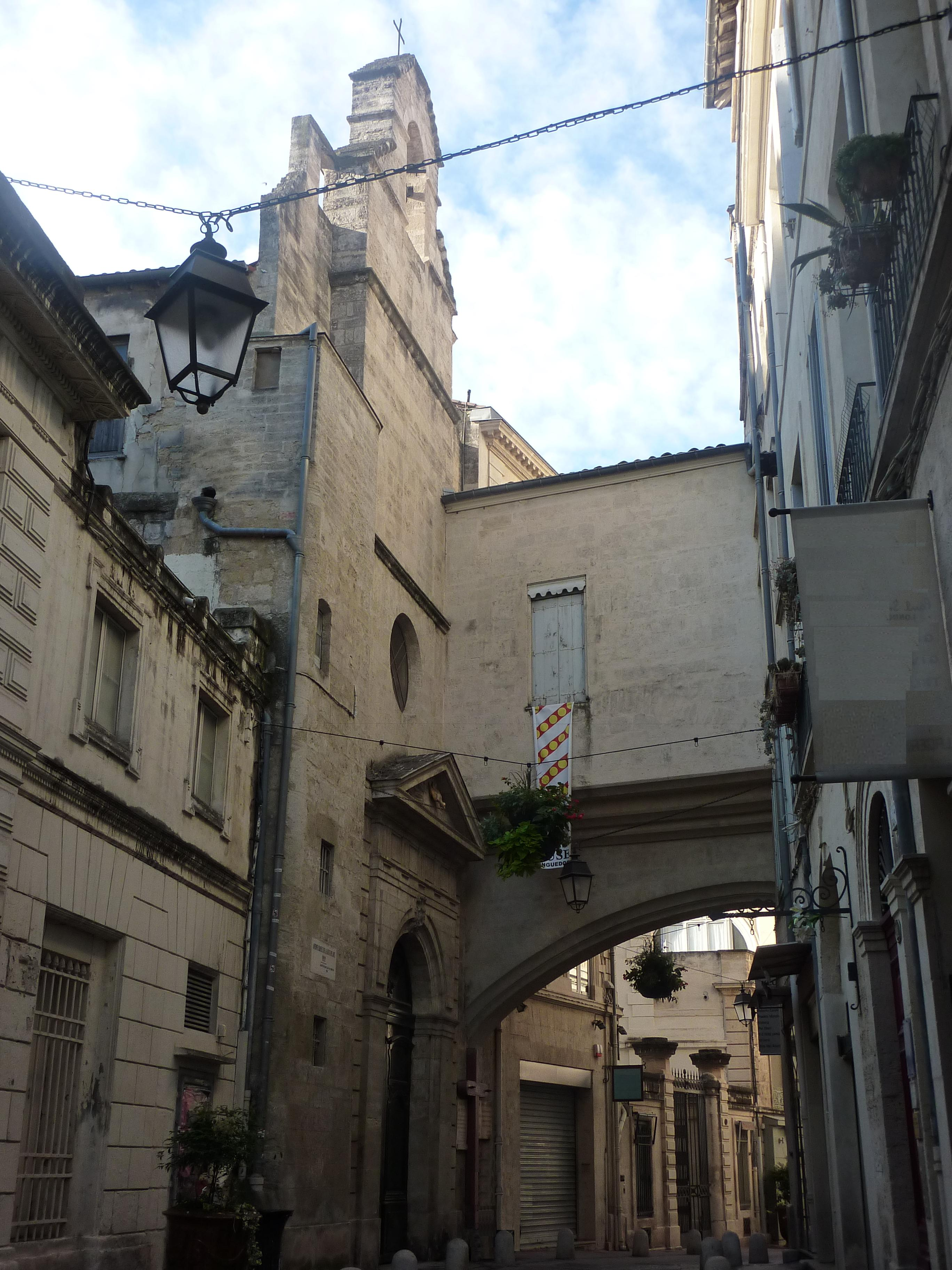
- Facade of the chapel at 14 Rue Jacques Coeur, 34000 Montpellier.

Religion
- Affiliation: Roman Catholic
- Region: Occitanie
- Leadership: Diocese of Montpellier
- Status: Active

Location
- Location: Montpellier, Hérault, France
- Interactive map of Chapel of Sainte-Foy, also known as the Chapel of the White Penitents
- Coordinates: 43°36′35″N 3°52′46″E

Architecture
- Completed: Rebuilt 1624

Website
- www.penitents.fr

The Chapel of Sainte-Foy (commonly called the "Chapel of the White Penitents") is a Roman Catholic chapel located in the heart of Montpellier, at 14 Rue Jacques Coeur. Dedicated to Saint Foy, the chapel was originally established in the Middle Ages. It is notable for its Baroque interior, including a coffered ceiling painted in the 17th century, and its functioning bell dating back to 1401.

== Construction ==
The construction of the chapel likely dates back to the 12th century. It is first mentioned in a document dated July 12, 1228, referring to earlier legal contexts. Located along the Way of Saint James (Cami Roumieu), it likely served the small suburb of "Flocaria," which developed near one of the city's main gates. Alternatively, it may have been founded in anticipation of new fortifications. By the mid-13th century, the suburb and the chapel were incorporated within the city walls.

Initially of Romanesque style, the chapel underwent renovations around 1380. The bridge-like arch crossing Rue Jacques Coeur is one of Montpellier's three remaining structures of this type, though often mistakenly associated with the Arc Pellissier of 1528.

== Destruction and rebuilding ==
The chapel was destroyed during the French Wars of Religion, first in 1562 and again in 1568, with few remnants of the original structure surviving apart from portions of the facade and lateral walls. It remained in ruins for over 50 years and was repurposed as an open cemetery. Reconstruction began in 1623 after the site was deemed no longer of military importance. Bishop Pierre de Fenouillet returned the ruins to the Confraternity of the White Penitents. The chapel was consecrated on Christmas Eve in 1624.

== Interior features ==
Between 1647 and 1698, the Penitents focused on decorating the interior:

- Ceiling: The painted coffered ceiling features 21 compartments, of which 18 were completed between 1671 and 1691. Themes include the life of Christ, with inspiration from Nicolas Poussin, Annibale Carracci, and Pierre Mignard. Contributors included Simon Raoux and the Pezet family.
- Wood Paneling: Between 1698 and 1706, gilded wood paneling was added, designed by architect Augustin-Charles d'Aviler
- Altarpiece: The 17th-century gilded wood elements include a tabernacle and a liturgical palm.
- Paintings: Notable works include Saint Louis venerating the Holy Thorn and Saint Jerome in the Desert.
- Bell Tower: Enhanced in 1627, it houses a bell from 1401.

== Status and access ==
The chapel is owned by the Confraternity of the White Penitents and remains active. It is open for visits on Saturdays and during special events such as Christmas.

== Recognition ==
The chapel was classified as a Monument historique on February 17, 1995.
