= Incorporation (Netherlands) =

1810–13 period under the First French Empire

- 9 July 1810 – 21 November 1813
Kingdom of Holland	United Netherlands
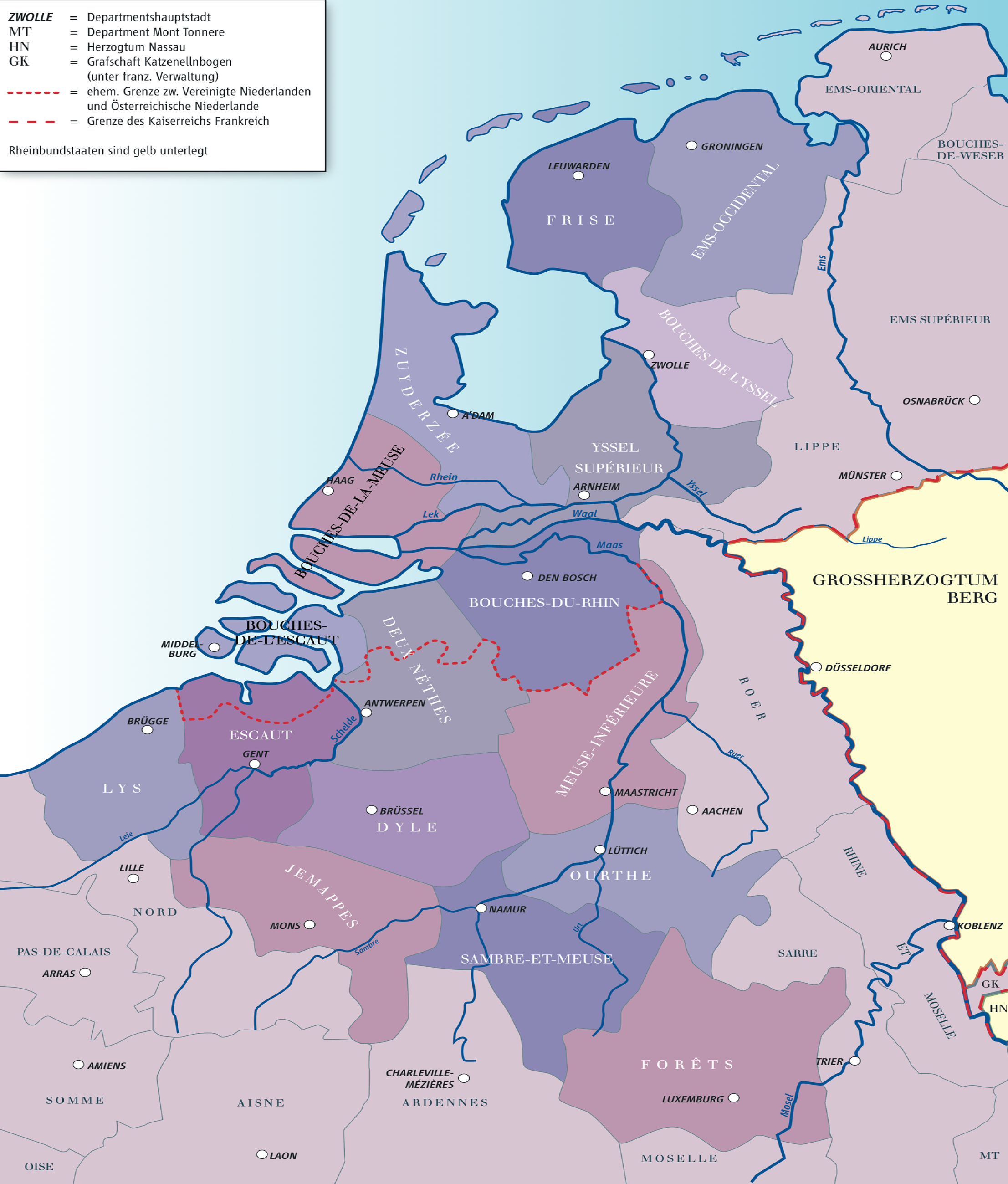
- The French departments in the Netherlands
- Location: First French Empire (present day Netherlands)
- Monarch: Napoleon I
- Leader: Charles-François Lebrun
- Key events: Siege of Breda

The Incorporation is a period in the history of the Netherlands where it was part of the First French Empire, which lasted from 9 July 1810 to 21 November 1813.

== History ==
=== Dissolution of the kingdom ===
The Batavian Republic which existed from 1795 was made into a kingdom by Napoleon Bonaparte in 1806. He placed his younger brother Louis Bonaparte on the throne of the newly formed Kingdom of Holland. During his kingship Louis tried to maintain an independent course from his brother, but Napoleon grew tired of Louis' military weakness. After the Walcheren Campaign in the summer of 1809 he summoned his brother to Paris and incorporated the island of Walcheren later that year. Next year, the Dutch territories south of the Rhine were added into the growing empire of Napoleon. With these sacrifices Louis Bonaparte hoped he could please his brother and he could remain king of this reduced kingdom.

Louis Napoleon abdicated and fled his kingdom on 2 July 1810. Immediately Marshal Nicolas Oudinot took control of the capital of the kingdom, Amsterdam. A week later Napoleon officially incorporated the Kingdom of Holland into his empire. He gave the order to his confidant Charles-François Lebrun to oversee the transition of the French rule in the former kingdom as a Lieutenant General. After a few days Lebrun arrived in Amsterdam. In August 1810 a committee of 15 Dutch notables went to Paris to give the French government proposals for the efficiently integration of the Netherlands into the French Empire.

=== The Dutch departments ===
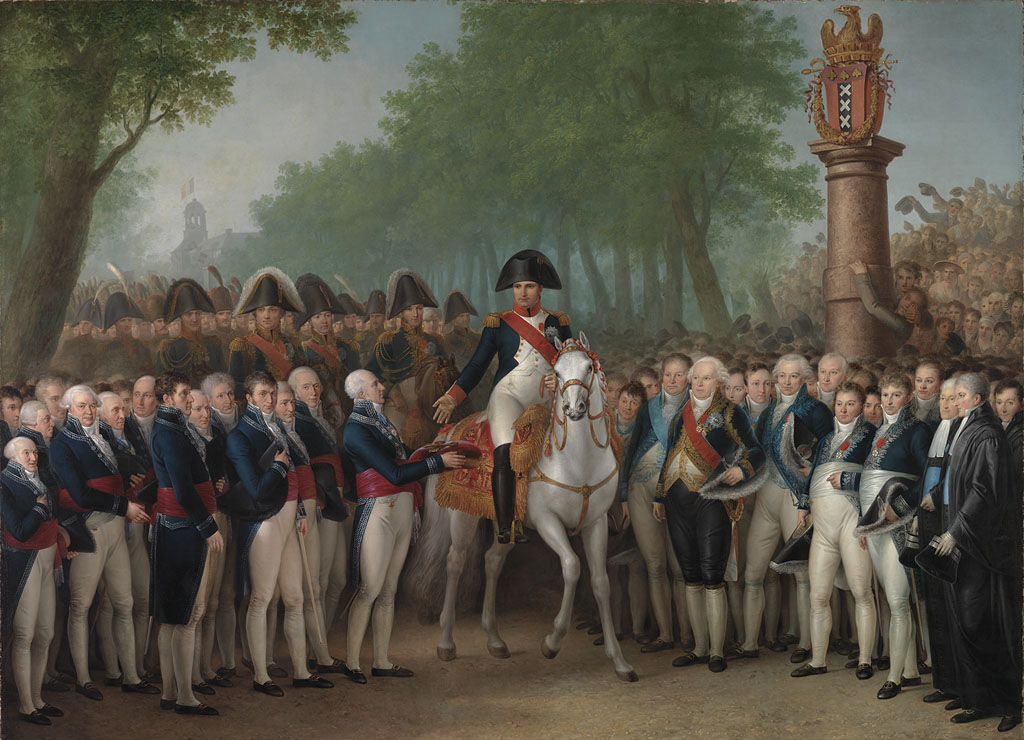
Napoleon visiting Amsterdam on 9 October 1811

In the Decree of Rambouillet of November 9, 1810, the official incorporation act, the structure of the Kingdom of Holland was largely kept intact. Louis Bonaparte's ministers stayed at their positions until 1811. The city of Amsterdam became the third capital of the First French Empire, after Paris and Rome. In the Dutch departments the French language became the official language. Napoleon also formed seven Dutch departments and at the top of the Dutch departments was the governor general: Lebrun. He was assisted with some intendants, ministers, for governing the Dutch departments. François Dalphonse was made intendant de l'interieur and Alexander Gogel became intendant des finances.

The introduction of imperial conscription in the former Kingdom of Holland in 1811 became the most unpopular measure of the government. The conscription led to civil unrest in different parts of the incorporated territories and it was the most sincere form of unrest during the Incorporation. Besides the conscription several other French institutions were introduced in the Netherlands. Civil marriage, status, the land registry and the chamber of commerce were all introduced during the Incorporation.

When Napoleon lost the Battle of Leipzig in the autumn of 1813, the Dutch departments were, a month later, invaded by Russian Cossacks and Prussian troops. Within weeks, the French administration in the Netherlands crumbled and Lebrun and the army fled to France. The Dutch politician Gijsbert Karel van Hogendorp issued a proclamation for the independence of the Netherlands and making an end to the Incorporation. The son of the last stadtholder, William Frederick, returned to the Netherlands to become the first sovereign of the country. After the Congress of Vienna, he became the first king of the Netherlands.

== Military ==
After Holland was incorporated in the French Empire the Dutch army also came under French authority. The Dutch regiments were reorganized to fit into the Napoleonic army. The incorporated area was divided into two military divisions (Divisions militaires). The troops in these divisions were responsible for the defense of the area they were stationed, maintaining public order and monitored compliance the laws of conscription and the Continental System. The divisions were led by the French generals Pierre François Joseph Durutte and Gabriel Jean Joseph Molitor.

== Government ==
The government of the Dutch departments during the Incorporation consisted of:

- Charles-François Lebrun, governor general
- Alexander Gogel, intendant of finance
- François Dalphonse, intendant of the interior
- Jacob van den Houte (until 1812) and Johan Hendrik Mollerus, director of water management
- Robert Voûte, director of the treasury
- Charles Coquebert de Montbret, director of the Customs
- Cornelis Charles Six van Oterleek, director of Public Debt
- Paul Étienne de Villiers du Terrage, director of the police
