= Sainte-Mesme =

- Commune
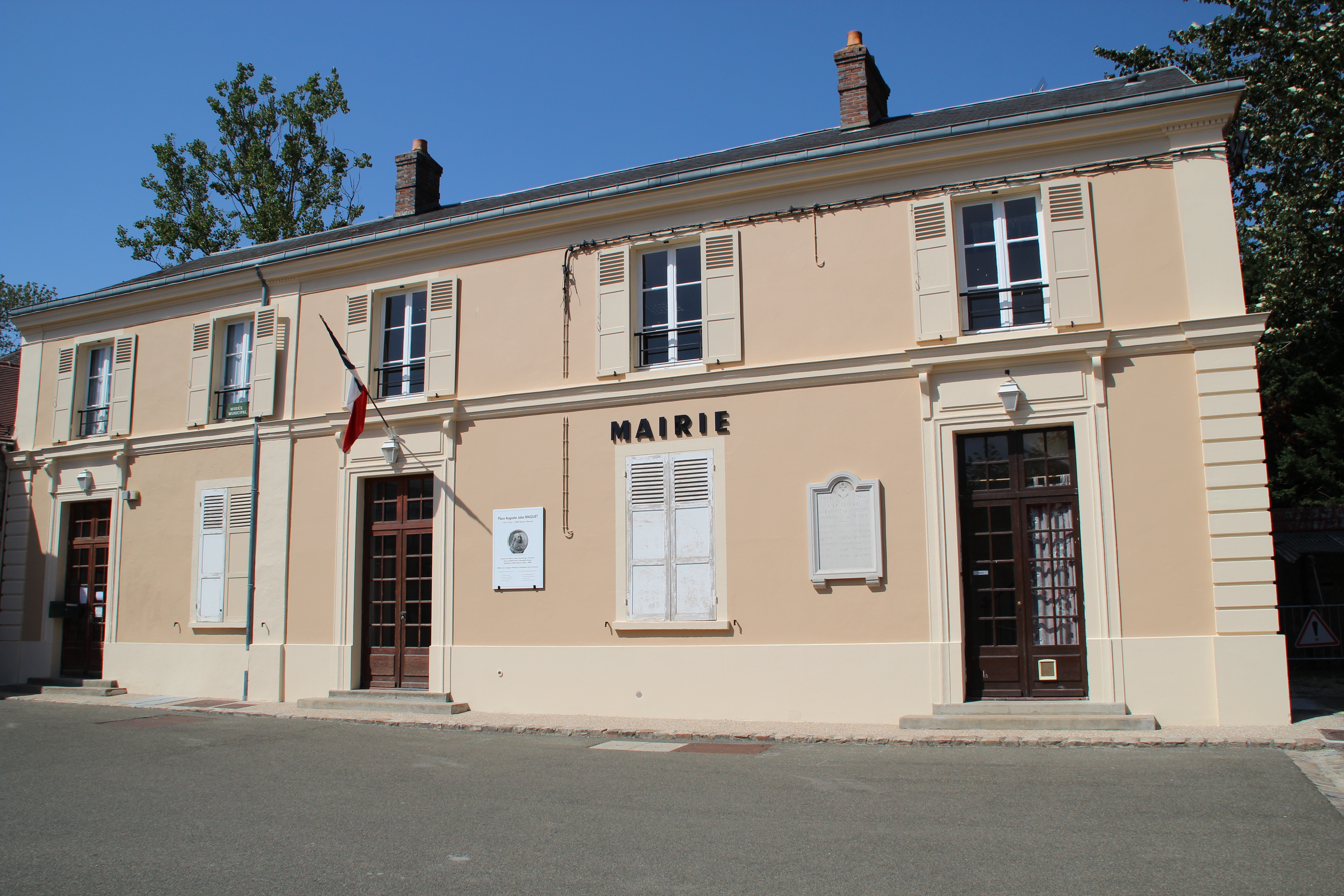
- Town hall
- Location of Sainte-Mesme
- Location within France Location within Île-de-France (region)
- Coordinates: 48°31′53″N 1°57′34″E
- Country: France
- Region: Île-de-France
- Department: Yvelines
- Arrondissement: Rambouillet
- Canton: Rambouillet
- Intercommunality: CA Rambouillet Territoires

Government
  - Mayor (2020–2026): Isabelle Copetti
- Area^{1}: 8.16 km^{2} (3.15 sq mi)
- Elevation: 117 m (384 ft)
- Highest elevation: 162 m (531 ft)
- Lowest elevation: 96 m (315 ft)
- Population (2023): 904
  - Density: 111/km^{2} (287/sq mi)
- Time zone: UTC+01:00 (CET)
  - Summer (DST): UTC+02:00 (CEST)
- INSEE/Postal code: 78569 /78730
- ^{1} French Land Register data, which excludes lakes, ponds, glaciers > 1 km^{2} (0.386 sq mi or 247 acres) and river estuaries.

Sainte-Mesme (French pronunciation: [sɛ̃t mɛm]) is a commune in the Yvelines department in the Île-de-France region in north-central France.

== See also ==
- Communes of the Yvelines department
