= Grand Dignitaries of the French Empire =

Highest officeholders in the First French Empire

Coat of arms of a Grand Dignitary of the French Empire

The Grand Dignitaries of the French Empire (French: Grands Dignitaires de l'Empire Français) were created in 1804 by the Constitution of the Year XII, which established Napoleon Bonaparte, previously First Consul for Life, as Emperor of the French. The seven Grand Dignitaries broadly paralleled the Great Officers of the Crown which had existed under the Ancien Régime and were essentially honorific, although several limited functions were ascribed to them in the new constitution of the Empire. In the imperial nobility, the Grand Dignitaries ranked in status directly behind the Princes of France, although in practice, most Grand Dignitaries also held the title of Prince.

In 1807, two new dignitaries were created, a further two in 1809, and another in 1810, raising the final number to twelve. Many of the dignitaries were also members of the Imperial Family, with those that were not being high-ranking figures in the imperial administration. The Grand Dignitaries were abolished along with the First Empire in 1814 upon the Bourbon Restoration, the Great Officers of the Crown being reinstated, and were not restored under the Second Empire.

== Grand Dignitaries of the Empire ==
=== Appointed in 1804 ===
- Jean de Cambacérès, Archchancellor of the Empire
- Eugène de Beauharnais, Archchancellor of State
- Charles-François Lebrun, Archtreasurer
- Joseph Bonaparte, Grand Elector
- Louis Bonaparte, Grand Constable
- Joachim Murat, Grand Admiral
- Louis-Alexandre Berthier, Grand Huntsman

=== Appointed in 1805 ===
- Joseph Fesch, Grand Almoner

=== Appointed in 1807 ===
Coat of Arms of Marshal Louis-Alexandre Berthier, Prince of Wagram, with the attributes of Vice-Grand Constable of the Empire (the swords) and the crossed batons of a Marshal of the Empire.

- Charles de Talleyrand-Périgord, Vice-Grand Elector
- Louis-Alexandre Berthier, Vice-Grand Constable

=== Appointed in 1809 ===
- Camillo Borghese, Governor-General of the Departments Beyond the Alps
- Elisa Bonaparte, Grand Duchess of Tuscany

=== Appointed in 1810 ===
- Charles-François Lebrun, Governor-General of the Departments of Holland

== Gallery ==
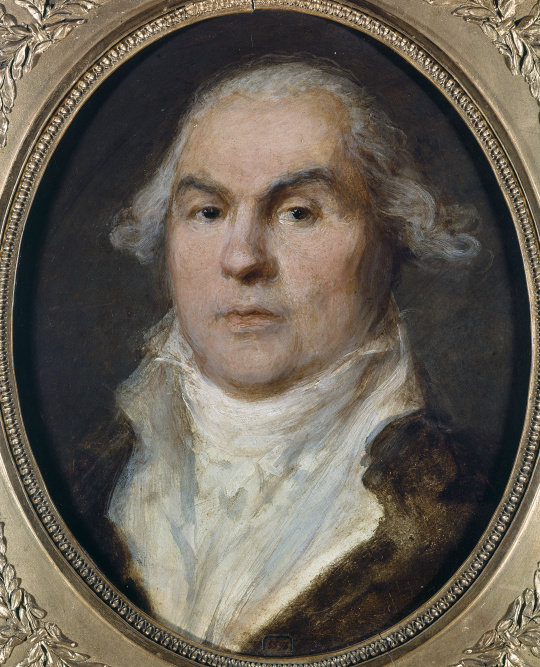
Jean-Jacques-Régis de Cambacérès

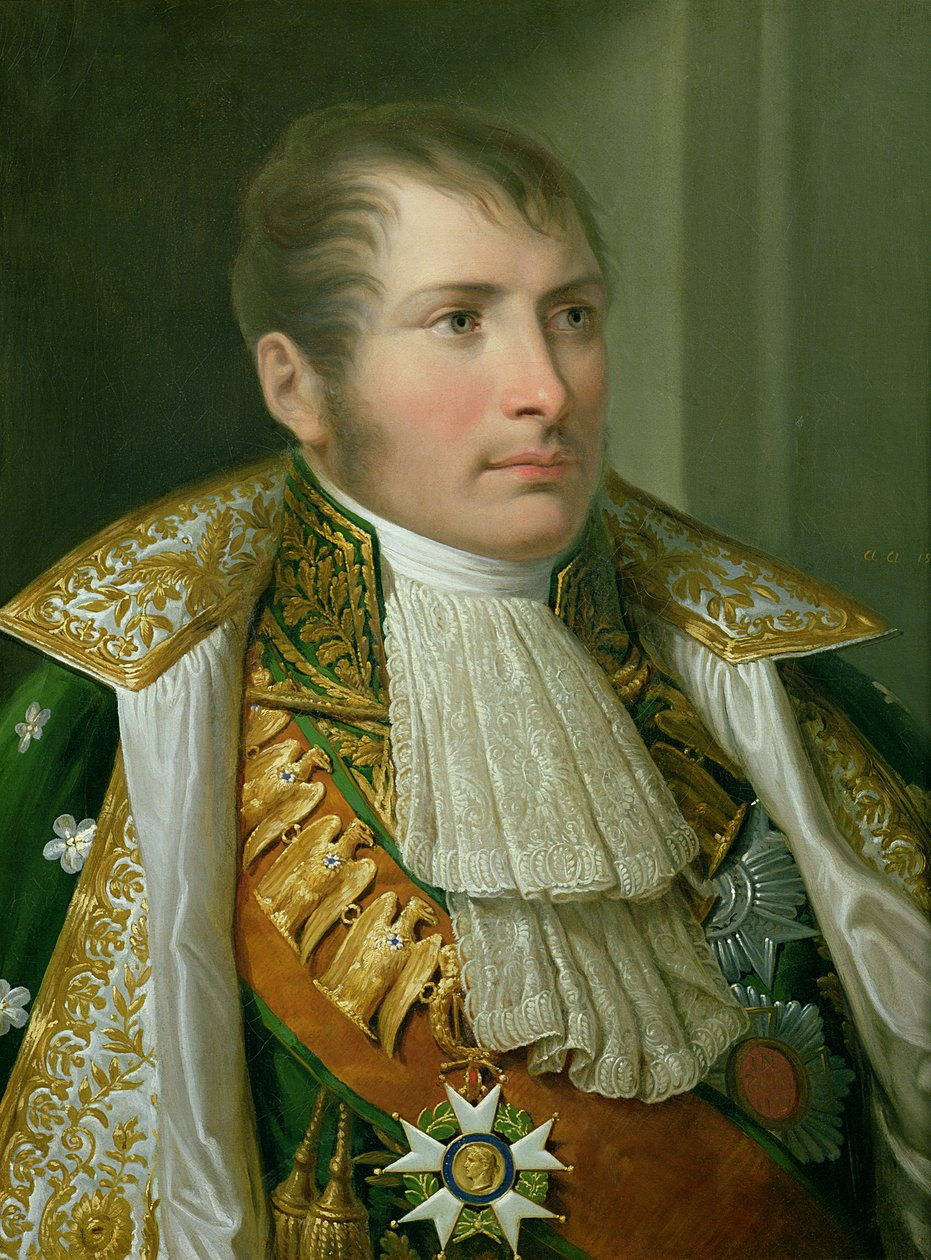
Eugène de Beauharnais

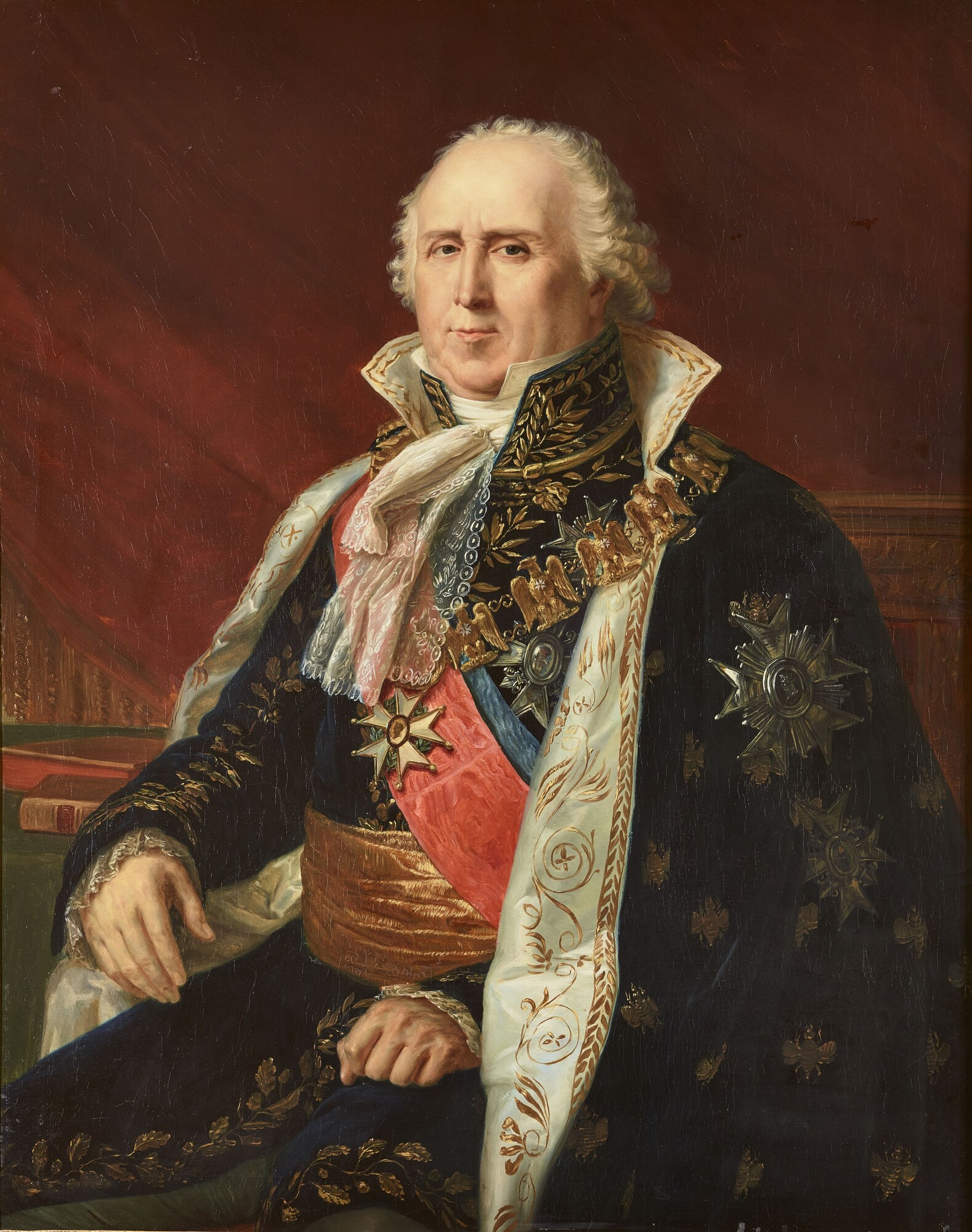
Charles-François Lebrun

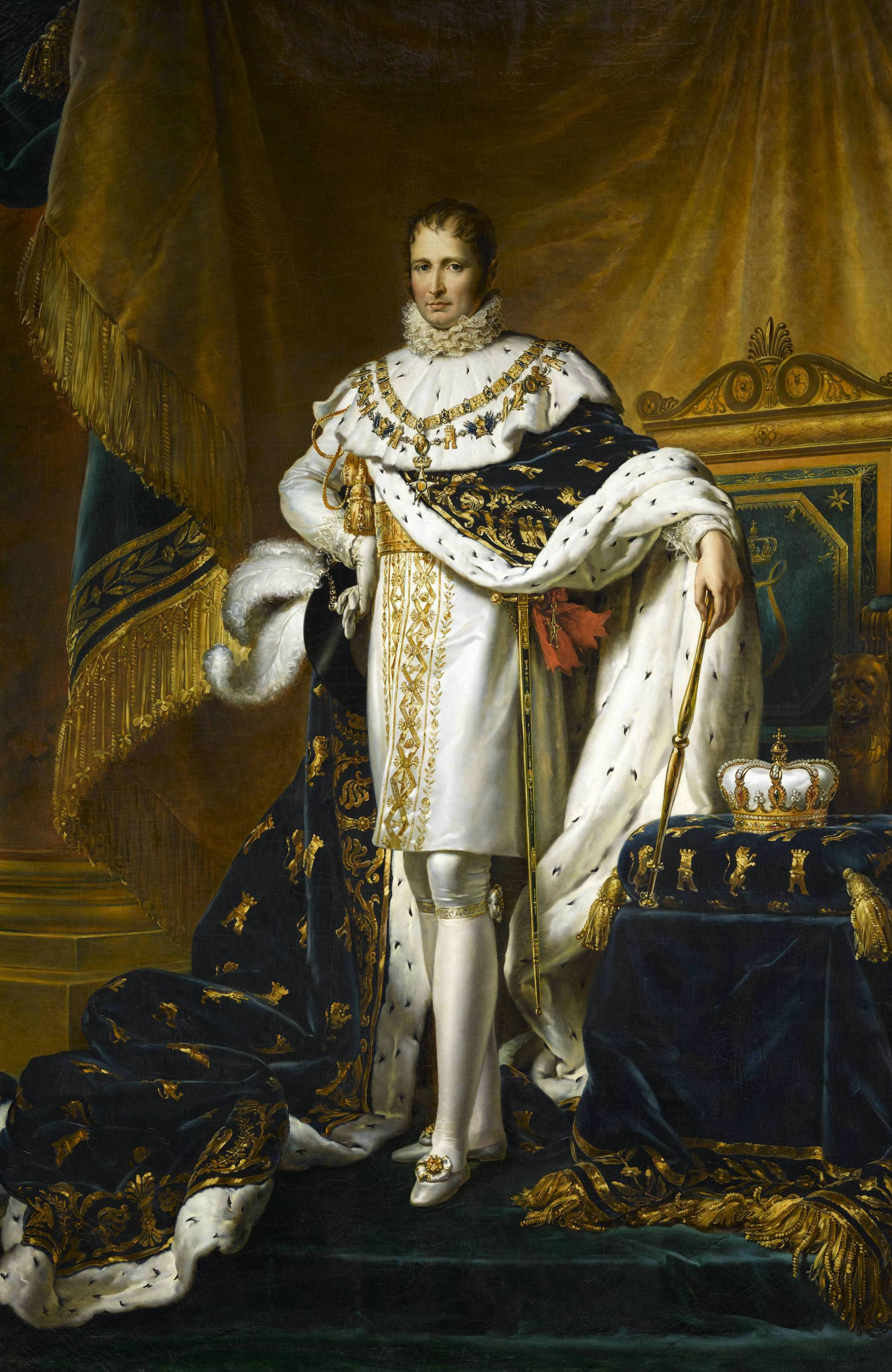
Joseph Bonaparte

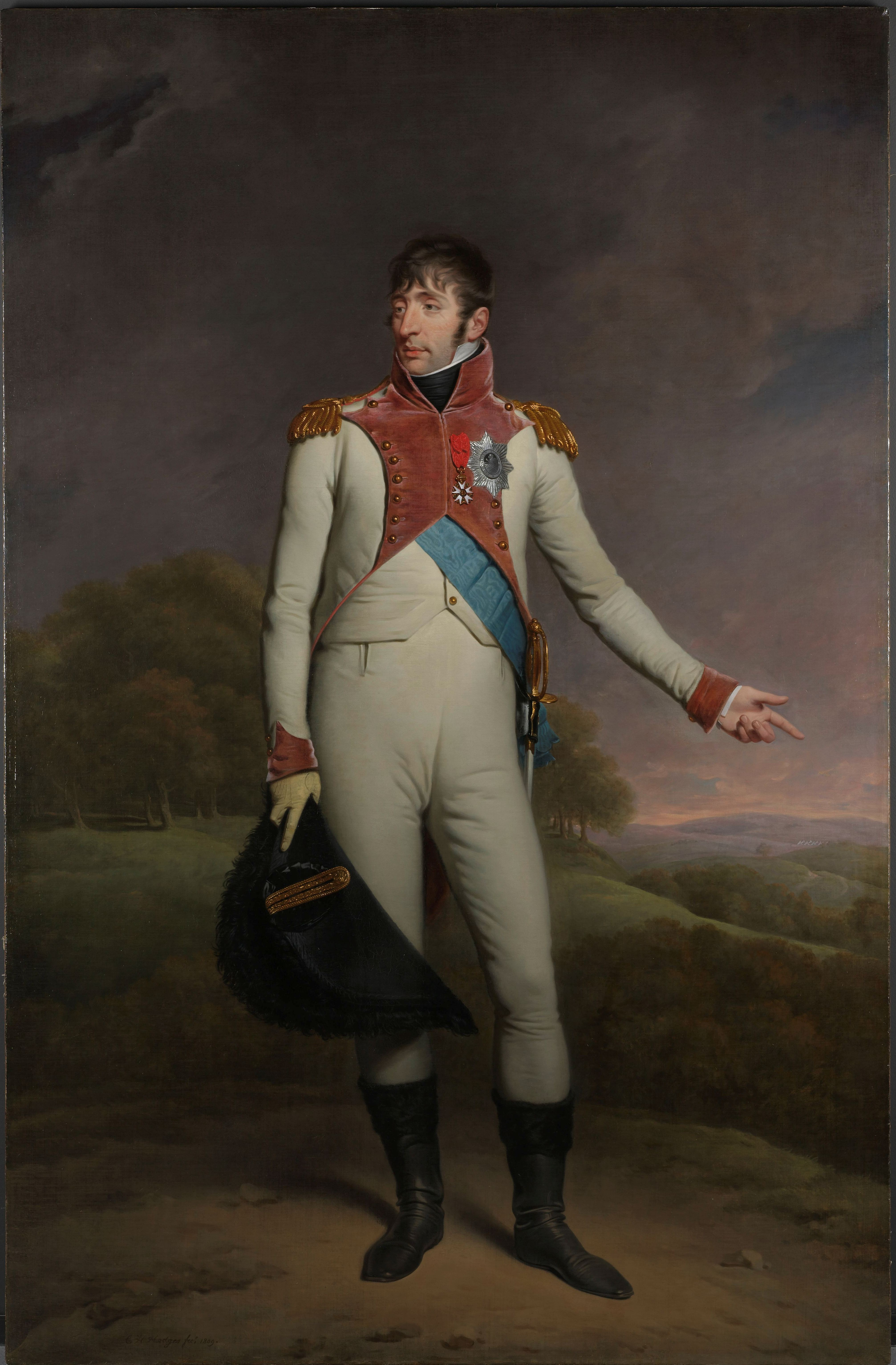
Louis Bonaparte

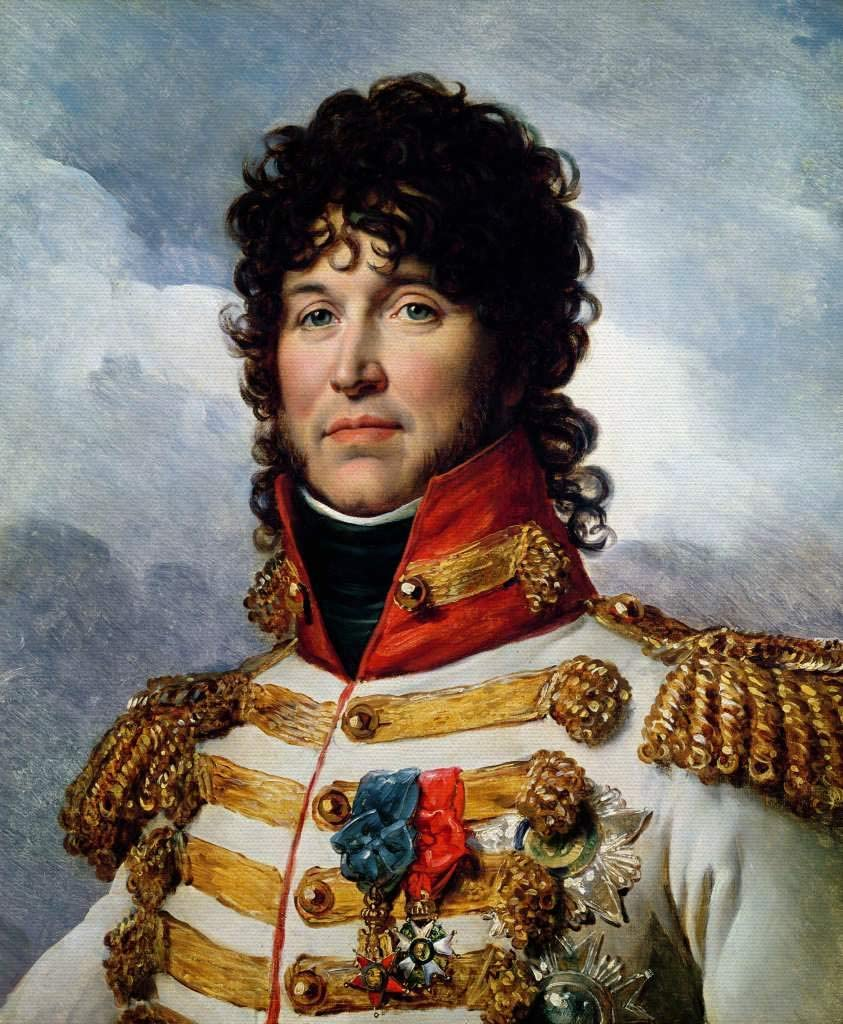
Joachim Murat

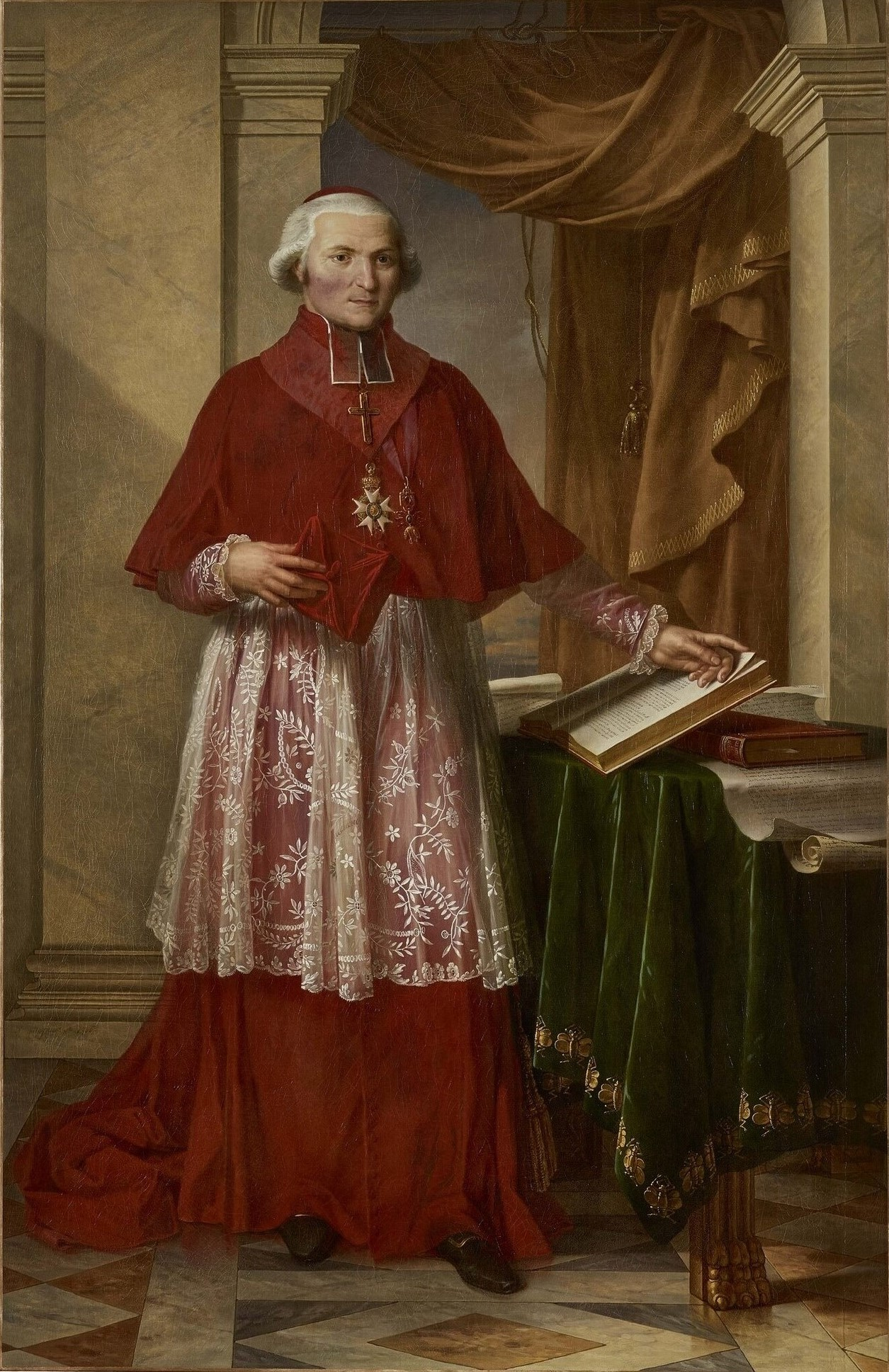
Joseph Fesch

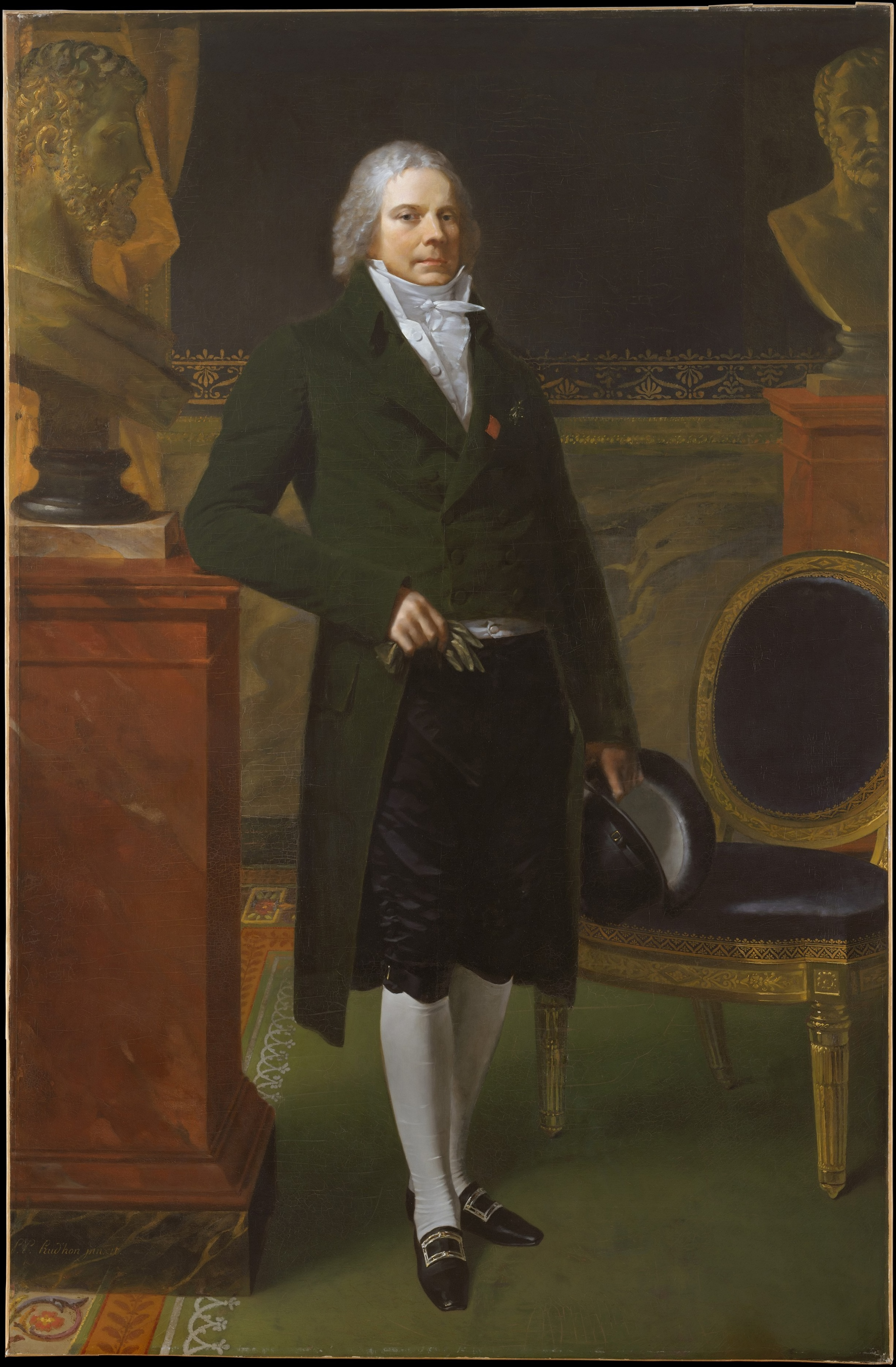
Charles Maurice de Talleyrand-Périgord

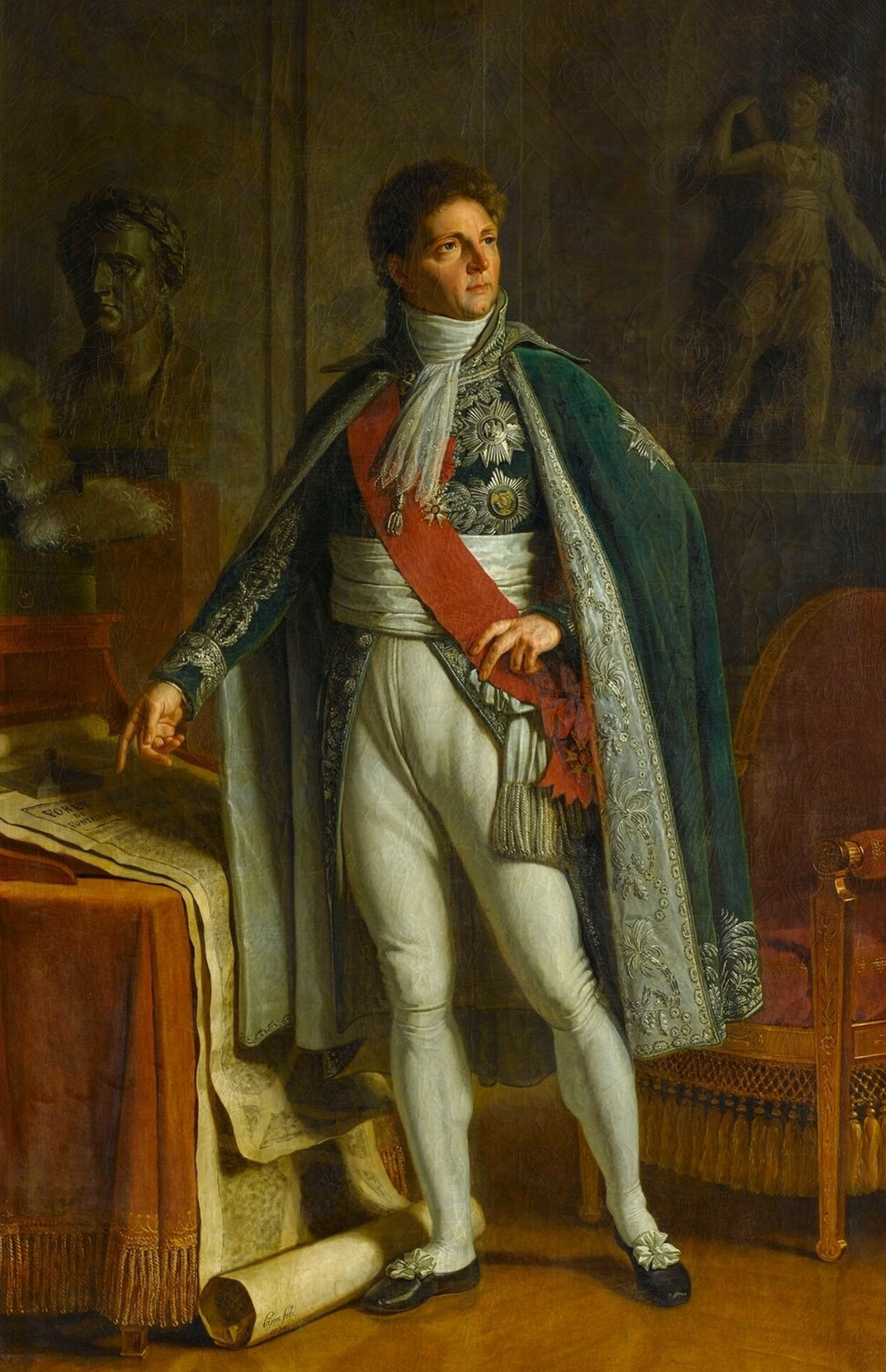
Louis-Alexandre Berthier

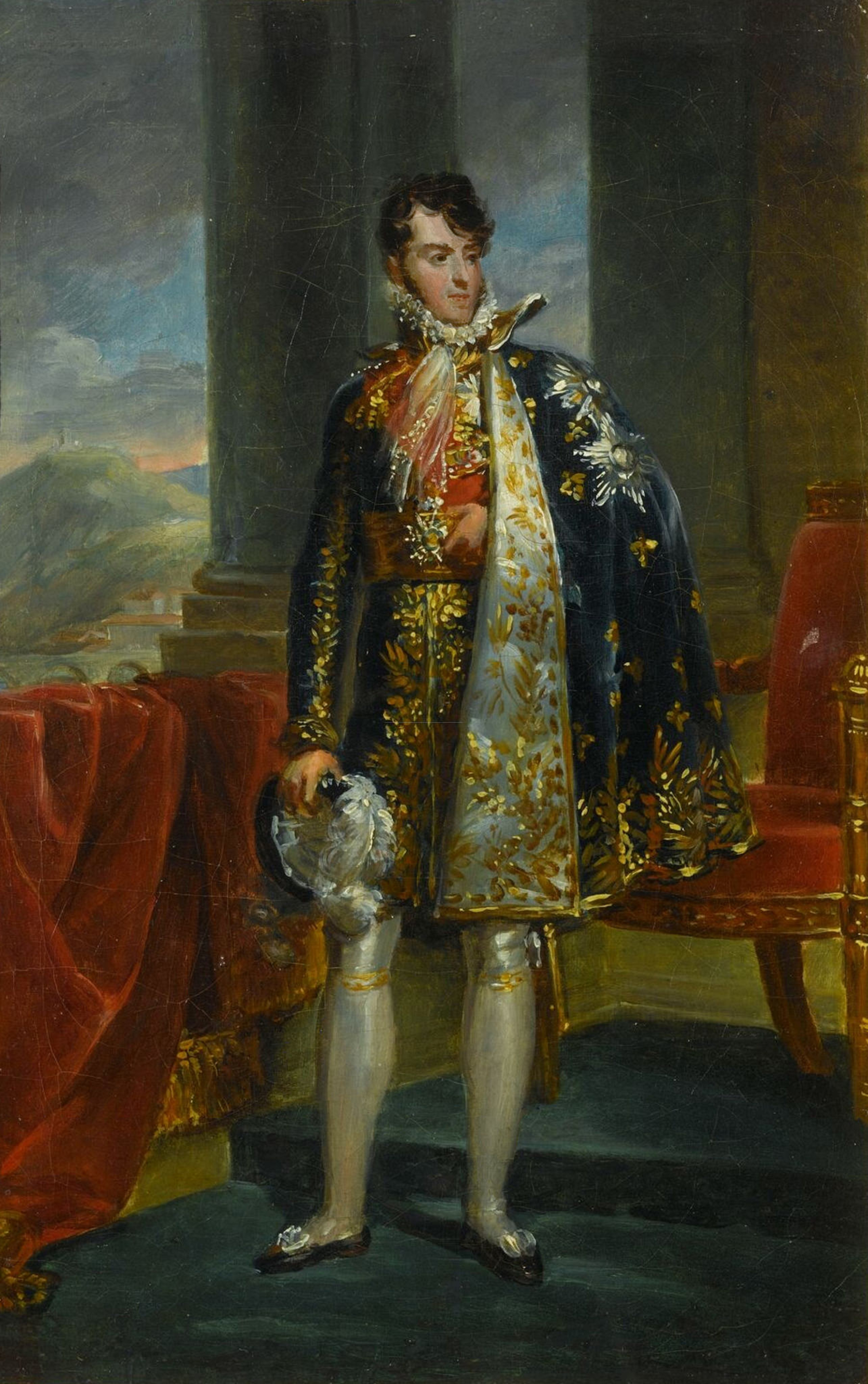
Camillo Borghese

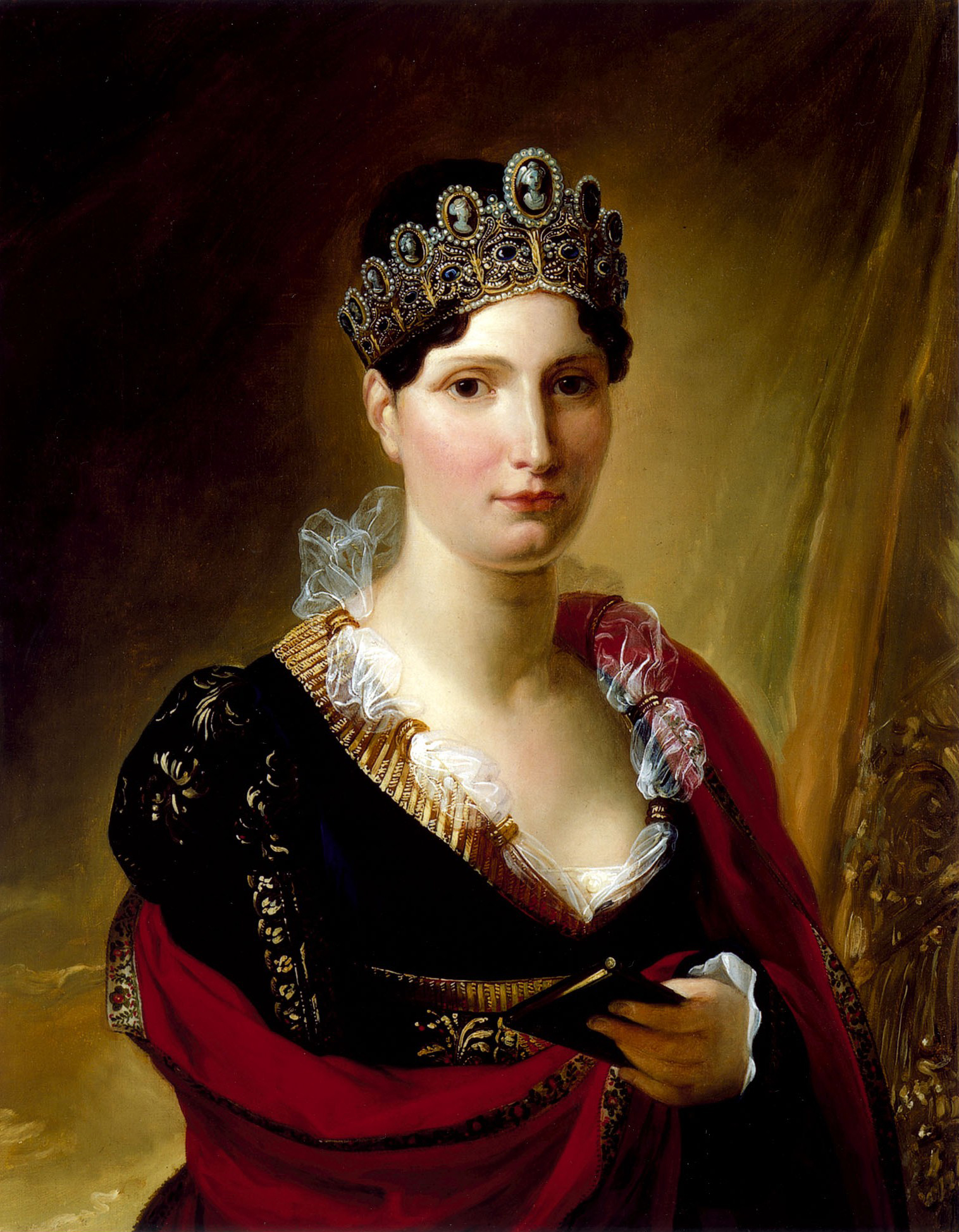
Elisa Bonaparte

== Bibliography ==
- Nicole Gotteri (1990). Grands Dignitaires, Ministres et Grands Officiers du Premier Empire (in French). Nouvelles Éditions Latines. ISBN 2-7233-0411-6.
- Jean F. Tulard (1989). Dictionnaire Napoléon (in French). French & European Publications, Incorporated. ISBN 0-8288-2491-6.
- Guida Myrl Jackson-Laufer (1999). Women Rulers Throughout the Ages: An Illustrated Guide. ABC-CLIO. ISBN 978-1-57607-091-8.
