= Confraternity of White Penitents in Montpellier =

Devout and Respectable Confraternity of White Penitents of Montpellier
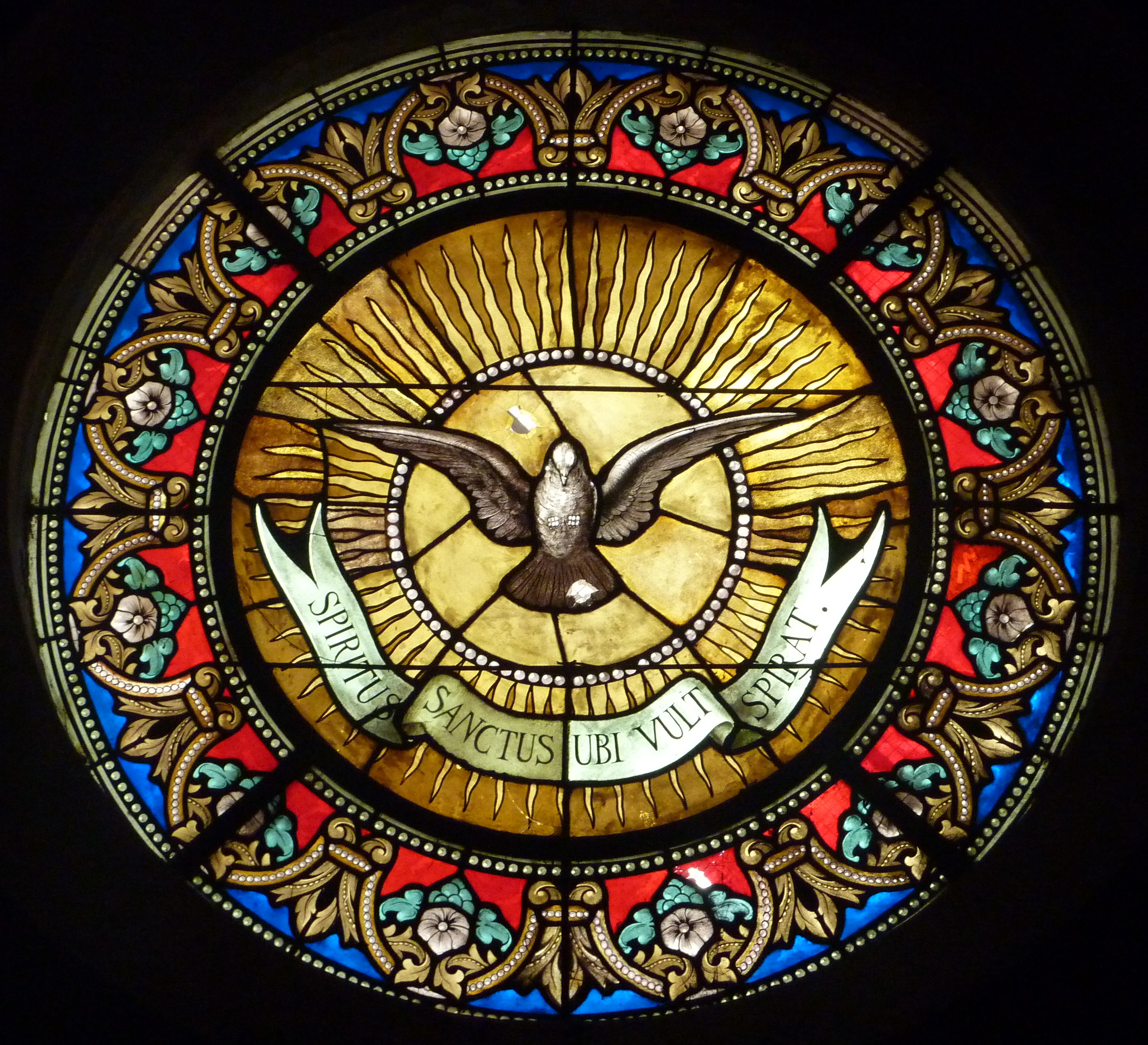
- Oculus of the chapel with the symbol of the Confraternity
- Established: 1517 (hypothetical foundation in 1230)
- Founder: Group of laypeople from an ancient medieval confraternity (legendary founder: Francis of Assisi)
- Type: Lay confraternity
- Location: Montpellier, France
- Affiliations: Catholic Church
- Website: penitents.fr

The Confraternity of White Penitents of Montpellier is a Catholic association mainly composed of laity. Its headquarters are located in Montpellier at the Sainte-Foy Chapel.

== Overview ==
Penitential confraternities are Catholic associations whose members, known as brothers or sisters, are primarily laity.

Penitents are not a religious order; each confraternity is independent and operates under the authority of the local bishop. Despite their autonomy, there are many similarities between confraternities, whose members gather regularly for prayer and charity. Some confraternities are exclusively male or female, but most, like the White Penitents of Montpellier, are mixed. Penitents' confraternities exist in Spain, southern France, Monaco, Italy, the Balkans, Belgium, Poland, Switzerland, and the Americas.

Montpellier has two Penitents’ confraternities, the White and the Blue. The "Devout and Respectable Confraternity of the White Penitents of Montpellier" is placed under "the invocation of the Holy Spirit, the protection of the Virgin Mary, especially dedicated to Saint Foy, and consecrated to the Sacred Heart." Its motto is "Spiritus Sanctus ubi vult spirat" ("The Holy Spirit breathes where it wills"). In its current form, it is a 1901 law association and is recognized as being of public utility. Its headquarters are at 14 Rue Jacques Cœur. Today, its main missions include:

- Prayer: Penitents regularly celebrate Masses, organize Eucharistic adoration and the Stations of the Cross in their chapel, and follow a specific prayer manual.
- Maintenance and restoration of the Sainte-Foy chapel, which is owned by the association.
- Maintenance and restoration of 14 public crosses in Montpellier, which the confraternity either owns or rents under 99-year leases.
- Accompaniment to the cemetery for members of the confraternity and others who request it.
- Assistance to various charitable organizations.

The confraternity comprises 49 members, men and women aged 25 to 103. All its officers are elected for one year, renewable. It is led by the prior, usually a layperson, and a twelve-member council. As in any association, certain functions, called offices, are entrusted to elected members, including the treasurer, master of ceremonies, secretary, choir leader, archivist, and syndics assigned specific tasks.

An association called "Maintenance of the Penitents of France" unites confraternities in France and Monaco on a voluntary basis. Additionally, an international structure, the Forum Omnium Gentium Confraternitatum, federates Penitents globally.

== The Chapel of the White Penitents ==
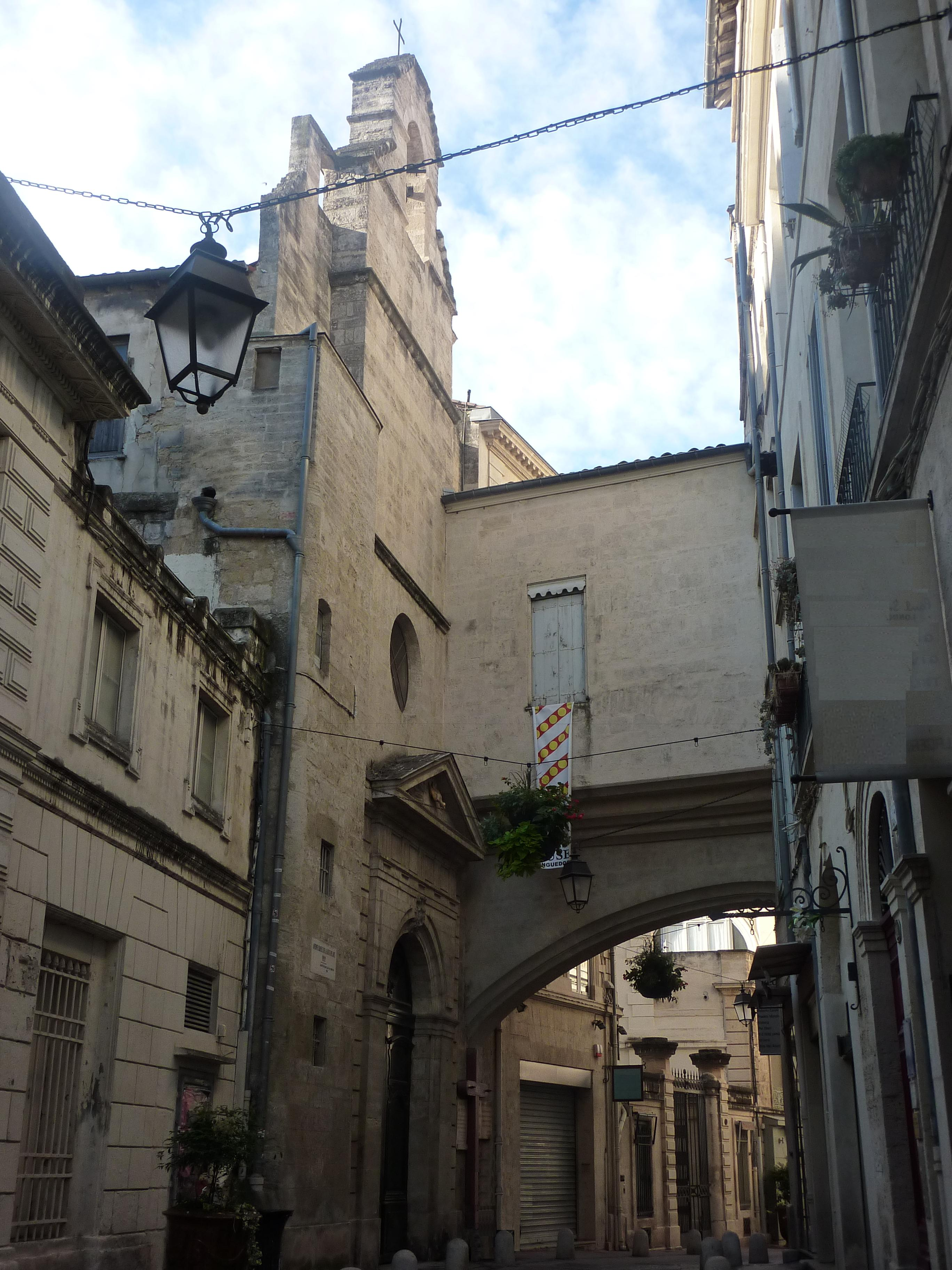
Facade of the chapel at 14 Rue Jacques Cœur, Montpellier

The Sainte-Foy chapel has been the headquarters of the White Penitents of Montpellier since 1518. First mentioned in 1228, it was likely built earlier, probably in the 12th century. However, little is known about its original appearance because it was destroyed during the French Wars of Religion.

After the city's siege by Louis XIII in 1622, the Sainte-Foy chapel was returned to the confraternity and rebuilt between 1623 and 1626. It features a significant 17th-century coffered ceiling. The walls were adorned with gilded wooden paneling by architect Augustin-Charles d'Aviler between 1697 and 1706. In the upper section, painted medallions and angel motifs alternate above the doors, created by Antoine Ranc and his workshop at the end of the 17th century. The lower paneling was repainted in the early 19th century to replace those lost during the French Revolution. The chapel's rococo-style vestibule and entrance portal, installed in 1747, showcase fine sculptures.

The Chapel of the White Penitents of Montpellier was classified as a historical monument on February 17, 1995.

== History of the Confraternity ==
This type of confraternity, or sodality, emerged in the Middle Ages from the desire of laity to adopt communal prayer practices akin to monks while maintaining family life and professional activities. They were recognized by religious authorities, including Popes Honorius III, Gregory X, and Nicholas IV.

According to an oral tradition, the White Penitents of Montpellier were founded in the 13th century following a hypothetical visit by Francis of Assisi. However, their medieval archives were destroyed during the French Wars of Religion, and their existence is only documented from 1517.

During the 17th and 18th centuries, the confraternity grew significantly, undertaking various charitable works, including assisting the sick, providing funeral services, and accompanying the condemned to execution. The organization remained active, though its fortunes fluctuated during the French Revolution, Second Empire, and into the 20th century.
