= Saint-Ilpize =

- Commune
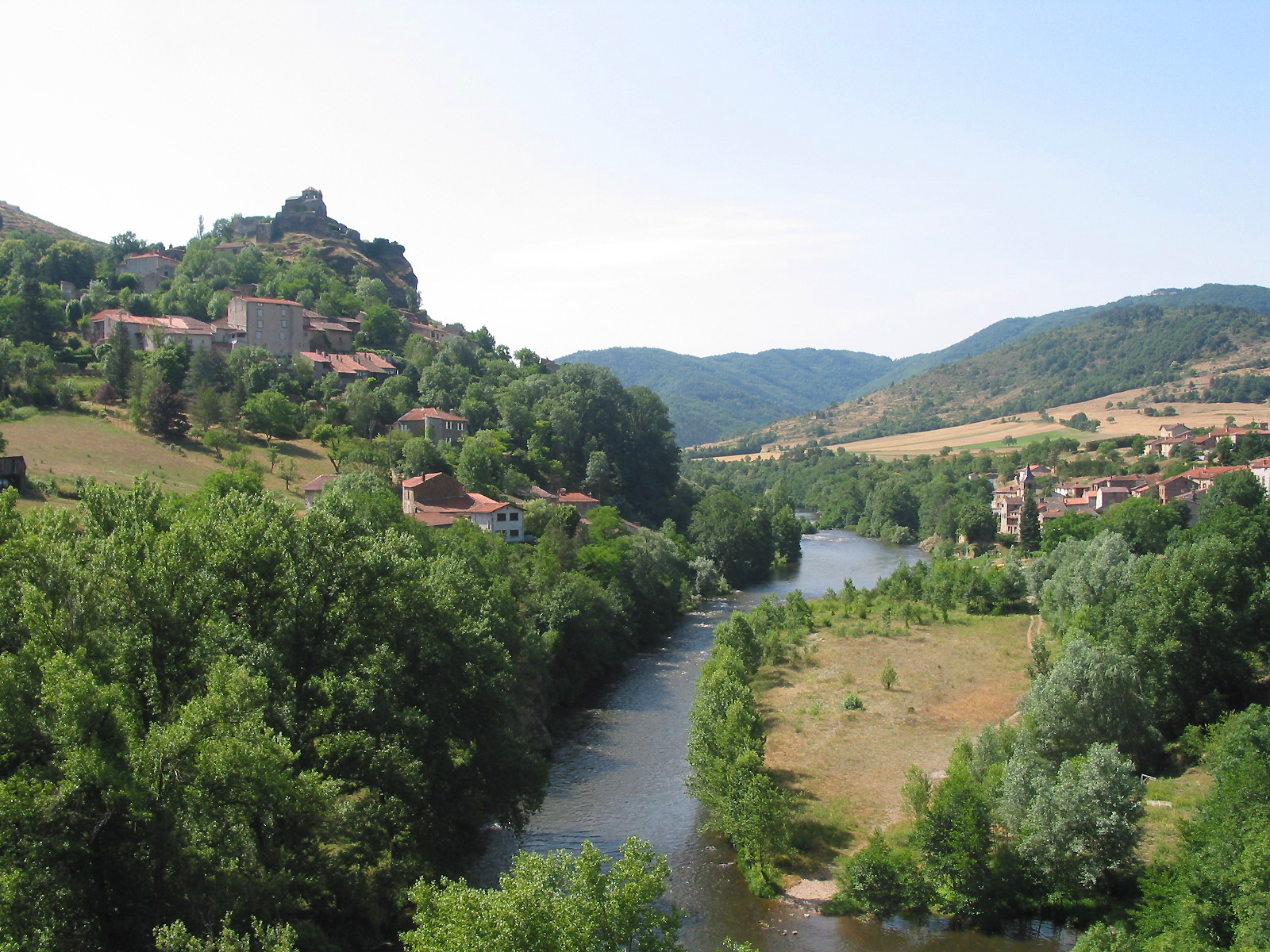
- Location of Saint-Ilpize
- Location within France Location within Auvergne-Rhône-Alpes
- Coordinates: 45°11′48″N 3°23′17″E
- Country: France
- Region: Auvergne-Rhône-Alpes
- Department: Haute-Loire
- Arrondissement: Brioude
- Canton: Pays de Lafayette

Government
  - Mayor (2020–2026): Martine Defay
- Area^{1}: 11.81 km^{2} (4.56 sq mi)
- Elevation: 450 m (1,480 ft)
- Highest elevation: 763 m (2,503 ft)
- Lowest elevation: 432 m (1,417 ft)
- Population (2023): 202
  - Density: 17.1/km^{2} (44.3/sq mi)
- Time zone: UTC+01:00 (CET)
  - Summer (DST): UTC+02:00 (CEST)
- INSEE/Postal code: 43195 /43380
- ^{1} French Land Register data, which excludes lakes, ponds, glaciers > 1 km^{2} (0.386 sq mi or 247 acres) and river estuaries.

Saint-Ilpize (French pronunciation: [sɛ̃.t‿ilpiz]; Occitan: Sent Ilpize) is a commune in the Haute-Loire department in south-central France.

== Population ==
The population data in the table and graph below refer to the commune of Saint-Ilpize in its geography at the given years. In 1845 the commune of Villeneuve-d'Allier was established from part of the commune of Saint-Ilpize.

Historical population

Year	Pop.	±% p.a.
1793	2,179	—
1800	2,384	+1.29%
1806	2,532	+1.01%
1821	2,579	+0.12%
1831	2,487	−0.36%
1836	2,401	−0.70%
1841	2,332	−0.58%
1846	1,206	−12.36%
1851	1,179	−0.45%
1856	1,126	−0.92%
1861	1,207	+1.40%
1866	1,211	+0.07%
1872	1,008	−3.01%
1876	1,000	−0.20%
1881	1,002	+0.04%
1886	979	−0.46%
1891	974	−0.10%
1896	856	−2.55%
1901	816	−0.95%

Year	Pop.	±% p.a.
1906	725	−2.34%
1911	650	−2.16%
1921	550	−1.66%
1926	469	−3.14%
1931	433	−1.58%
1936	390	−2.07%
1946	309	−2.30%
1954	277	−1.36%
1962	259	−0.84%
1968	209	−3.51%
1975	183	−1.88%
1982	188	+0.39%
1990	207	+1.21%
1999	205	−0.11%
2007	184	−1.34%
2012	185	+0.11%
2017	189	+0.43%
2023	202	+1.11%

Source: EHESS and INSEE (1968–2023)

== See also ==
- Communes of the Haute-Loire department
