= 1635 =

1635 in various calendars
- Gregorian calendar: 1635; MDCXXXV
- Ab urbe condita: 2388
- Armenian calendar: 1084; ԹՎ ՌՁԴ
- Assyrian calendar: 6385
- Balinese saka calendar: 1556–1557
- Bengali calendar: 1041–1042
- Berber calendar: 2585
- English Regnal year: 10 Cha. 1 – 11 Cha. 1
- Buddhist calendar: 2179
- Burmese calendar: 997
- Byzantine calendar: 7143–7144
- Chinese calendar: 甲戌年 (Wood Dog); 4332 or 4125 — to — 乙亥年 (Wood Pig); 4333 or 4126
- Coptic calendar: 1351–1352
- Discordian calendar: 2801
- Ethiopian calendar: 1627–1628
- Hebrew calendar: 5395–5396
- Hindu calendars
- Vikram Samvat: 1691–1692
- Shaka Samvat: 1556–1557
- Kali Yuga: 4735–4736
- Holocene calendar: 11635
- Igbo calendar: 635–636
- Iranian calendar: 1013–1014
- Islamic calendar: 1044–1045
- Japanese calendar: Kan'ei 12 (寛永１２年)
- Javanese calendar: 1556–1557
- Julian calendar: Gregorian minus 10 days
- Korean calendar: 3968
- Minguo calendar: 277 before ROC 民前277年
- Nanakshahi calendar: 167
- Thai solar calendar: 2177–2178
- Tibetan calendar: ཤིང་ཕོ་ཁྱི་ལོ་ (male Wood-Dog); 1761 or 1380 or 608 — to — ཤིང་མོ་ཕག་ལོ་ (female Wood-Boar); 1762 or 1381 or 609

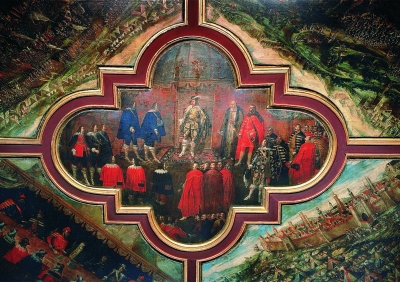
September 12: The Treaty of Stuhmsdorf is signed between Sweden and the Polish–Lithuanian Commonwealth.

1635 (MDCXXXV) was a common year starting on Monday of the Gregorian calendar and a common year starting on Thursday of the Julian calendar, the 1635th year of the Common Era (CE) and Anno Domini (AD) designations, the 635th year of the 2nd millennium, the 35th year of the 17th century, and the 6th year of the 1630s decade. As of the start of 1635, the Gregorian calendar was 10 days ahead of the Julian calendar, which remained in localized use until 1923.

== Events ==
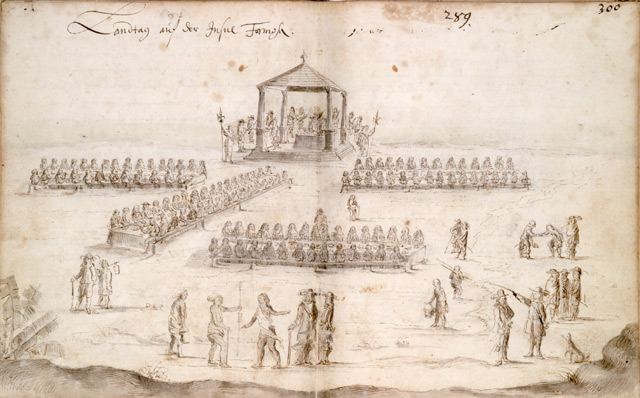
November 22: The Dutch pacification campaign on Formosa (now Taiwan) begins.

=== January–March ===
- January 23 – 1635 Capture of Tortuga: The Spanish Navy captures the Caribbean island of Tortuga off of the coast of Haiti after a three-day battle against the English and French Navy.
- January 25 – King Thalun moves the capital of Burma from Pegu to Ava.
- February 22 – The Académie française in Paris is formally constituted, as the national academy for the preservation of the French language.
- March 22 – The Peacock Throne of India's Mughal Empire is inaugurated in a ceremony in Delhi to support the seventh anniversary of Shah Jahan's accession to the throne as Emperor.
- March 26 – Philipp Christoph von Sötern, the Archbishop-Elector of Trier, is taken prisoner in a surprise attack by Spanish Habsburg troops, leading to a declaration of war against Spain by France and the beginning of the Franco-Spanish War.

=== April–June ===
- April 13 – Druze warlord Fakhr-al-Din II is executed in Constantinople.
- April 23 – Boston Latin School, the oldest school in what will become the United States of America, is founded in Boston, Massachusetts.
- May 19 – France declares war on Spain.
- May 30 – Thirty Years' War – The Peace of Prague is signed, which ends the German civil war aspect of the conflict.
- June 28 – France's Compagnie des Îles de l'Amérique begins its occupation of the Caribbean island of Guadeloupe, with Charles Liénard de L'Olive as its first Governor.

=== July–September ===
- July 31 – The Royal Mail service is made available to the public by Charles I of England.
- August 3 – Cossack rebel leader Ivan Sulyma stages a surprise attack on Poland's newly constructed Kodak fortress, and his raiders kill most of the 200 mercenaries stationed there. Sulyma and his allies are captured by the army of Stanisław Koniecpolski, and Sulyma is executed on December 12.
- August 25 – The Great Colonial Hurricane strikes Narragansett Bay as a possible Category 3 hurricane, killing over 46 people.
- September 12 – The Treaty of Sztumska Wieś is signed between Sweden and the Polish–Lithuanian Commonwealth.

=== October–December ===
- October 9 – Rhode Island founder Roger Williams is banished from Massachusetts Bay Colony as a religious dissident, after speaking out against punishments for religious offenses, and giving away Native American land.
- November 15 – Thomas Parr, dead at the alleged age of 152, is buried in Westminster Abbey.
- November 22 – The Dutch pacification campaign on Formosa, against Taiwanese aborigines, begins.
- December 23 – Shah Jahan, Emperor of India's Mughal Empire, issues a decree against Portuguese Jesuits, ordering that the Agra Church be demolished and barring them from attempting to convert Hindus and Muslims to the Christian faith, but allows them to conduct their religious ceremonies in private.

=== Date unknown ===
- Guadeloupe and Martinique are colonized by France.
- Dominica is claimed by France.
- The Ottomans are expelled from Yemen.
- In Edo period Japan, the Sakoku Edict of 1635 enforces isolationism. Japanese are forbidden to travel abroad and unauthorised Europeans forbidden to enter under penalty of death. Christianity (Catholicism) is absolutely prohibited. Foreign merchants – Chinese and those of the Dutch East India Company – are restricted to enclaves in Nagasaki and access by the Portuguese is completely forbidden: an imperial memorandum decrees, "Hereafter entry by the Portuguese galeota is forbidden. If they insist on coming, the ships must be destroyed and anyone aboard those ships must be beheaded."
- In the Mughal Empire, Shah Jahan's Pearl Mosque at Lahore Fort is completed.
- Nagyszombat University (predecessor of Budapest University) is established.
- Willem and Joan Blaeu publish the first edition of their Atlas Novus, in Amsterdam.

== Births ==
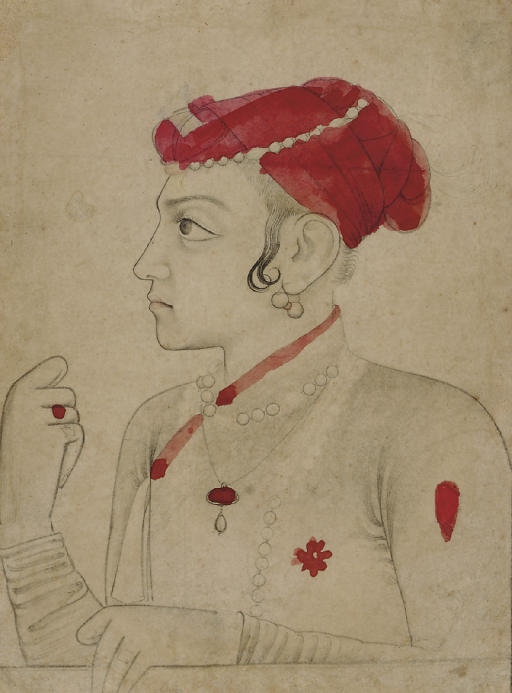
Sulaiman Shikoh

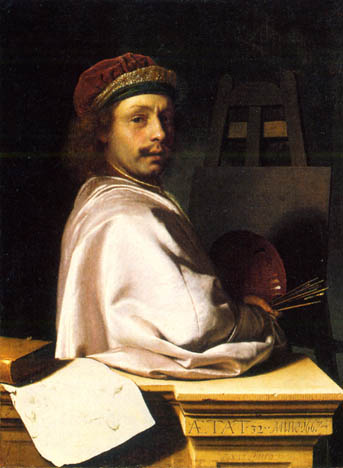
Frans van Mieris the Elder

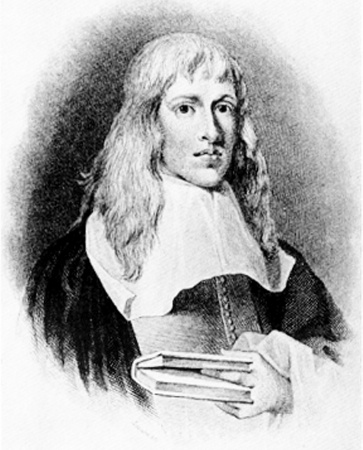
Francis Willughby

=== January–March ===
- January 2 – Wilhelmus à Brakel, Dutch theologian (d. 1711)
- January 6 – Charles Fane, 3rd Earl of Westmorland, Member of Parliament and House of Lords (d. 1691)
- January 8 – Luis Manuel Fernández de Portocarrero, Spanish Archbishop of Toledo (d. 1709)
- January 10 – Alexander Farnese, Prince of Parma, Italian military leader (d. 1689)
- January 13 – Philipp Spener, German Christian theologian known as the Father of Pietism (d. 1705)
- January 25 – Daniel Casper von Lohenstein, German writer, diplomat and lawyer (d. 1683)
- February 1 – Marquard Gude, German archaeologist and classical scholar (d. 1689)
- February 2 – William Godolphin, English politician (d. 1696)
- February 18 – Johan Göransson Gyllenstierna, Swedish statesman (d. 1680)
- February 21 – Thomas Flatman, British artist (d. 1688)
- February 25 – Walrad, Prince of Nassau-Usingen, German prince and founder of the line of Nassau-Usingen (d. 1702)
- March 2 – Eugene Maurice, Count of Soissons, Italian noble (d. 1673)
- March 4 – Emilia Butler, Countess of Ossory, English countess (d. 1688)
- March 10 – Jan van Buken, Flemish painter (d. 1690)
- March 15 – Sulaiman Shikoh, Mughal Empire emperor (d. 1662)
- March 31 – Patrick Gordon, Scottish-born Russian general, rear admiral (d. 1699)

=== April–June ===
- April 16 – Frans van Mieris the Elder, Dutch Golden Age genre and portrait painter (d. 1681)
- April 17 – Edward Stillingfleet, British theologian and scholar (d. 1699)
- April 25 – William Harbord, British politician (d. 1692)
- May 4 – Willem van Outhoorn, Dutch colonial governor (d. 1720)
- May 6 – Johann Joachim Becher, German chemist (d. 1682)
- May 9 – Augustus, Duke of Schleswig-Holstein-Sonderburg-Plön-Norburg (d. 1699)
- May 26 – Sir Thomas Lee, 1st Baronet, English politician (d. 1691)
- June 3 – Philippe Quinault, French writer (d. 1688)
- June 10 – Federico Caccia, Cardinal Archbishop of Milan (d. 1699)
- June 15 – Theodor Undereyk, German theologian (d. 1693)
- June 20 – Patrick Chaworth, 3rd Viscount Chaworth, Irish politician (d. 1693)
- June 21 – Laurent d'Arvieux, French traveler (d. 1702)

=== July–September ===
- July 11 – Gottfried Wilhelm Sacer, German jurist (d. 1699)
- July 13 – Jacques Bruyas, French missionary (d. 1712)
- July 19 – Francine Descartes, daughter of French philosopher René Descartes (d. 1640)
- July 23 – Adam Dollard des Ormeaux, iconic figure in the history of New France (d. 1660)
- July 28 – Robert Hooke, English scientist (d. 1703)
- July 29 – Christian Louis, Count of Waldeck-Wildungen (1645–1692) and Count of Waldeck and Pyrmont (1692–1706) (d. 1706)
- August 9 – Philip Traherne, British book collector (d. 1686)
- August 24 – Peder Griffenfeld, Danish statesman and royal favourite (d. 1699)
- August 30 – Pieter Spierinckx, Flemish painter (d. 1711)
- September 1 – Armand de Camboust, duc de Coislin, French lieutenant général (d. 1702)
- September 5 – Joseph Mezger, Austrian Benedictine (d. 1683)
- September 7 – Paul I, Prince Esterházy, Hungarian prince (d. 1713)
- September 9 – Andrzej Stech, Polish painter (d. 1697)
- September 17 – Peter Colleton, English politician (d. 1694)
- September 18 – Joana, Princess of Beira, Portuguese infanta (princess) (d. 1653)

Date unknown

- Luís de Vasconcelos e Sousa, 3rd Count of Castelo Melhor, Portuguese politician and prime minister (d. 1720)

=== October–December ===
- October 7
  - Christopher Comstock, American settler (d. 1702)
  - Roger de Piles, French painter (d. 1709)
- October 28 – Constantin Ranst de Jonge, son of Hieronimus Rans(t) (1607–1660) (d. 1714)
- November 1 – Johann Michael Vansleb, German theologian (d. 1679)
- November 3 – Johann Sturm, German philosopher (d. 1703)
- November 6 – Sir John Carew, 3rd Baronet, English Member of Parliament (d. 1692)
- November 11 – Justus Danckerts, Dutch artist (d. 1701)
- November 15 – Margaret Yolande of Savoy, duchess consort of Parma (d. 1663)
- November 19 – Mingju, Qing Dynasty statesman (d. 1708)
- November 22 – Francis Willughby, English biologist (d. 1672)
- November 27 – Madame de Maintenon, second wife of Louis XIV of France (d. 1719)
- December 11 – Sir William Twysden, 3rd Baronet, English politician (d. 1697)
- December 15 – Valentin Alberti, Silesian philosopher, theologian (d. 1697)
- December 23 – Ottaviano Jannella, Italian sculptor (d. 1661)
- December 28 – Elizabeth Stuart, second daughter of King Charles I of England (d. 1650)
- December 31 – Sir Robert Southwell, English diplomat (d. 1702)

Date unknown

- Thomas Betterton, English actor (d. 1710)
- Sir Henry Morgan, Welsh privateer (d. 1688)

== Deaths ==
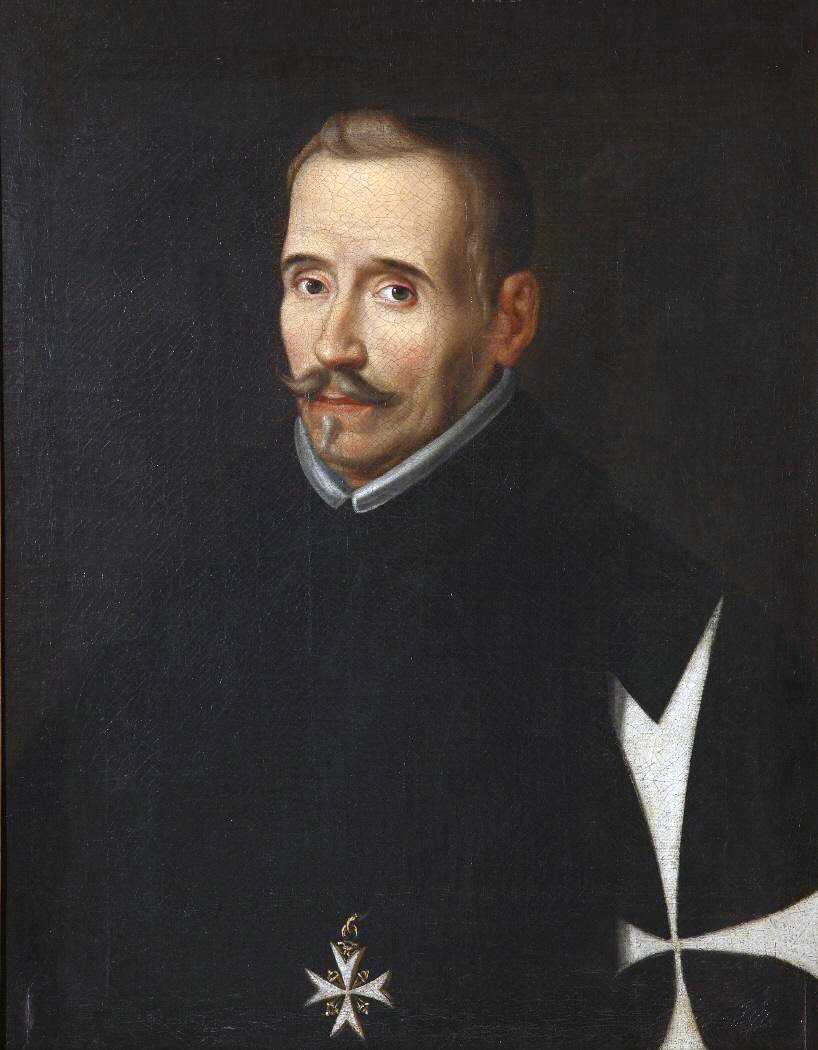
Lope de Vega

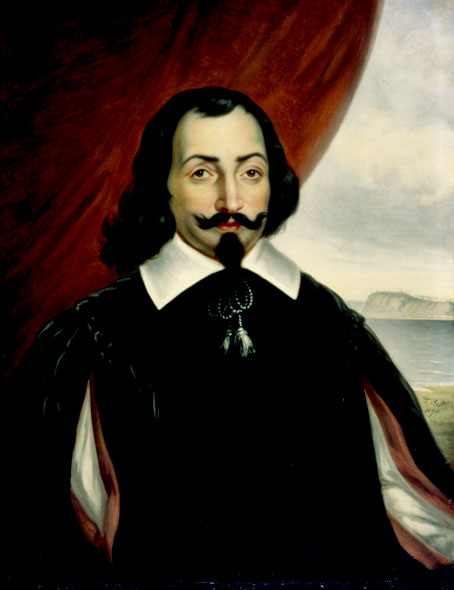
Samuel de Champlain

- January – Nef'i, Turkish poet and satirist (b. 1572)
- January 16 – Mariana de Jesús Torres, Spanish nun and mystic (b. 1563)
- February 19 – Franco Burgersdijk, Dutch logician (b. 1590)
- March – Thomas Randolph, English poet (b. 1605)
- March 27 – Robert Naunton, English politician (b. 1563)
- March 28 – Patrick Forbes, bishop in the Church of Scotland (b. 1564)
- April 13 – Fakhr-al-Din II, Ottoman Emir of Chouf (b. 1572)
- April 21 – Maria Musch, Dutch shipowner
- April 23 – Elizabeth Carey, Lady Berkeley, English courtier (b. 1576)
- April 25
  - Alessandro Tassoni, Italian poet and writer (b. 1565)
  - Julius Frederick, Duke of Württemberg-Weiltingen (b. 1588)
- April 27
  - Antonio Zapata y Cisneros, Spanish Catholic cardinal (b. 1550)
  - Wolfgang Ratke, German educational reformer (b. 1571)
- July 10 – Alonso Jerónimo de Salas Barbadillo, Spanish novelist and dramatist (b. c. 1580)
- August (bur.) – Richard Whitbourne, English colonist of Newfoundland (b. 1561)
- August 7 – Friedrich von Spee, German writer (b. 1591)
- August 9 – John II, Count Palatine of Zweibrücken (b. 1584)
- August 27 – Lope de Vega, Spanish poet and playwright (b. 1562)
- September 6 – Metius, Dutch mathematician and astronomer (b. 1571)
- September 10 – Johann Faulhaber, German mathematician (b. 1580)
- October 10 – Johann Ulrich Steigleder, German composer (b. 1593)
- October 24 – Wilhelm Schickard, German inventor (b. 1592)
- October 31 – Maria Amalia of Nassau-Dillenburg, German noble (b. 1582)
- November 5 – Jobst Herman, Count of Schaumburg (b. 1593)
- November 15 – Thomas Parr, English alleged oldest living man (b. 1483)
- November 25 – John Hall, English physician, son-in-law of William Shakespeare (b. 1575)
- December 1 – Melchior Teschner, German cantor, composer and theologian (b. 1584)
- December 9 – Sophie of Saxony, Duchess of Pomerania (b. 1587)
- December 19 – Albrecht of Hanau-Münzenberg, German nobleman (b. 1579)
- December 23 – Henry II, Count of Reuss-Gera (b. 1572)
- December 25 – Samuel de Champlain, French explorer and founder of Quebec (b. c.1567)
- date unknown
  - Iravikkutti Pillai, Venad leader in India (b. 1603)
  - Urszula Meyerin, politically influential Polish courtier (b. 1570)
- probable – Anthony Shirley, English traveller (b. 1565)
