= 1661 =

1661 in various calendars
- Gregorian calendar: 1661; MDCLXI
- Ab urbe condita: 2414
- Armenian calendar: 1110; ԹՎ ՌՃԺ
- Assyrian calendar: 6411
- Balinese saka calendar: 1582–1583
- Bengali calendar: 1067–1068
- Berber calendar: 2611
- English Regnal year: 12 Cha. 2 – 13 Cha. 2
- Buddhist calendar: 2205
- Burmese calendar: 1023
- Byzantine calendar: 7169–7170
- Chinese calendar: 庚子年 (Metal Rat); 4358 or 4151 — to — 辛丑年 (Metal Ox); 4359 or 4152
- Coptic calendar: 1377–1378
- Discordian calendar: 2827
- Ethiopian calendar: 1653–1654
- Hebrew calendar: 5421–5422
- Hindu calendars
- Vikram Samvat: 1717–1718
- Shaka Samvat: 1582–1583
- Kali Yuga: 4761–4762
- Holocene calendar: 11661
- Igbo calendar: 661–662
- Iranian calendar: 1039–1040
- Islamic calendar: 1071–1072
- Japanese calendar: Manji 4 / Kanbun 1 (寛文元年)
- Javanese calendar: 1583–1584
- Julian calendar: Gregorian minus 10 days
- Korean calendar: 3994
- Minguo calendar: 251 before ROC 民前251年
- Nanakshahi calendar: 193
- Thai solar calendar: 2203–2204
- Tibetan calendar: ལྕགས་ཕོ་བྱི་བ་ལོ་ (male Iron-Rat); 1787 or 1406 or 634 — to — ལྕགས་མོ་གླང་ལོ་ (female Iron-Ox); 1788 or 1407 or 635

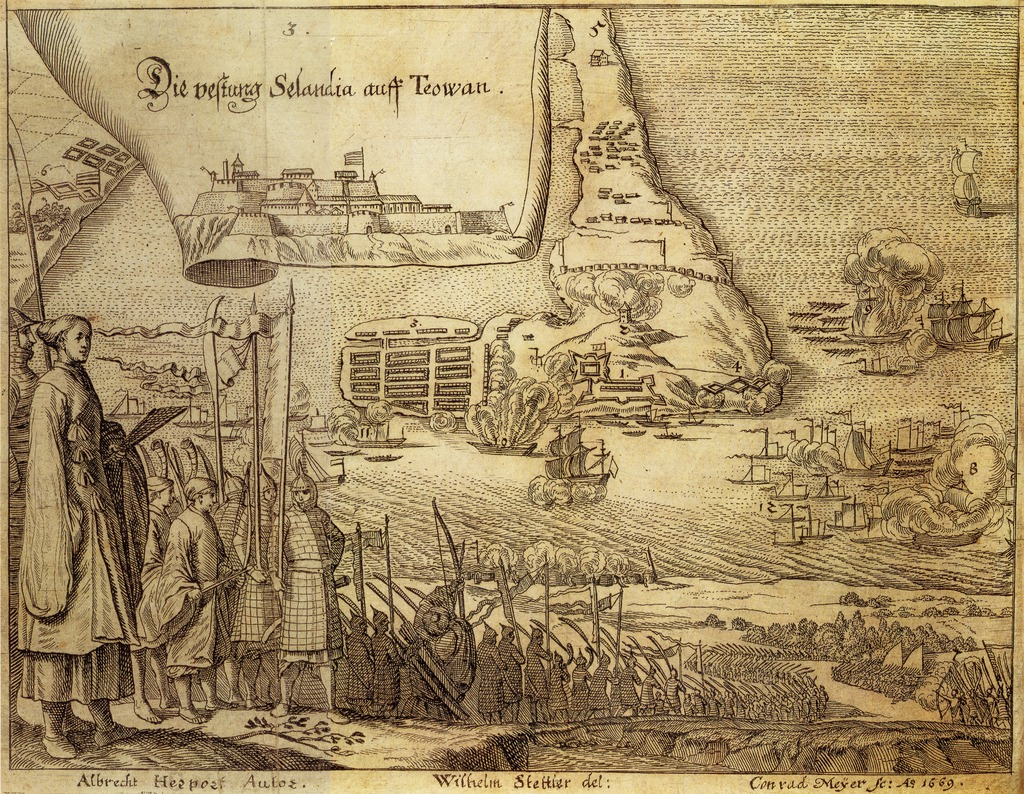
April 7: The Siege of Fort Zeelandia, the Dutch East India Company's capital of what is now Taiwan, is started by thousands of troops from Mainland China commanded by General Koxinga.

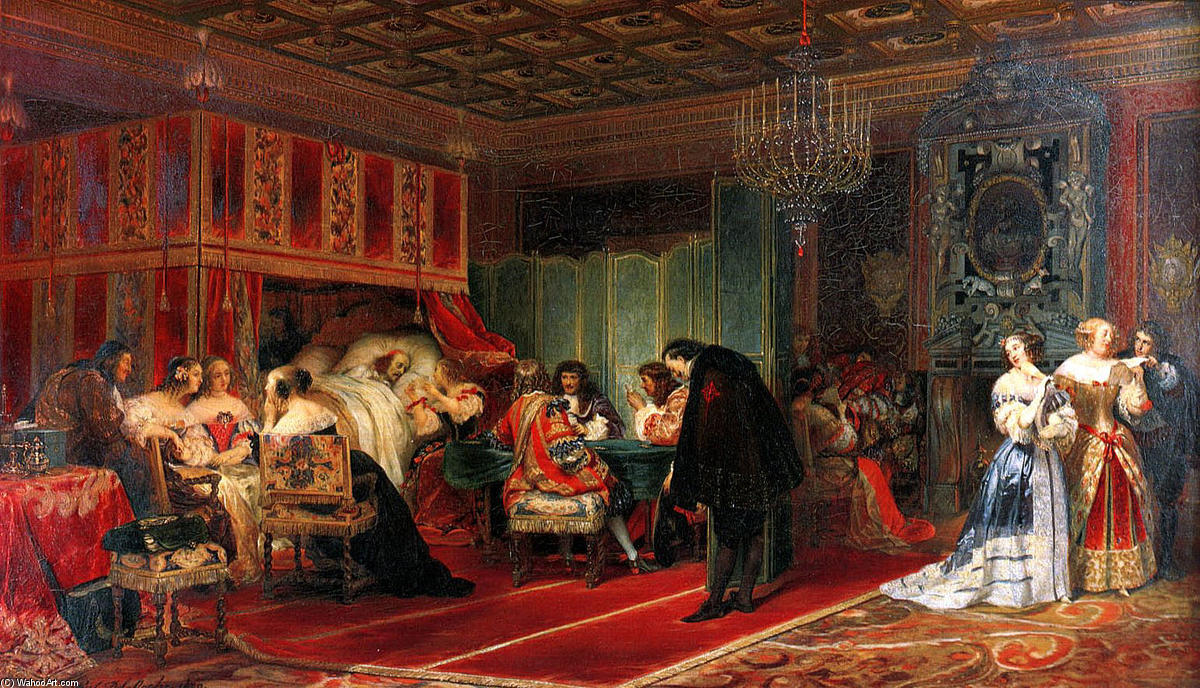
March 9: The death of Cardinal Mazarin clears the way for the rule of King Louis XIV in France.

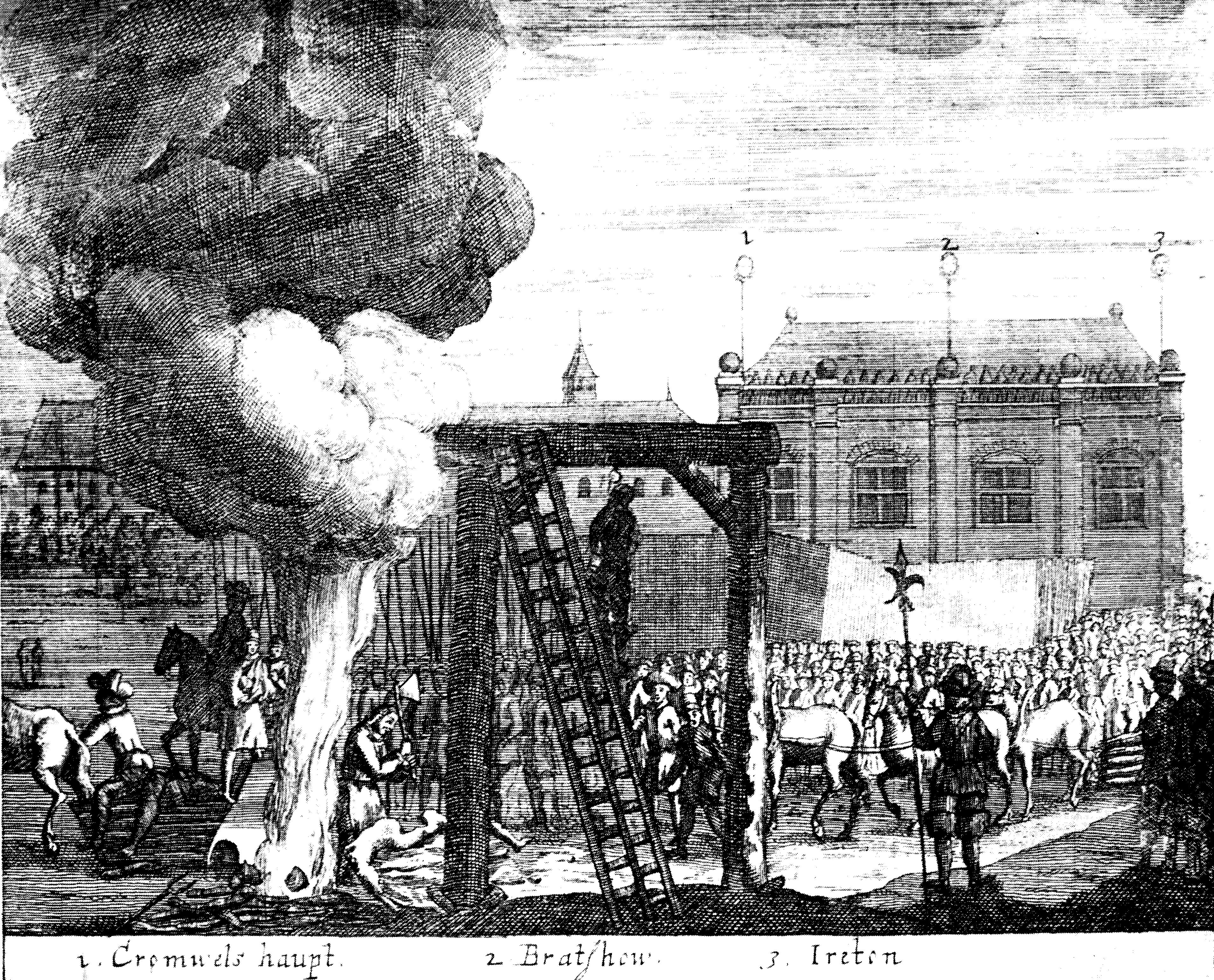
January 30: The posthumous execution of Oliver Cromwell is carried out more than two years after his death.

1661 (MDCLXI) was a common year starting on Saturday of the Gregorian calendar and a common year starting on Tuesday of the Julian calendar, the 1661st year of the Common Era (CE) and Anno Domini (AD) designations, the 661st year of the 2nd millennium, the 61st year of the 17th century, and the 2nd year of the 1660s decade. As of the start of 1661, the Gregorian calendar was 10 days ahead of the Julian calendar, which remained in localized use until 1923.

== Events ==
=== January–March ===
- January 6 – The Fifth Monarchists, led by Thomas Venner, unsuccessfully attempt to seize control of London; George Monck's regiment defeats them.
- January 29 – The Rokeby baronets, a British nobility title is created.
- January 30 – The body of Oliver Cromwell is exhumed and subjected to a posthumous execution in London, along with those of John Bradshaw and Henry Ireton.
- February 5 – The Shunzhi Emperor of the Chinese Qing Dynasty dies, and is succeeded by his 7-year-old son the Kangxi Emperor.
- February 7 – Shah Shuja, who was deprived of his claim to the throne of the Mughal Empire by his younger brother Aurangzeb, then fled to Burma, is killed by Indian troops in an attack on his residence at Arakan.
- February 14 – George Monck’s regiment becomes The Lord General's Regiment of Foot Guards in England (which later becomes the Coldstream Guards).
- March 9 – Following the death of his mentor, Cardinal Jules Mazarin, who had been Minister of State since before the birth of King Louis XIV, King Louis, now 22, starts to rule independently without need for a regent.
- March 23 – General Zheng Chenggong of China, known as "Koxinga" leads an invasion of the island of Taiwan, at the time under the control of the Dutch East India Company (VOC), bringing 25,000 soldiers and sailors on hundreds of boats to claim the territory.

=== April–June ===
- April 7 – The siege of Fort Zeelandia, the Dutch East India Company (VOC) headquarters on the Chinese island of Taiwan (near modern Taoyuan City) is started by Koxinga and his invading force from China.
- April 23 (May 3 N.S.) – King Charles II of England, Scotland, and Ireland is crowned in Westminster Abbey.
- May 8 – The "Cavalier Parliament", the longest serving Parliament in British history, is opened following the first parliamentary elections since the restoration of the monarchy in 1660. The first session of the House of Commons and the House of Lords lasts until June 30 and then reopens on November 20. The Cavalier Parliament continues meeting, without new elections, until being dissolved on January 24, 1679.
- May 11 – The Indian city and territory of Bombay is ceded by Portugal to England in accordance with the dowry of King Joao IV of Portugal for the marriage of his daughter Catherine to King Charles II of England.
- May 17 – Leaders of the indigenous Taiwanese villages in the plains and mountains of the Dutch-ruled island begin surrendering to the Chinese forces led by Koxinga and agreeing to hunt down and execute Dutch people on the island.
- May 27 – The Marquess of Argyll, one of the first of the Scottish-born people sentenced to death as a regicide for his role in the conviction and execution of King Charles I of England and Scotland in 1649, is beheaded at the Tolbooth Prison in Edinburgh using the "Scottish Maiden," almost immediately after his conviction of collaboration with the government of Oliver Cromwell. His head is then placed on a spike outside the prison.
- June 1 – At Edinburgh, the public execution of Presbyterian minister James Guthrie, followed by Captain William Govan, takes place at the Mercat Cross at Parliament Square, days after both have been convicted of treason for their roles in the execution of King Charles I. The heads are severed from the corpses and displayed on spikes in the square.
- June 3 – Pye Min, younger brother of King Pindale Min of Burma, leads a bloody coup d'etat and ascends the throne. Pindale Min and his family (including his primary wife, a son and a grandson) are drowned in the Chindwin River. Pye Min reigns until 1672.
- June 14 – General Zheng Chenggong of China takes control of most of the island of Taiwan from the Dutch East India Company and proclaims the Kingdom of Tungning, with himself as the ruler.
- June 23 – The "Marriage Treaty" is signed between representatives of King Charles II of England and King João IV of Portugal, providing a military alliance between the two kingdoms and a marriage between Charles of the House of Stuart and João's daughter Catherine of the House of Braganza on May 21, 1662. The treaty also sets the transfer of Portuguese territory in India (at Bombay) and in North Africa (Tangier) to England as well as military aid from England to Portugal.
- June 28 – The innovative Lincoln's Inn Fields Theatre opens in London with the first system for interchangeable scenery on a stage in the British Isles, and a production of William Davenant's opera The Siege of Rhodes.

=== July–September ===
- July 1 – The war between the empires of Russia and Sweden is ended with the signing of the Treaty of Cardis in what is now the Estonian city of Kärde. Russia returns those portions of Livonia and Ingria that it had taken earlier from Sweden.
- August 6 – Portugal and the Dutch Republic sign the Treaty of The Hague, whereby the Dutch Republic's South American colony of Nieuw-Holland is sold to Portugal for the equivalent of roughly 63,000 kilograms (139,000 lb) of gold, and incorporated into Brazil. The territory includes much of what will later become the Brazilian states of Ceará, Maranhão, Paraíba, Pernambuco and Rio Grande do Norte. Among the major Dutch settlements lost are Mauritsstad (Recife), Fort Schoonenborch (Fortaleza), Nieuw-Amsterdam (Natal), and Frederikstadt (João Pessoa).
- September 5 – Nicolas Fouquet, the Superintendent of Finances for France, is arrested in Nantes and charged with embezzlement of the state treasury. Spared the death penalty by a jury, Fouquet spends the rest of his life in prison until his death in 1680.

=== October–December ===
- October 6 – Guru Har Krishan becomes eighth of the ten Sikh gurus, and at age 5 the youngest, following the death of his father Guru Har Rai.
- October 31 – Köprülüzade Fazıl Ahmed Pasha is appointed as the new Grand Vizier of the Ottoman Empire at the request of his late father, the Grand Vizier Köprülü Mehmed Pasha, serving under the Sultan Mehmed IV for 15 years and continuing the Köprülü family dynasty whose members will serve as Viziers until 1711.
- November 4 – Polish and Lithuanian forces, led by King Jan II Kazimierz (who is also the Grand Duke of Lithuania) defeat the Russian Army at the Battle of Kushliki.
- December 14 – Prince Murad Bakhsh, younger brother of the Mughal Emperor Aurangzeb, is executed at Gwailor Fort on order of his brother.
- December 16 – Abraham Cowley's comedy The Cutter of Coleman Street premieres at the Lincoln's Inn Fields Playhouse in London as a production of the Duke's Company.
- December 21 – General Wu Sangui of China arrives in Burma with 20,000 troops and demands that the Burmese surrender Yongli, the last of the Ming dynasty rulers of Southern China before the Qing dynasty consolidated its rule. Burma's King Pye Min hands Yongli over to General Wu on January 15, and Yongli is subsequently executed.
- December 24 – The Indian city of Quilon (now Kollam in the Kerala state), ruled by Portugal since 1498, is captured by the Dutch East India Company.

=== Date unknown ===
- The first modern bank notes are issued in Stockholm, Sweden.
- Great Clearance in China: evacuation of Guangdong is required.

== Births ==
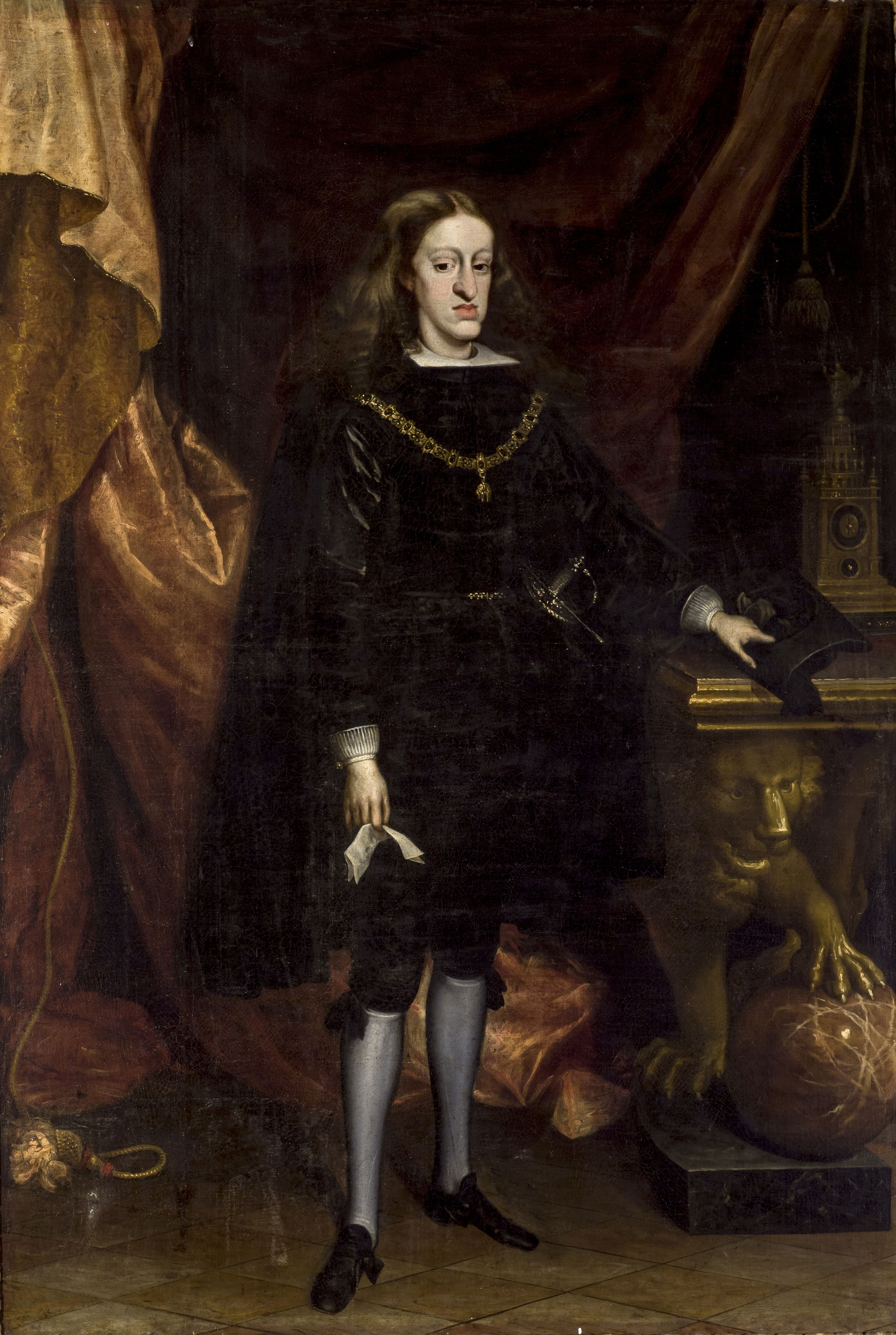
Charles II of Spain

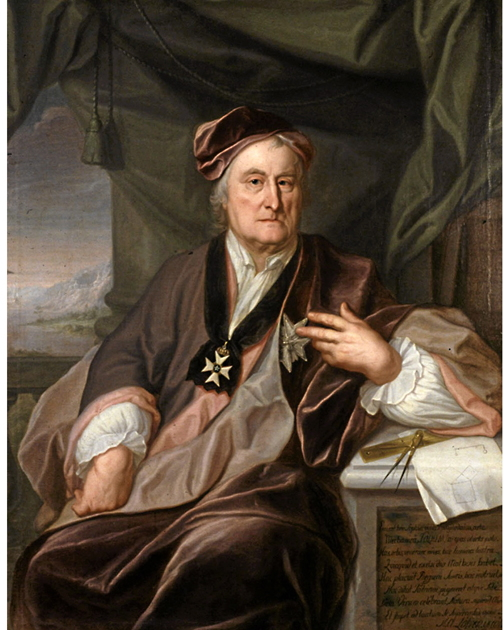
Christopher Polhem

- January 15 – James Barry, Irish politician (d. 1725)
- January 21 – Peter Le Neve, English herald and antiquary (d. 1729)
- January 22 – Joseph Fleuriau d'Armenonville, French politician (d. 1728)
- January 25 – Alexander zu Dohna-Schlobitten, German general (d. 1728)
- January 25 – Antonio I, Prince of Monaco, Monegasque prince (d. 1731)
- January 30 – Charles Rollin, French historian (d. 1741)
- February 12 – Daniel d'Auger de Subercase, French naval officer, governor of Newfoundland (d. 1732)
- February 20 – William Digby, 5th Baron Digby, English politician, baron (d. 1752)
- February 24 – Alexandre-François Desportes, French painter (d. 1743)
- February 25 – Anne Lennard, Countess of Sussex, English Countess (d. 1721)
- February 28 – Tripo Kokolja, Venetian painter (d. 1713)
- March 19 – Francesco Gasparini, Italian composer and teacher (d. 1727)
- March 25 – Paul de Rapin, French historian (d. 1725)
- April 11 – Antoine Coypel, French painter (d. 1722)
- April 13 – Jacques L'enfant, French Protestant pastor (d. 1728)
- April 14 – Sir Thomas Molyneux, 1st Baronet, Irish politician (d. 1733)
- April 16 – Charles Montagu, 1st Earl of Halifax, English poet and statesman (d. 1715)
- April 21 – Georg Joseph Kamel, Jesuit missionary and botanist (d. 1706)
- April 23 – Issachar Berend Lehmann, German-Jewish banker, Court Jew in Hanover (d. 1730)
- April 30 – Louis Armand I, Prince of Conti (d. 1685)
- May 3 – Antonio Vallisneri, Italian scientist (d. 1730)
- May 7
  - George Clarke, English politician, architect (d. 1736)
  - Sophie Marie of Hesse-Darmstadt, only Duchess by marriage of Saxe-Eisenberg (d. 1712)
- May 25 – Claude Buffier, French philosopher and historian (d. 1737)
- June 1
  - Gaspard Rigaud, French painter (d. 1705)
  - Louis Bartholomew Załuski, Polish cardinal, Auxiliary Bishop of Przemysl (d. 1721)
- June 6 – Giacomo Antonio Perti, Italian composer (d. 1756)
- June 9 – Tsar Feodor III of Russia (d. 1682)
- June 24 – Hachisuka Tsunanori, Japanese daimyō who ruled the Tokushima Domain (d. 1730)
- July 7 – Henri, Duke of Elbeuf, member of the House of Lorraine (d. 1748)
- July 11 – Charles, Prince of Commercy, French field marshal (d. 1702)
- July 15 – Pierre Le Moyne d'Iberville, French founder of the colony of Louisiana (d. 1706)
- July 29 – Christian Heinrich, Margrave of Brandenburg-Bayreuth-Kulmbach, German prince (d. 1708)
- July 31 – Ignaz Agricola, German historian (d. 1729)
- August 8 – Johann Matthias von der Schulenburg, German aristocrat and general (d. 1747)
- August 11 – William Churchill, English politician (d. 1737)
- August 15 – King Sukjong of Joseon (d. 1720)
- August 22 – Joseph Sheffield, Colonial Rhode Island Attorney General (d. 1706)
- August 31
  - Philippe Emanuel, Prince of Hornes (d. 1718)
  - Charles Granville, 2nd Earl of Bath, English diplomat (d. 1701)
- September 2
  - Georg Böhm, German composer and organist (d. 1733)
  - Heinrich, Duke of Saxe-Merseburg (d. 1738)
- September 7 – Gunno Dahlstierna, Swedish poet (d. 1709)
- September 23 – Christiana Oxenstierna, Swedish noble (d. 1701)
- September 28 – Mehr-un-Nissa, daughter of Mughal emperor Aurangzeb and his concubine Aurangabadi Mahal (d. 1706)
- October 1 – Sir Matthew Dudley, 2nd Baronet, English Member of Parliament (d. 1721)
- October 4 – Jean-Paul Le Gardeur, French explorer, New France soldier (d. 1738)
- October 6 – William Dunbar, Scottish bishop (d. 1746)
- October 11 – Melchior de Polignac, French diplomat and cardinal (d. 1742)
- October 22 – Margaret Holles, Duchess of Newcastle-upon-Tyne, English noblewoman, fourth of six children of Henry Cavendish (d. 1717)
- October 27 – Fyodor Apraksin, Russian admiral (d. 1728)
- November 1
  - Florent Carton Dancourt, French dramatist and actor (d. 1725)
  - Louis, Grand Dauphin, eldest son and heir of Louis XIV of France (d. 1711)
- November 4 – Karl III Philip, Elector Palatine (d. 1742)
- November 6 – King Charles II of Spain (d. 1700)
- November 13 – Erdmuthe Dorothea of Saxe-Zeitz, consort of Duke Christian II of Saxe-Merseburg (d. 1720)
- November 15 – Christoph von Graffenried, Swiss settler in America (d. 1743)
- November 15 – Henri, Count of Brionne, French noble (d. 1713)
- November 18 – Elisabeth Henriette of Hesse-Kassel, daughter of William VI (d. 1683)
- November 28 – Margravine Dorothea Charlotte of Brandenburg-Ansbach, German noblewomen (d. 1705)
- November 28 – Edward Hyde, 3rd Earl of Clarendon, British Governor of New York and New Jersey (d. 1723)
- December 3 – Nathaniel Gould, English politician (d. 1728)
- December 5 – Robert Harley, 1st Earl of Oxford and Earl Mortimer, English statesman (d. 1724)
- December 8 – Kenneth Mackenzie, 4th Earl of Seaforth, Scottish Jacobite nobleman (d. 1701)
- December 18 – Christopher Polhem, Swedish scientist and inventor (d. 1751)
- date unknown – Rijkuo-Maja, Sámi noaidi (d. 1757)

== Deaths ==
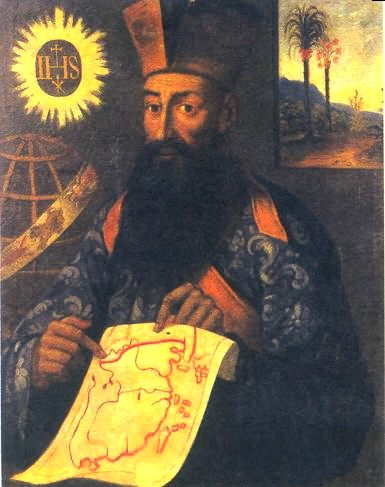
Martino Martini

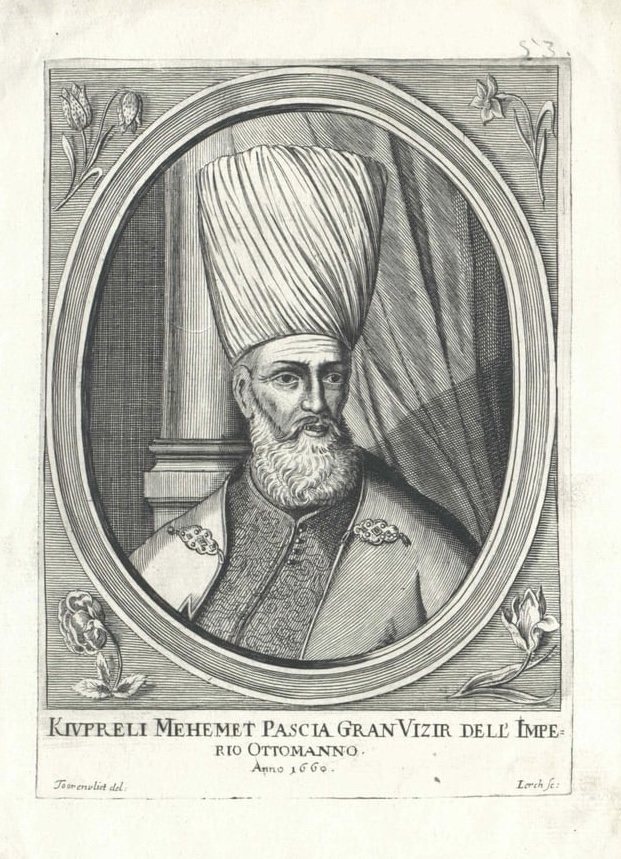
Köprülü Mehmed Pasha

- January 19 – Thomas Venner, English Fifth Monarchist (executed)
- January 25 – John Hele, English politician (b. 1626)
- January 29 – Bartolomeo Gennari, Italian painter (b. 1594)
- February 2 – Lucas Holstenius, German humanist (b. 1596)
- February 5 – Shunzhi Emperor of China (b. 1638)
- February 7 – Shah Shuja, second son of Shah Jahan and Mumtaz Mahal (b. 1616)
- March 1 – Richard Zouch, English jurist (b. 1590)
- March 9 – Cardinal Mazarin, French cardinal and statesman (b. 1602)
- March 23 – Pieter de Molijn, Dutch painter (b. 1595)
- April 4 – Alexander Leslie, 1st Earl of Leven, Scottish soldier(b. c. 1580)
- April 5 – John Webster, colonial settler and governor of Connecticut (b. 1590)
- April 7 – William Brereton, English soldier and politician (b. 1604)
- April 11 – Lady Mary Bankes, English defender of Corfe Castle (b. 1598)
- April 19 – Joachim Gersdorff, Danish politician (b. 1611)
- May 5 – Charles Stuart, Duke of Cambridge (b. 1660)
- May 27 – Archibald Campbell, 1st Marquess of Argyll, Scottish dissenter (beheaded) (b. 1607)
- June 3 – Gottfried Scheidt, German composer (b. 1593)
- June 6 – Martino Martini, Italian Jesuit missionary (b. 1614)
- June 11 – George II, Landgrave of Hesse-Darmstadt (1626–1661) (b. 1605)
- June 13 – Henry Carey, 2nd Earl of Monmouth, English politician (b. 1595)
- June 21 – Andrea Sacchi, Italian painter of High Baroque Classicism (b. 1599)
- July 7 – Adriaan Heereboord, Dutch philosopher (b. 1613)
- July 9 – Frederick, Count Palatine of Zweibrücken (b. 1616)
- July 17 – Alonso Perez de Leon, Spanish conquistador, explorer, man of letters (b. 1608)
- August 6 – Marie Angélique Arnauld, French abbess of the Abbey of Port-Royal (b. 1591)
- August 7
  - Benedetta Carlini, Italian mystic (b. 1590)
  - Jin Shengtan, Chinese editor, writer and critic (b. 1608)
- August 16 – Thomas Fuller, English churchman and historian (b. 1608)
- August 18 – Robert Gordon of Straloch, Scottish cartographer (b. 1580)
- August 23 – Tokugawa Yorifusa, Japanese nobleman (b. 1603)
- September 7 – James Livingstone, 1st Viscount Kilsyth of Scotland (b. 1616)
- September 8 – Edward Vaux, 4th Baron Vaux of Harrowden, English baron (b. 1588)
- September 11 – Jan Fyt, Flemish Baroque painter (b. 1611)
- October 4 – Jacqueline Pascal, French child prodigy, sister of Blaise Pascal (b. 1625)
- October 6 – Guru Har Rai, Sikh guru (b. 1630)
- October 9 – Sir John Norwich, 1st Baronet, English Member of Parliament (b. 1613)
- October 15 – Jean de La Haye, French preacher and biblical scholar (b. 1593)
- October 25 – Lucas de Wael, Flemish painter (b. 1591)
- October 28
  - Agustín Moreto y Cavana, Spanish playwright (b. 1618)
  - Ottavio Amigoni, Italian painter (b. 1606)
- October 31 – Köprülü Mehmed Pasha, Ottoman Grand Vizier (b. c. 1575)
- November 1 – Philip Prospero, Prince of Asturias, heir apparent to the Spanish throne (b. 1657)
- November 2 – Daniel Seghers, Flemish Jesuit brother and painter (b. 1590)
- November 10 – Bernardino Spada, Italian Catholic cardinal (b. 1594)
- November 11 – David Ryckaert III, Flemish painter (b. 1612)
- November 19
  - Lars Kagg, Swedish count and military officer (b. 1595)
  - Brian Walton, English clergyman and scholar (b. 1600)
- December 7 – Ariana Nozeman, Dutch actress (b. ca. 1627)
- December 10 – Ottaviano Jannella, Italian sculptor (b. 1635)
- December 14 – Murad Bakhsh, Mughal prince (b. 1624)
- December 22 – Hoshina Masasada, Japanese daimyō (b. 1588)
- December 29 – Antoine Girard de Saint-Amant, French poet (b. 1594)
- date unknown – Jacomina de Witte, politically influential Dutch woman (b. 1582)
