= Treaties of Nijmegen =

1678–79 treaties ending the Franco-Dutch War

Treaties of Peace of Nijmegen
Traités de Paix de Nimègue (French)
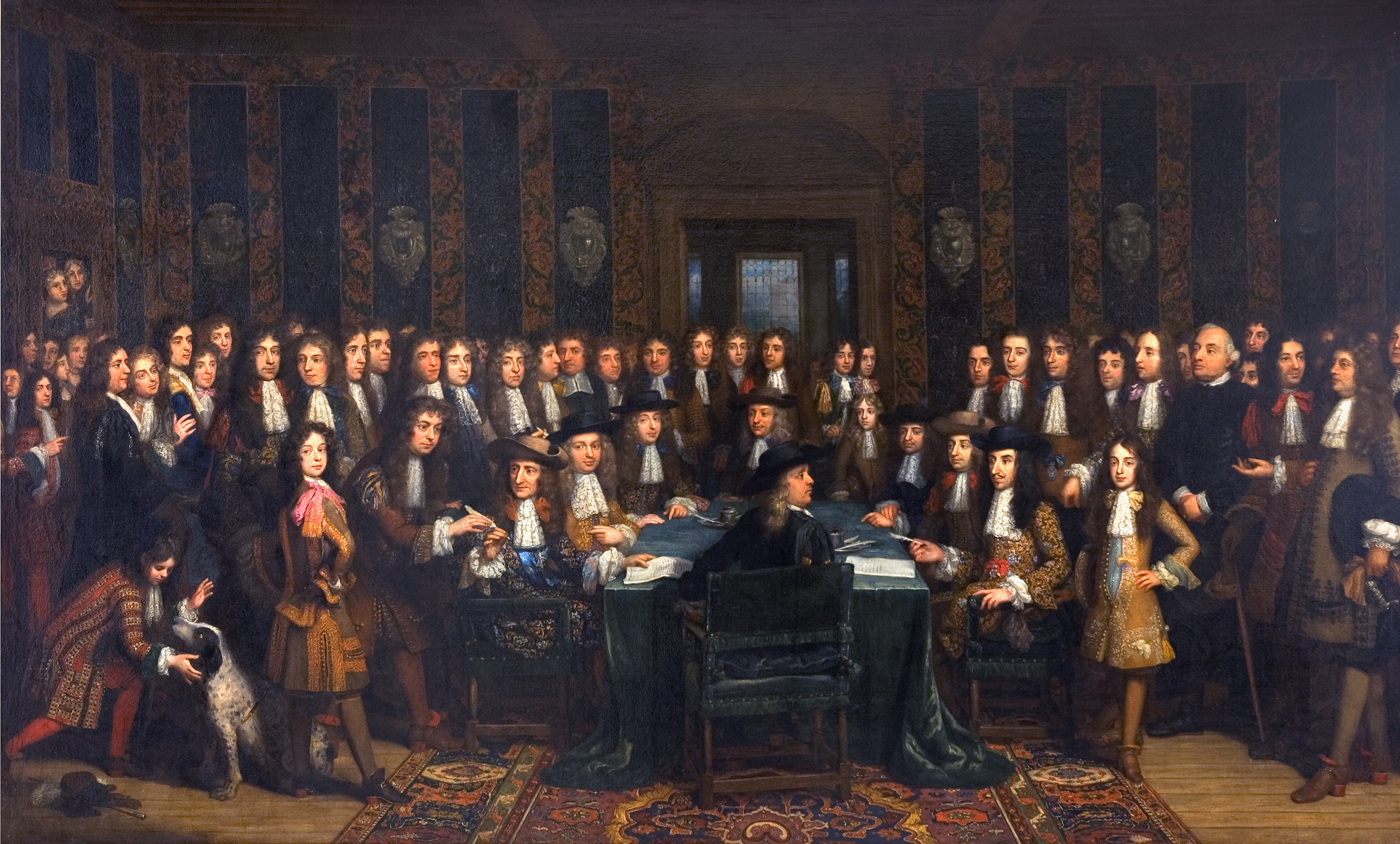
- Dutch and French diplomats signing the peace treaty
- Context: Franco-Dutch War: End of war; France gains control of Franche-Comté, and selected Flanders and Hainaut cities
- Signed: 1678–79
- Location: Nijmegen, Dutch Republic
- Parties: Kingdom of France; Dutch Republic; Habsburg Spain; Brandenburg-Prussia; (Sweden) Swedish Empire; Denmark–Norway; Bishopric of Münster; Lüneburg (Celle); Holy Roman Empire

The Treaties or Peace of Nijmegen (French: Traités de Paix de Nimègue; German: Friede von Nimwegen; Dutch: Vrede van Nijmegen) were a series of treaties signed in the Dutch city of Nijmegen between August 1678 and October 1679. The treaties ended various interconnected wars among France, the Dutch Republic, Spain, Brandenburg, Sweden, Denmark–Norway, the Prince-Bishopric of Münster, and the Holy Roman Empire. The most significant of the treaties was the first, which established peace between France and the Dutch Republic and placed the northern border of France very near its modern position.

== Background ==
The Franco-Dutch War of 1672–78 was the source of all the other wars that were ended formally at Nijmegen. Separate peace treaties were arranged for conflicts like the Third Anglo-Dutch War and the Scanian War, but all of them had been directly caused by and form part of the Franco-Dutch War. England initially participated in the war on the French side but withdrew in 1674, after the Treaty of Westminster, though it switched sides and allied with the Dutch in 1677, its troops returning to the war the next year. The Electorate of Cologne left the war in 1674, while the Prince-Bishopric of Münster switched sides from France to join the anti-French coalition that year. Denmark–Norway also joined the anti-French side in 1675, primarily fighting against Sweden.

At the end of the Franco-Dutch and Scanian Wars, these were the belligerents:

Anti-French coalition

- Dutch Republic
- Spanish Empire (including Spanish Netherlands)
- Denmark–Norway
- England (not included in final settlement)
- Holy Roman Empire:
  - Brandenburg-Prussia
  - Prince-Bishopric of Münster
  - Principality of Lüneburg (Celle)
  - Duchy of Lorraine
  - and others

France and allies

- Kingdom of France
- Kingdom of Sweden

== Treaties ==
Peace negotiations had begun as early as 1676, but nothing was agreed to and signed before 1678. Most treaties were concluded in Nijmegen, therefore the sum of all documents is known as the 'Treaties of Nijmegen'. Some of the countries involved signed peace deals elsewhere, such as the Treaty of Celle (Sweden made peace with Lüneburg (Celle)), Treaty of Saint-Germain (France and Sweden made peace with Brandenburg) and Treaty of Fontainebleau (France dictated peace between Sweden and Denmark–Norway).

Treaties of Nijmegen and related treaties
Date (New Style / (Old Style))	Treaty	Anti-French side	French side	Text	Refs
10 August 1678	Treaty of Nijmegen	Dutch Republic	France	Dutch	
10 August 1678	(separate trade treaty)	Dutch Republic	France		
17 September 1678	Treaty of Nijmegen	Spain	France	French	
5 February 1679	Treaty of Nijmegen	Holy Roman Empire	France and Sweden	Latin/Swedish, German	
5 February 1679 (26 January 1679)	Treaty of Celle	Lüneburg (Celle)	Sweden (and France)		
19 March 1679	Treaty of Nijmegen	Münster	Sweden		
29 June 1679 (19 June 1679)	Treaty of Saint-Germain	Brandenburg-Prussia	France (and Sweden)		
2 September 1679 (23 August 1679)	Treaty of Fontainebleau	Denmark–Norway	Sweden (and France)		
26 September 1679 (16 September 1679)	Peace of Lund	Denmark–Norway	Sweden (and France)		
12 October 1679 (2 October 1679)	Treaty of Nijmegen	Dutch Republic	Sweden		

== Terms ==
Title page of the treaty between Sweden and the Holy Roman Empire.

The Franco–Dutch War ended with a treaty which gave France control over the region of the Franche-Comté. France also gained further territories of the Spanish Netherlands, adding to those it had annexed under the 1659 Treaty of the Pyrenees and 1668 Treaty of Aix-la-Chapelle. These included the town of Saint-Omer with the remaining northwestern part of the former Imperial County of Artois; the lands of Cassel, Aire and Ypres in southwestern Flanders; the Bishopric of Cambrai; and the towns of Valenciennes and Maubeuge in the southern County of Hainaut.

In turn, French King Louis XIV ceded the occupied town of Maastricht and the Principality of Orange to the Dutch stadtholder William III. The French forces withdrew from several occupied territories in northern Flanders and Hainaut.

Emperor Leopold I retained the captured fortress of Philippsburg but had to accept the French occupation of the towns of Freiburg (until 1697) and Kehl (until 1698) on the right bank of the Rhine.

The treaties did not result in a lasting peace.

== Culture ==
Marc-Antoine Charpentier wrote a Te Deum for this occasion. The prelude of the Te Deum is also known as the Eurovision theme.

== See also ==
- Louis XIV Victory Monument
