= Flanders Expedition =

Flanders Expedition may refer to

- Flanders Expedition (1678), an English Army expeditionary force sent to support the Dutch against the French at the tail end of the Franco-Dutch War
- Flanders Expedition (1799), or the Anglo-Russian invasion of Holland (27 August to 19 November 1799) during the War of the Second Coalition
