= Jacques Lenfant =

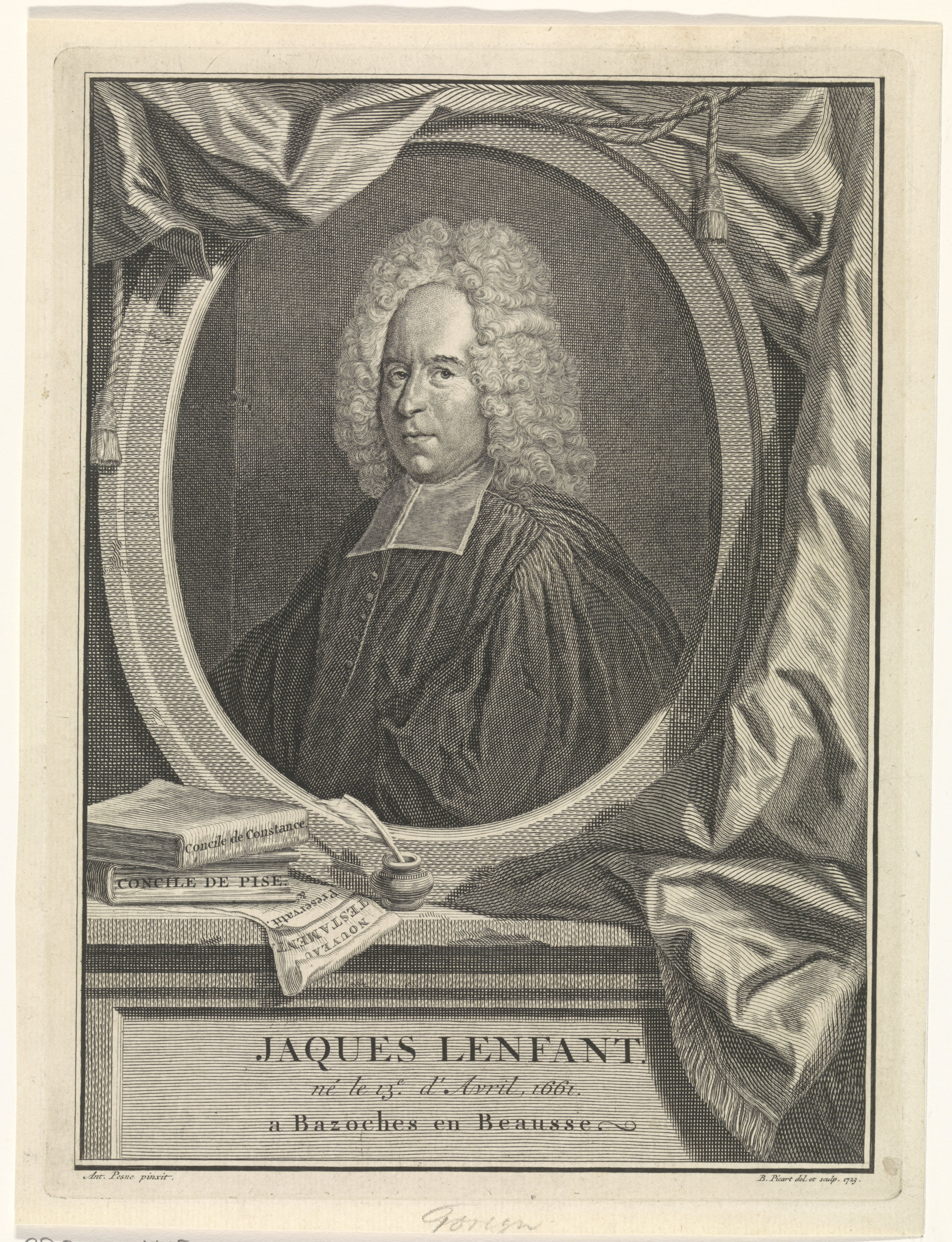
Jacques Lenfant

Jacques Lenfant (13 April 1661, Bazoches-en-Dunois, Beauce - 7 August 1728, Berlin), French Protestant divine, was born at Bazoches-en-Dunois in 1661, son of Paul Lenfant, Protestant pastor at Bazoche and afterwards at Châtillon-sur-Loing until the revocation of the edict of Nantes, when he moved to Marburg in the Landgraviate of Hesse-Kassel.

After studying at Saumur and Geneva, Lenfant completed his theological course at Heidelberg, where in 1684 he was ordained minister of the French Protestant church, and appointed chaplain to the dowager electress palatine. When the French invaded the Electorate of the Palatinate in 1688 Lenfant withdrew to Berlin, as in a recent book he had vigorously attacked the Jesuits. Here in 1689 he was again appointed one of the ministers of the French Protestant church; this office he continued to hold until his death, ultimately adding to it that of chaplain to the king, with the dignity of Consistorialrath. He visited Holland and England in 1707, preached before Queen Anne, and, it is said, was invited to become one of her chaplains. He was the author of many works, chiefly on church history. In search of materials he visited Helmstedt in 1712, and Leipzig in 1715 and 1725. He died at Berlin on 7 August 1728.

An exhaustive catalogue of his publications, thirty-two in all, will be found in J. G. de Chauffepié's Dictionnaire. See also Eugène and Émile Haags' La France Protestante. He is now best known by his Histoire du Concile de Constance (Amsterdam, 1714; 2nd ed., 1728; English trans., 1730). It is of course largely dependent upon the laborious work of Hermann von der Hardt (1660-1746), but has literary merits peculiar to itself, and has been praised on all sides for its fairness. It was followed by Histoire du Concile de Pise (1724), and (posthumously) by Histoire de la guerre des Hussites et du Concile de Basle (Amsterdam, 1731; German translation, Vienna, 1783-1784). Lenfant was one of the chief promoters of the Bibliothèque Germanique, begun in 1720; and he was associated with Isaac de Beausobre (1659-1738) in the preparation of the new French translation of the New Testament with original notes, published at Amsterdam in 1718.
