= Peace of Lund =

1679 peace treaty between Denmark–Norway and the Swedish Empire

Freden i Lund
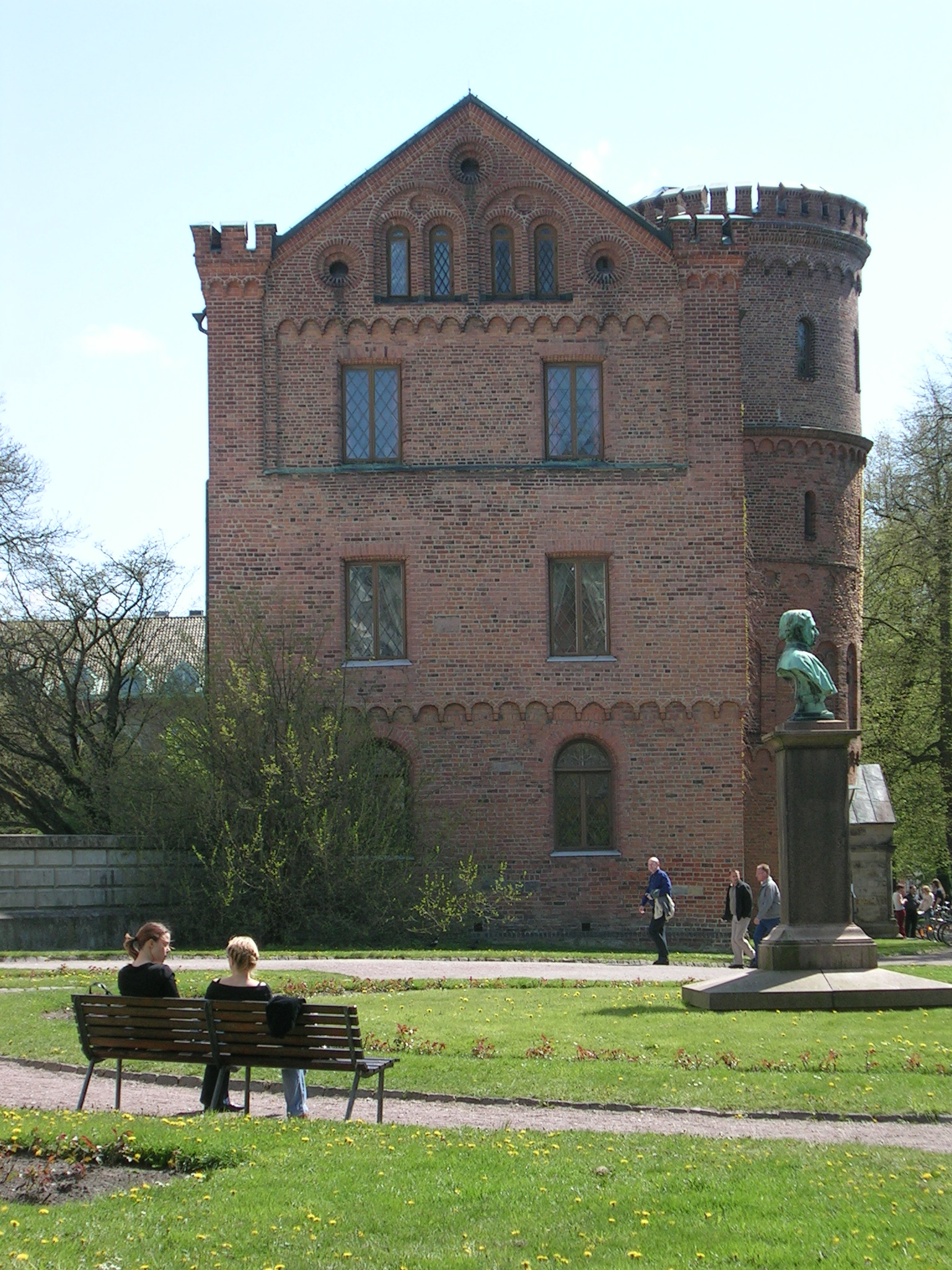
- Kungshuset (Royal castle) in Lund
- Type: Peace treaty; Alliance
- Signed: 26 September 1679
- Location: Lund, Scania
- Signatories: (Swedish Empire) Charles XI of Sweden; (Denmark–Norway) Christian V of Denmark
- Parties: (yes) Swedish Empire; Denmark–Norway
- Language: Latin

The Peace of Lund, signed on 16 September (O.S.) / 26 September 1679, was the final peace treaty between Denmark–Norway and the Swedish Empire in the Scanian War.

The war had started when Sweden on French initiative attacked Brandenburg-Prussia. Denmark got involved as part of the anti-Franco-Swedish alliance, occupied the Swedish dominions in northern Germany, incorporated the Swedish ally Holstein-Gottorp, won naval supremacy in the Baltic Sea and recovered some of her Scandinavian provinces lost in the Treaty of Copenhagen (1660). Since 1678, France divided the anti-Franco-Swedish alliance by concluding separate peace treaties with its members in the Treaties of Nijmegen. Strengthened by the outcome of these treaties, France strove to relieve her Swedish ally. French military pressure first forced Brandenburg-Prussia into the Treaty of Saint-Germain-en-Laye (1679), depriving Denmark of her most important ally.

Just after this had caused Danish and Swedish diplomats to start negotiations in Lund, French forces crossed into Danish territory and forced Denmark to accept the French-dictated Treaty of Fontainebleau (1679), that called for restoring to Sweden all her pre-war possessions and Holstein-Gottorp to its duke. Dano-Swedish negotiations in Lund continued, and the final treaty did not only confirm and detail the terms of Fontainebleau, but also included a secret alliance outlined primarily by Gyllenstierna. The alliance, fragile from the beginning, broke apart in the following year after Gyllenstierna's death.

== Background ==
In 1678/79, Louis XIV of France ended a series of conflicts by the Treaties of Nijmegen, most notably the Franco-Dutch War. These treaties were favourable for France, who continued to maintain and use her 100,000 troops and her status as a great power to expand (pursuing so-called réunions) and intervene in the Scanian War.

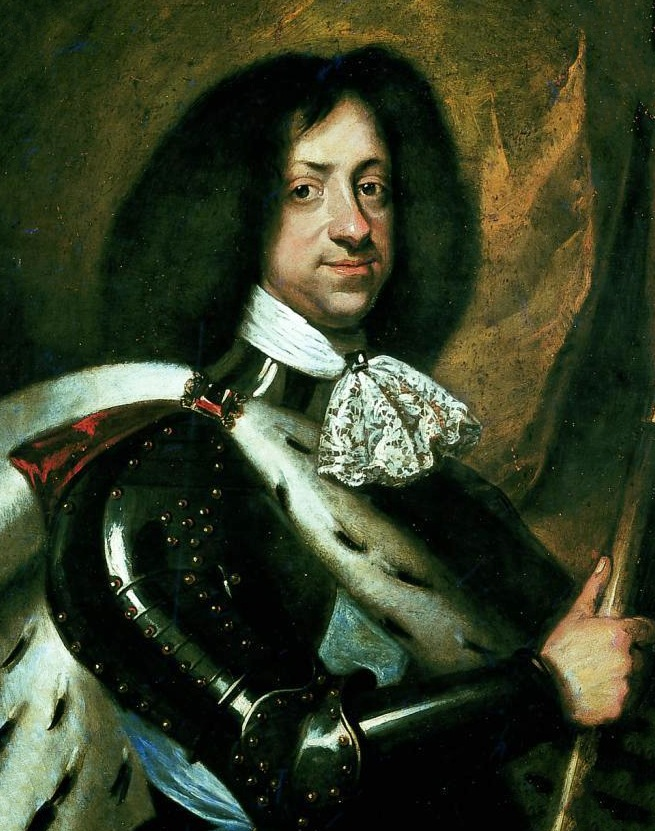
Christian V of Denmark

This war had started when France pressed her Swedish ally to attack her adversary Brandenburg-Prussia in 1674. This move, though performed half-heartedly, succeeded in the withdrawal of the main Brandenburg-Prussian army from the French border in order to confront Sweden. The price paid by Sweden for relieving Brandenburgian pressure on France was a series of lost battles from Fehrbellin to Stralsund, which expelled Sweden from her Pomeranian dominion. Furthermore, the Swedish attack on Brandenburg prompted Denmark–Norway, like Brandenburg-Prussian a member of an anti-French alliance, to enter the war.

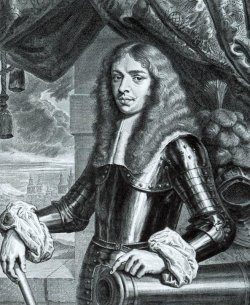
Christian Albrecht of Holstein-Gottorp

Before attacking Sweden directly, Christian V of Denmark expelled the Swedish ally Christian Albrecht (or Albert) from Holstein-Gottorp. Christian Albrecht had allied with Sweden after he was outmaneuvered by Christian V in a conflict over the succession in Oldenburg, which emerged after Anton Günther of Oldenburg's death in 1667. In 1675, Christian V's attack forced Christian Albrecht to unite his duchy with Denmark in the Treaty of Rendsburg and exile to Hamburg.

Later in 1675, the Danish armies sacked Swedish Wismar and Bremen-Verden, participated in the Brandenburg-Prussian campaign in Swedish Pomerania, and started a naval offensive that two years later put an end to Swedish supremacy in the Baltic Sea in the Battle of Køge. Danish recovery of the provinces lost to Sweden in the Second Northern War however proved difficult, and after the Danish invasion in June 1676 and the subsequent setback in Lund, neither Denmark nor Sweden was able to gain the upper hand in the Scanian theater.

== Negotiations, Fontainebleau ==
After Louis XIV had divided the anti-French coalition and settled with most of his adversaries in Nijmegen, his armies crossed the Rhine to relieve his hard-pressed ally Charles XI of Sweden. The invasion of the Brandenburg-Prussian Rhine provinces in May 1679 forced Frederick William I to withdraw from the war and agree to the French-dictated terms of the Treaty of Saint-Germain-en-Laye. Deprived of her allies, Denmark had no choice but to settle for peace.

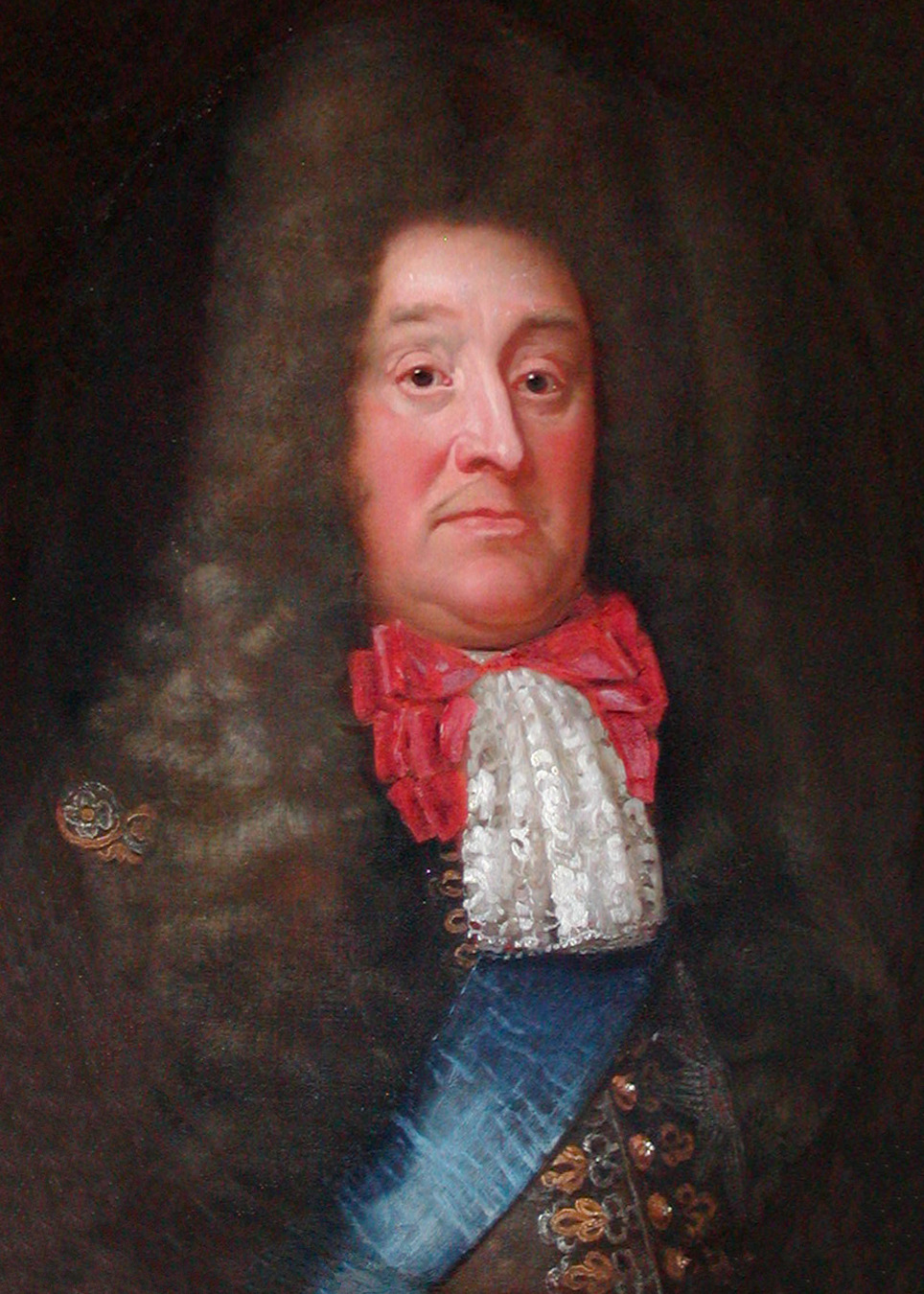
Jens Juel

Negotiations started in June 1679 in the Scanian town of Lund. The Danish plenipotentiaries were Anton of Aldenburg and Jens Juel, while Johan Göransson Gyllenstierna and Frans Joel Örnstedt negotiated for Sweden. Yet, at about the same time the negotiations started, the French army had crossed into the Danish duchies and marched on Danish Oldenburg.

French pressure left Denmark no choice but to return to the status quo ante bellum in the Treaty of Fontainebleau on 23 August (O.S.) / 2 September 1679, which restored all conquests made during the war to Sweden in turn for a "paltry indemnity".

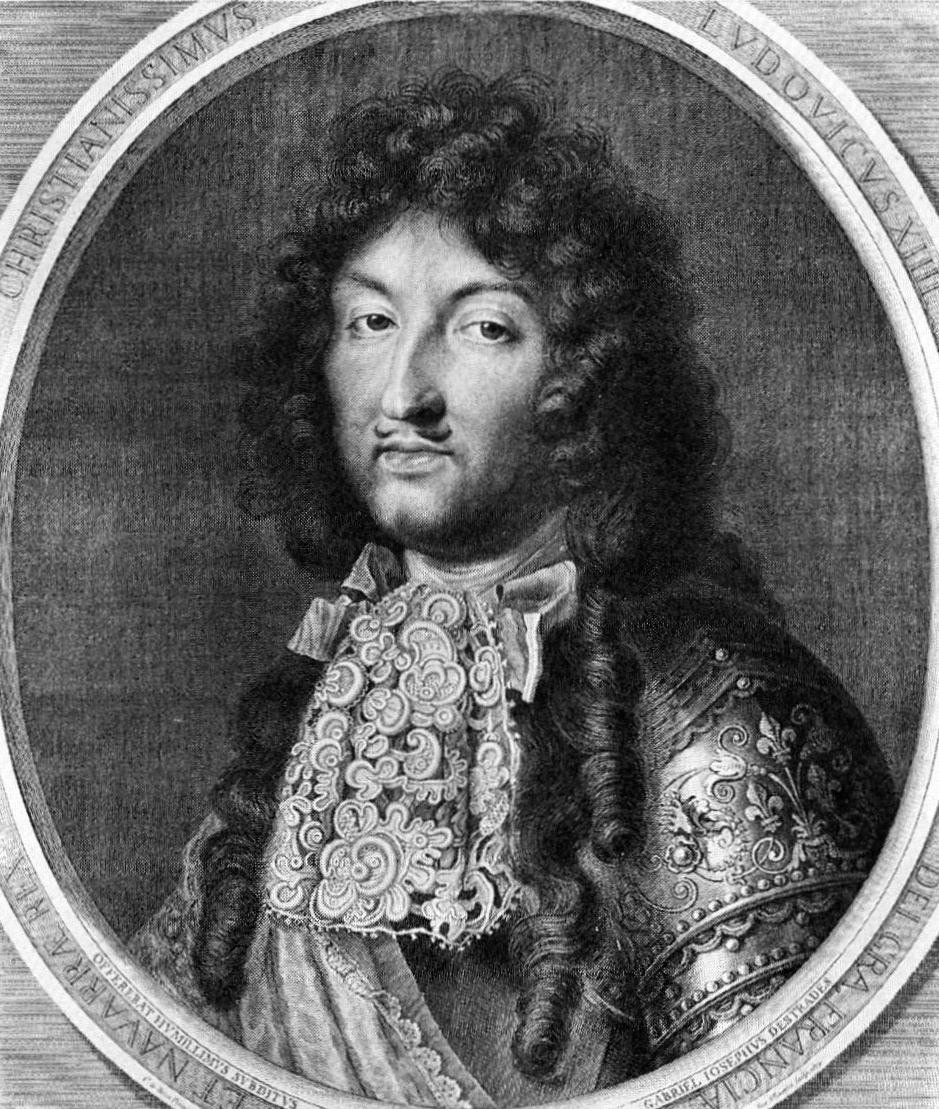
Le Roi Soleil, Louis XIV

The treaty, concluded by Danish, French and Swedish envoys in Louis XIV's palace of Fontainebleau just south of Paris, was written in French and Latin. The plenipotentiaries' leeway was limited, as Louis XIV had decreed in August that the settlement was to be a "total restitution" of pre-war Swedish territory to his ally, "the preservation of [whose] interests is no less dear to me than of my own". Rying (1981) summarized the treaty as follows:

"Denmark would come empty-handed out of a war with France as an enemy. Ten cannons as trophies from each of the captured fortresses were all that Denmark got out of this war, that was [...] lost at Fontainebleau."

The validity of the treaties of Westphalia (1648), Roskilde (1658) and Copenhagen (1660) was confirmed, and Christian Albrecht restored in Holstein-Gottorp.

== Lund ==
The final settlement at Lund, signed on 16 September (O.S.) / 26 September 1679, detailed and amended Fontainebleau. French pressure assured that the terms of Fontainebleau were confirmed, as was Sweden's exemption from the Sound Dues.

Besides areas in Skåneland, the Danish-occupied territories which were to be returned also included the Swedish port of Wismar in Mecklenburg and northern Swedish Pomerania with the isle of Rügen. Rügen was to be returned on 20 October 1679 (Article VI), while Wismar was to be returned only after Denmark had received the agreed-on contributions (Article VII).

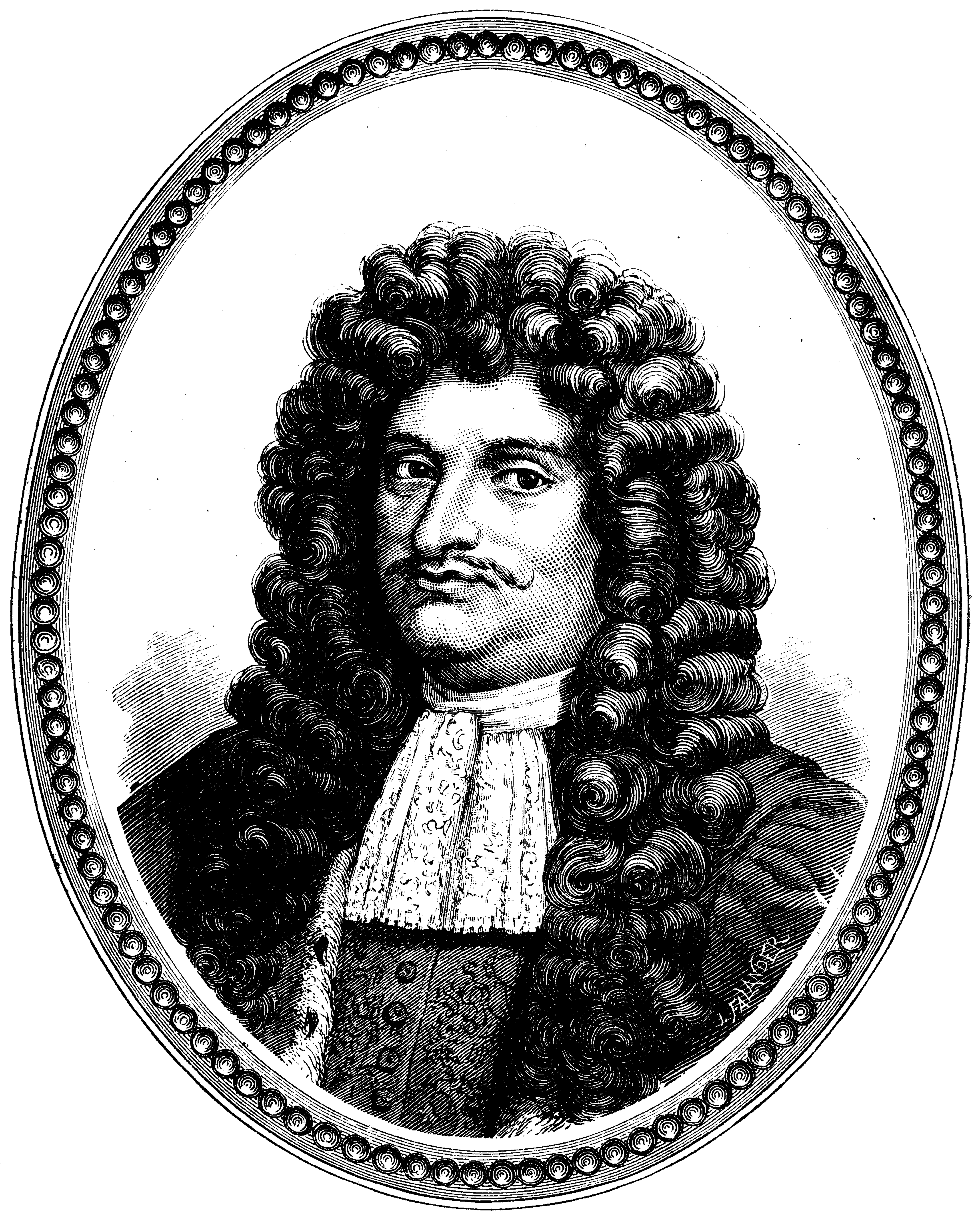
Johan Göransson Gyllenstierna

In addition to these openly proclaimed articles, the treaty included secret paragraphs negotiated by Johan Göransson Gyllenstierna. They outlined a strategy of mutual assistance, which Gyllenstierna understood was the only way the Scandinavian countries were able to compete with France and Brandenburg-Prussia. The alliance was to last ten years.

Gyllenstierna had come to power during the war, and by 1679 controlled Sweden's foreign policy to a point that he was given "free hand" by Charles XI in negotiating the treaty. His goal was to free the resources bound by the continuous Dano-Swedish hostilities, assert common control of the Baltic Sea, advance to a more favourable commercial position with respect to the Dutch Republic, and be able to negotiate better terms with France with respect to military alliances. Yet, as Charles XI and other leading Swedish figures, he was also hostile towards Denmark–Norway, and had proposed to eliminate Denmark–Norway in a joint Franco-Swedish attack just prior to the negotiations. While his motives remain speculative, the secret alliance as laid out in the treaty included several co-operations in northern Germany, joint negotiations with France, and a joint position regarding the Baltic Sea trade.

A defensive alliance was also concluded, but included in the public part of the treaty. The secret articles of Lund were revealed only in 1870.

== Consequences ==
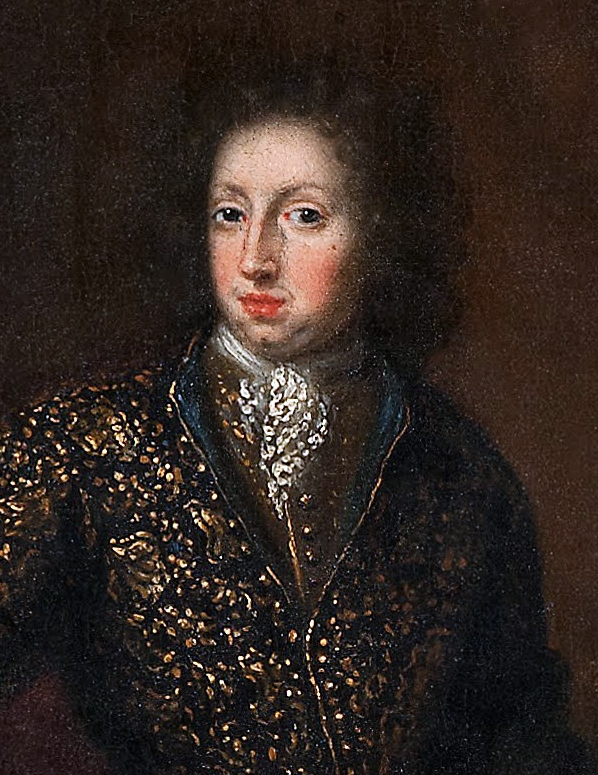
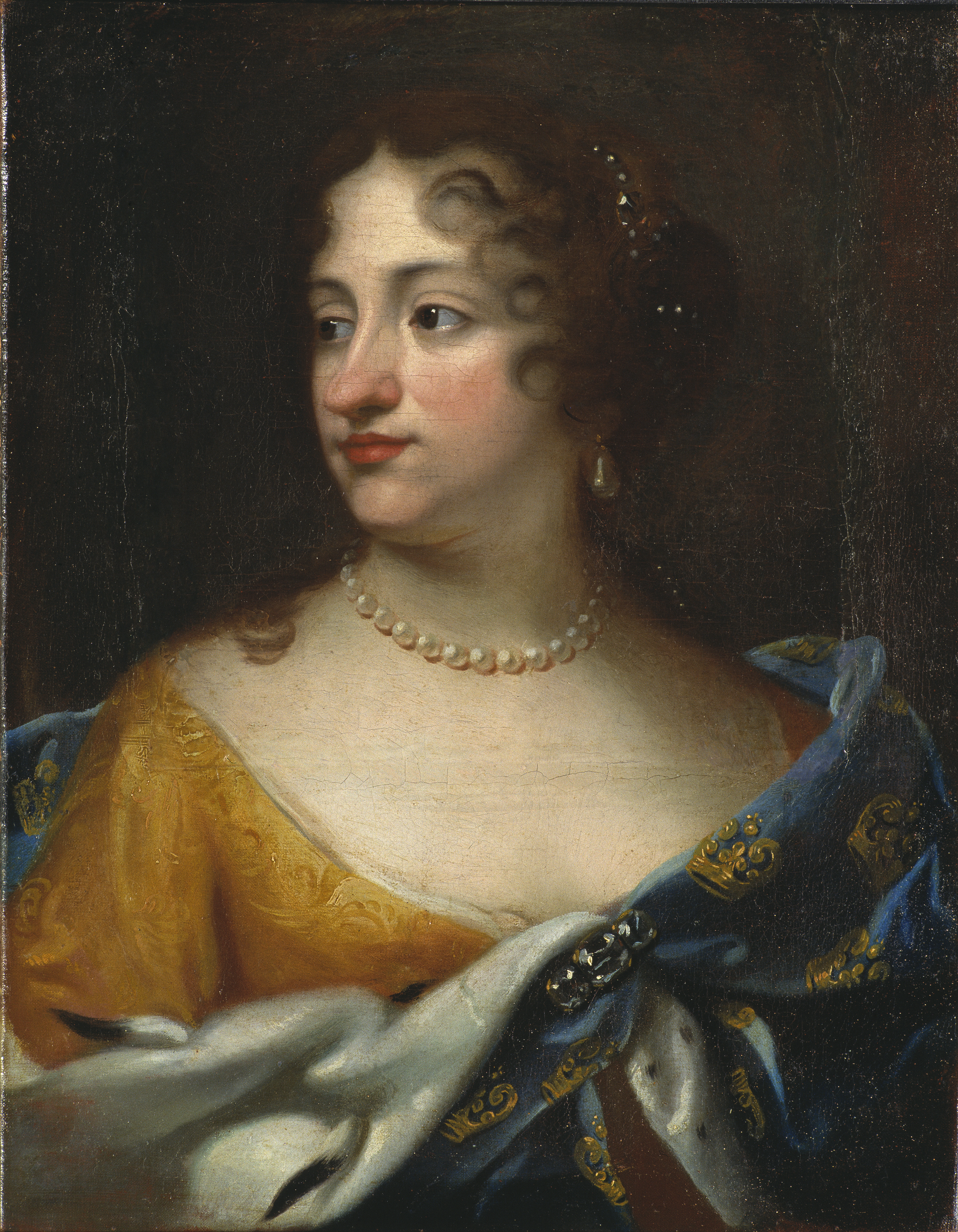
Charles XI of Sweden and Ulrika Eleonora of Denmark

While Charles XI of Sweden married Ulrika Eleonora of Denmark and the conciliatory Gyllenstierna became governor of contested Scania in 1679, his death in 1680 left Bengt Oxenstierna in charge of Sweden's foreign relations. Oxenstierna reversed Gyllenstierna's policies, instead he started bending the terms of Lund already in his first year in office by ratifying a Dutch-Swedish treaty without consulting Denmark, and thereafter allied with various European powers to force Denmark–Norway out of Schleswig in 1689.

The early 1690s saw a short period of Dano-Swedish rapprochement, when the alliance of Lund was renewed and extended in 1690 and 1693 for fear of the Maritime Powers, resulting in the Scandinavian states' first armed neutrality. Yet in 1700, the countries were at war again.

== Sources ==
=== Bibliography ===
- Asmus, Ivo (2003). "Das Testament des Grafen. Die pommerschen Besitzungen Carl Gustav Wrangels nach Tod, förmyndarräfst und Reduktion". In Asmus, Ivo; Droste, Heiko; Olesen, Jens E. (eds.). Gemeinsame Bekannte: Schweden und Deutschland in der Frühen Neuzeit (in German). Berlin-Hamburg-Münster: LIT Verlag. ISBN 3-8258-7150-9.
- Goubert, Pierre (1991). The course of French history. Routledge. ISBN 0-415-06671-9.
- Hille, Georg: Christian Albrecht, in Historische Kommission bei der Bayerischen Akademie der Wissenschaften (eds): Allgemeine Deutsche Biographie, Volume 4, 1876, pp. 188–191, as cited in wikisource, URL: http://de.wikisource.org/w/index.php?title=ADB:Christian_Albrecht&oldid=972420, retrieved 23 February 2010, 12:09 UTC.
- Holborn, Hajo (1982). A History of Modern Germany: 1648-1840. Princeton University Press. ISBN 0-691-00796-9.
- Lange, Ulrich (1996). Geschichte Schleswig-Holsteins. Von den Anfängen bis zur Gegenwart (in German) (2 ed.). Wachholtz. ISBN 3-529-02440-6.
- Nolan, Cathal J. (2008). Wars of the age of Louis XIV, 1650-1715. An encyclopedia of global warfare and civilization. Greenwood encyclopedias of modern world wars. ABC-CLIO. ISBN 978-0-313-33046-9.
- Orfield, Lester Bernhardt. The Growth of Scandinavian Law. Philadelphia: University of Pennsylvania Press for Temple University Publications, 1953. Reprinted 2002 by The Lawbook Exchange, Ltd. LCCN 2001023454. ISBN 1-58477-180-1
- Rémy-Limousin, Madeleine (1997). Traités internationaux de l'Ancien Régime. Èditions isolées et recueils conservés à la Bibliothèque nationale de France. Catalogue (in French). Bibliothèque nationale de France. ISBN 2-7177-2008-1.
- Rystad, Göran (2001). Karl XI. En biografi (in Swedish). Historiska Media. ISBN 91-89442-27-X.
- Rying, Bent (1981). Danish in the South and the North. Denmark, history. Vol. 2. Udenrigsministeriet (Royal Danish Ministry of Foreign Affairs).
- Scott, Franklin Daniel (1988). Sweden, the nation's history. SIU Press. ISBN 0-8093-1489-4.
- Treasure, Geoffrey (1985). The making of modern Europe, 1648-1780. Taylor & Francis. ISBN 0-416-72370-5.
- Upton, Anthony F (1998). Charles XI and Swedish absolutism. Cambridge studies in early modern history. Cambridge University Press. ISBN 0-521-57390-4.
