= Maria Muschbukta =

Bay on the Norwegian island of Jan Mayen

Coordinates: 70°59.7′N 8°31.1′W

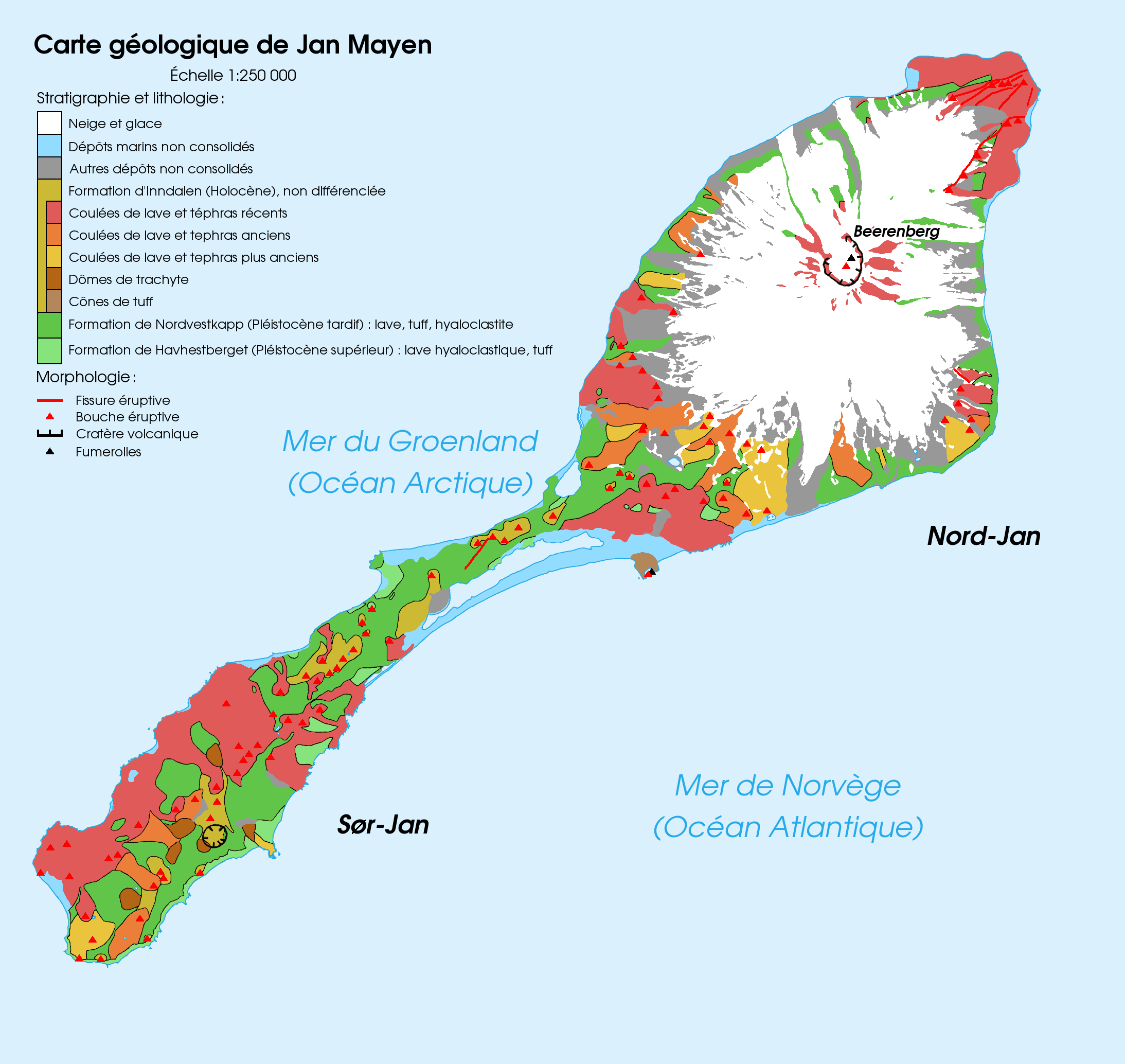
Map of Jan Mayen

Maria Muschbukta (English: Maria Musch Bay) is an open bay between Fulgeberget and Kvalrossen, on the western coast of the Norwegian island of Jan Mayen. It is named after the shipowner Maria Musch. She was a member of the Kleine Noordse Compagnie, which sent a ship to Jan Mayen in 1616 as part of early Dutch whaling. This ship was the first to use the bay to hunt whales. The name is shown on Joan Blaeu's 1662 map of the island.
