= Maria Musch =

Dutch shipowner

Maria Musch (died 21 April 1635), was a Dutch shipowner. She was a major partner of the pioneer whaling company Kleine Noordse Compagnie (1616), which initiated the whaling industry around Jan Mayen. The bay Maria Muschbukta was named after her.

She was born to Cornelis Cornelisz. Matelief and Aefje Claesdr. van der Horst and married in 1591 to Jan Musch (d. 1610), merchant and mayor of Rotterdam. When she was widowed in 1610, she took over the trade company of fish and salt after her late spouse to support herself and seven children, and became successful within business. She was the paternal grandmother of Elisabeth Musch.

== See also ==
- Noordsche Compagnie
