= Ignaz Agricola =

German Jesuit

Ignaz Agricola (July 31, 1661 – January 23, 1729) was a German Jesuit.

Agricola was born in Zusamaltheim in the Bishopric of Augsburg. He entered the Jesuit order on September 28, 1677, and studied in Jesuit schools, philosophy for three years and theology for four years. He then taught in Jesuit schools for a number of years: grammar for two years, poetry for two years, rhetoric for seven years, and logic for two years. He spent much of this time in Munich, where in 1719 he was president of the Sodalitas major, and where he died in 1729.

His wrote a well-known history of the Jesuit order, Historia Provinciae Societatis Jesu Germaniae superioris, quinque primas annorum complexa decades (1727).
