= Jan van Buken =

Belgian painter

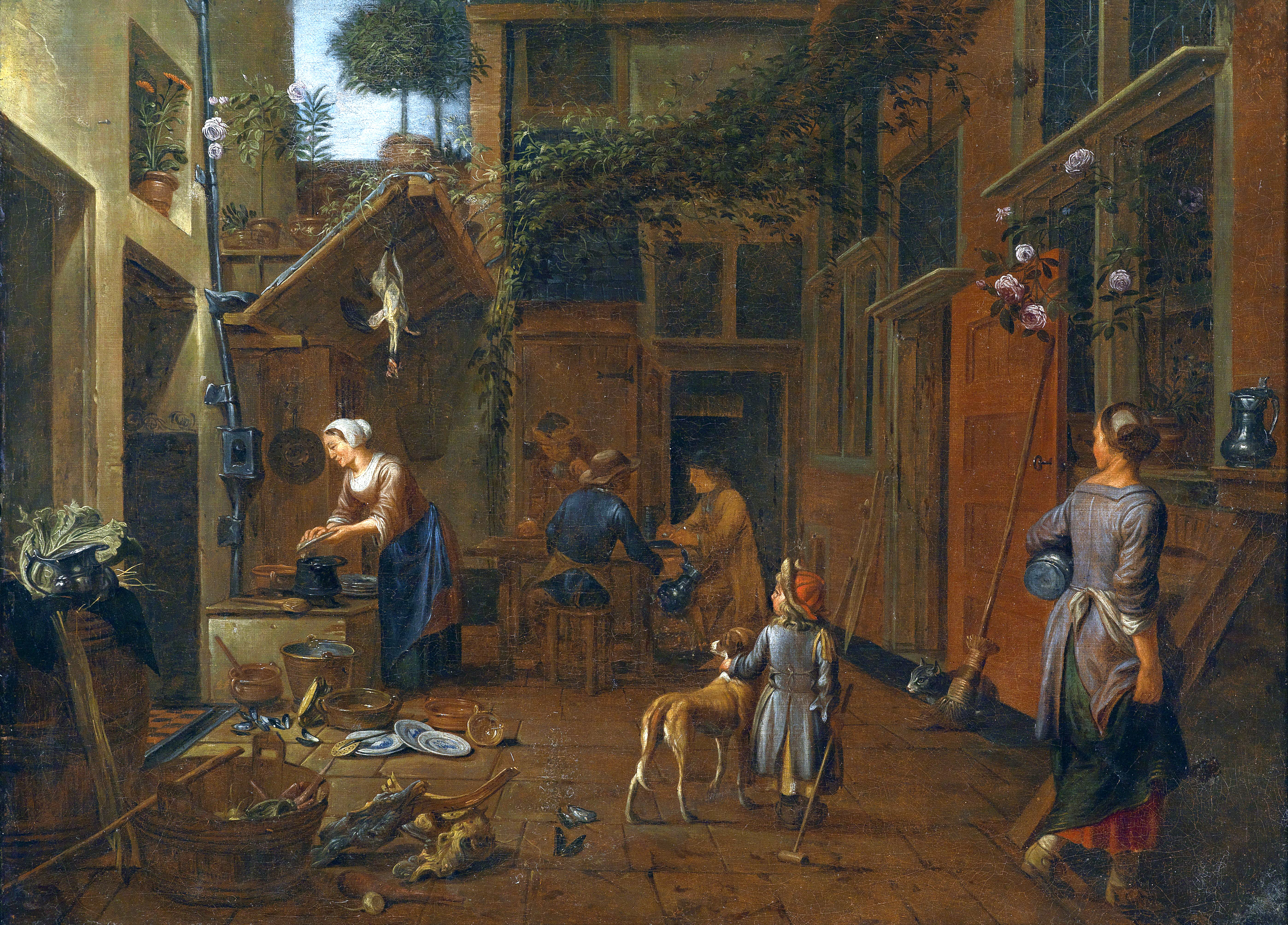
Courtyard with kitchen

Jan van Buken or Jan van Beucken (10 March 1635 – 6 February 1694) was a Flemish painter mainly known for his genre paintings and still lifes.

== Life ==
Jan van Buken was born in Antwerp. He became a master in the Guild of Saint Luke in 1658 where he was registered under the name 'Jan van Beucken'. In the period from 1666 to 1682 he worked in Rome while regularly travelling back to Antwerp. He returned to live in Antwerp after the death of his parents.

Jan Baptist Beveren was registered as his pupil in 1689–90.

Jan van Buken died in Antwerp in 1694.

== Work ==
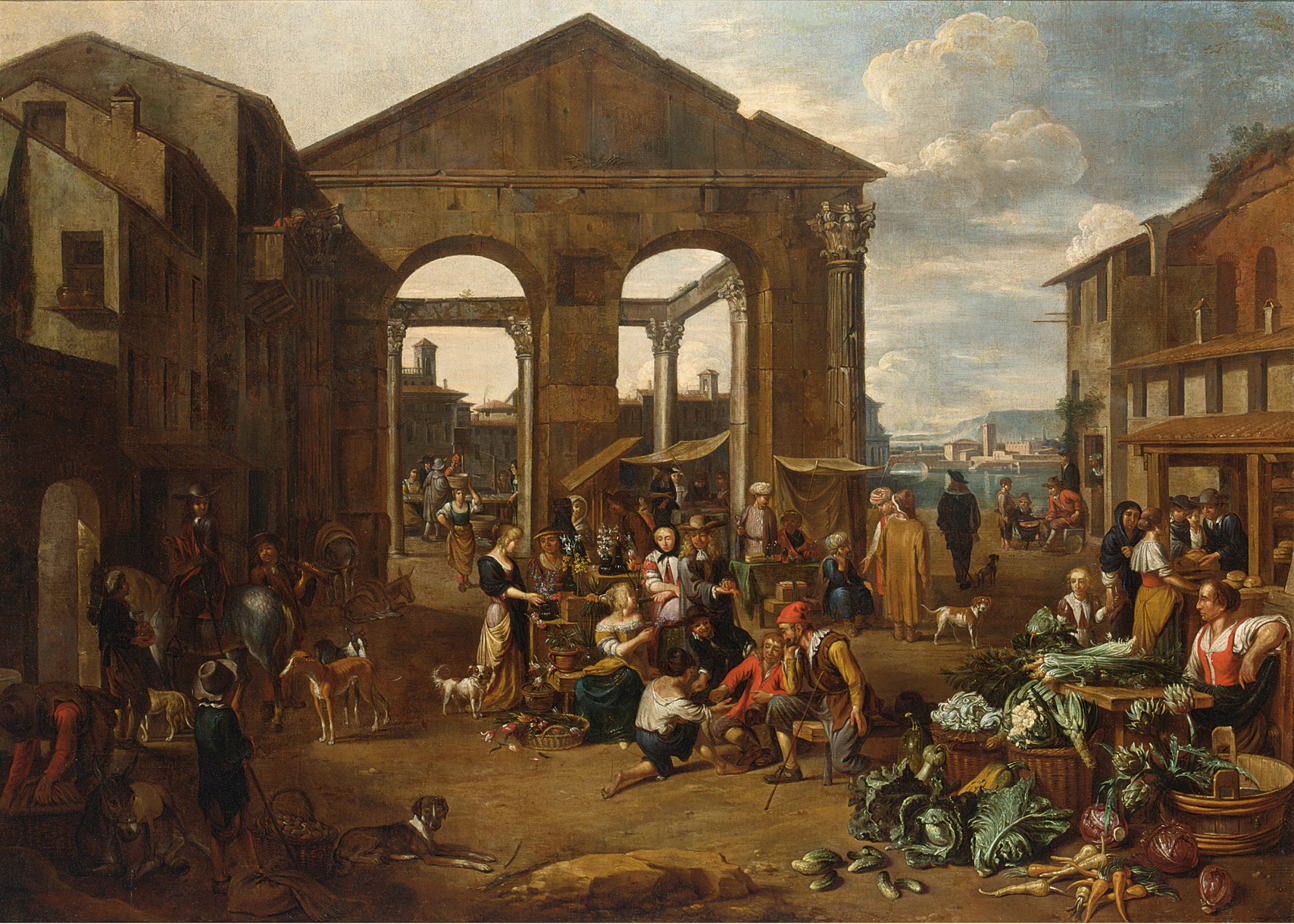
Italianate Market Scene

He painted mainly genre scenes and still lifes. The genre scenes cover the whole range of farm, kitchen and market scenes often including still lifes of food, game and fruit. He also painted still lifes of game, fish, food and flowers.

Van Buken's paintings are in many ways close to those of the "Bamboccianti" painters. The name Bamboccianti is given to a loose group of principally Dutch and Flemish genre painters who were active in Rome from about 1625 until the end of the seventeenth century and took as the subject of their paintings the everyday life of the lower classes in Rome and its countryside. An example of a composition in Bambocianti style is "An Italianate Market Scene with Remnants of a Roman Temple with a Harbour Beyond" (Sotheby's, 27 March 2007, London, lot 15). It depicts a 'low-life' scene of a vegetable market in an Italianate harbour town with Roman ruins. The composition includes other typical Bamboccianti elements such as the morra players in the middle of the market. The scene includes some high-ranking individuals such as the gentleman on a horse apparently returning from the hunt with a servant carrying his gun. He turns his head to look in amusement at the market scene just like van Buken's patrons would have done when confronted with a similar scene in real life. Typical for van Buken is the inclusion of a still life of vegetables in the foreground of this composition.

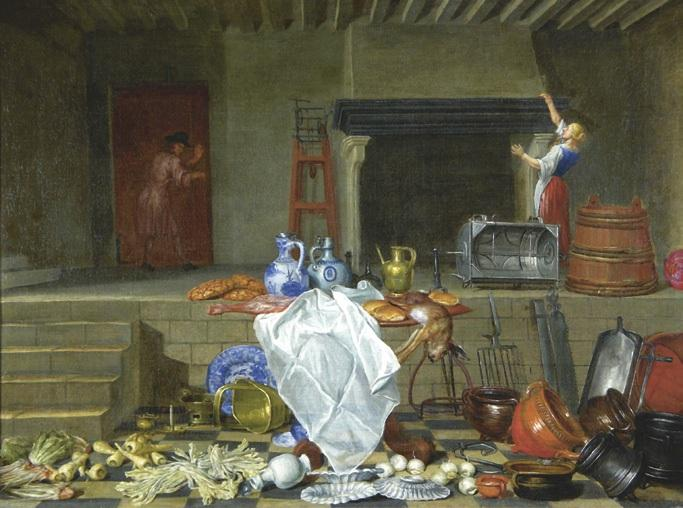
Kitchen still life

Van Buken's market scenes with abundant still life elements are also reminiscent of the work of Antwerp painters such as Erasmus de Bie, Peeter van Bredael and Peeter Gijsels whose works are similarly themed.

About 25 works are currently attributed to Jan van Buken. Only two are known to be in museum collections: one is A still life of vegetables, poultry and meat in the collection of the Staatliches Museum Schwerin while a Market Scene is in the collection of the Nationalmuseum in Stockholm.

A Kitchen still life in a private collection in Hungary illustrates some of the compositional qualities of the artist. The painting shows a kitchen scene with a still life of game, food and kitchen utensils in the foreground and a large fireplace and two persons - apparently a female and male servant - at the back of the scene. The man is exiting through a door at the left while the woman has her hand on top of the ledge above the fireplace, possibly cleaning it. The still life's apparent disorder hides a compositional scheme based on triangles.
