= Treaty of Fontainebleau (1679) =

1679 peace treaty between Denmark-Norway and the Swedish Empire

Treaty of Fontainebleau, original document.

The Treaty of Fontainebleau, signed on 23 August (O.S.) / 2 September 1679, ended hostilities between Denmark-Norway and the Swedish Empire in the Scanian War. Denmark, pressured by France, restored all conquests made during the war to Sweden in turn for a "paltry indemnity". The treaty was confirmed, detailed and amended in the subsequent Peace of Lund.

== See also ==
- Louis XIV Victory Monument
