= Flanders Expedition (1678) =

English expeditionary force

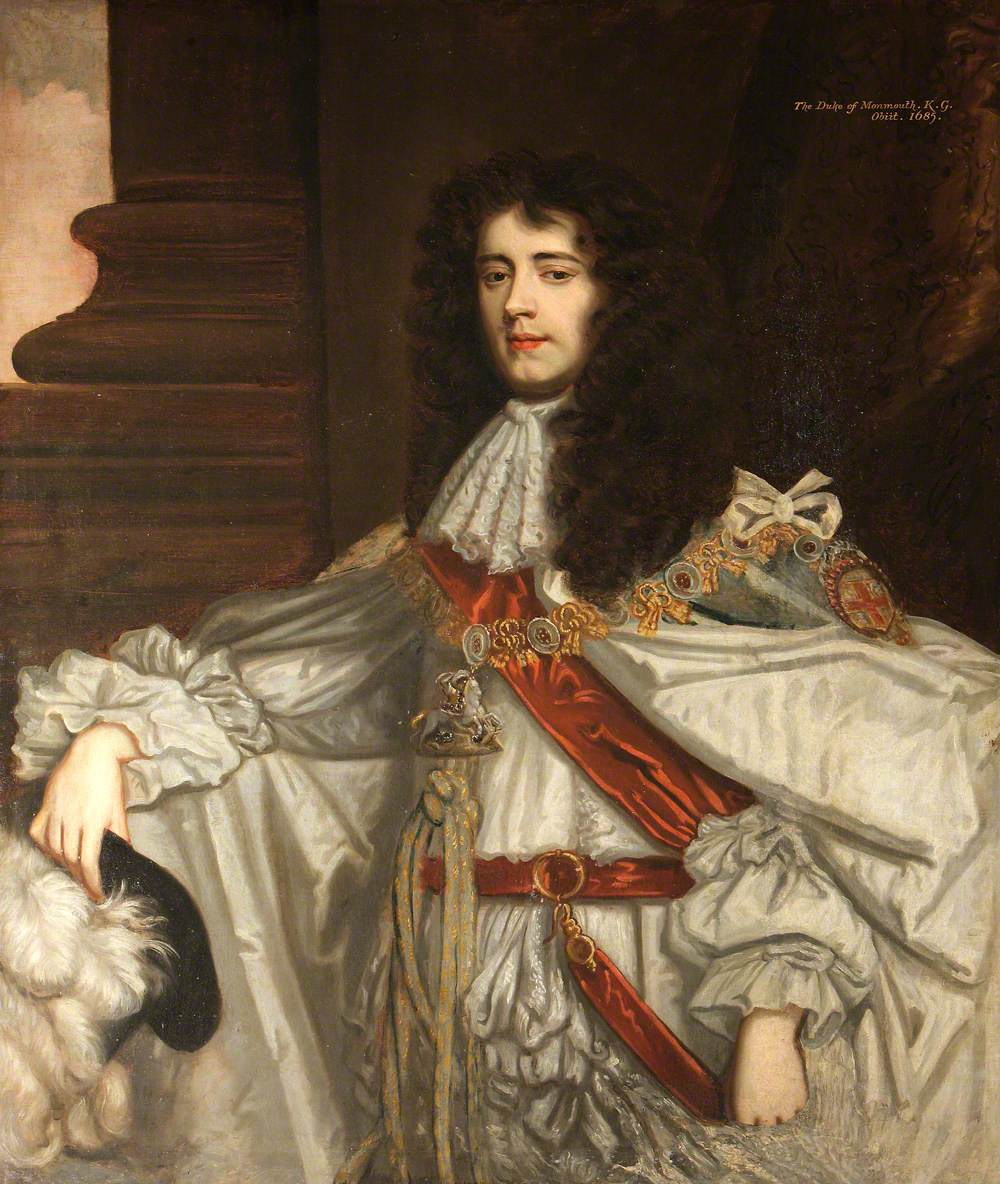
The Duke of Monmouth, who commanded the expedition

The Flanders Expedition was an expeditionary force of the English Army sent to Flanders in 1678 to support the Dutch and Spanish armies against the French as part of the Franco-Dutch War. The expedition was led by James Scott, Duke of Monmouth and was supposed to support Monmouth's cousin William of Orange and his English wife Mary in their war against France. Some of the English units fought at the Battle of Saint-Denis, the last battle of the war. The war ended with the Treaty of Nijmegen shortly later, and the expeditionary army had to return to England.

After the marriage of Mary, the daughter of the James, Duke of York, to William of Orange, the English sent an expeditionary force (with its own services and supply chain) to Flanders in 1678 to join the Dutch against the French in the Franco-Dutch War. The expeditionary force was commanded by Monmouth. The English force saw little action but some English units saw action at the Battle of Saint-Denis (the last battle of the war).

At Saint-Denis, a Scottish regiment under the command of Lieutenant-Colonel Douglas attacked the French camp and the Anglo-Dutch Brigade fought in the vanguard of the Dutch-Spanish army, suffering many casualties. Shortly after this battle the Treaty of Nijmegen was signed by the Dutch and France on 10 August 1678 and the campaign came to an end.
