= Johan Göransson Gyllenstierna =

Swedish politician (1635–1680)

Count Johan Gyllenstierna
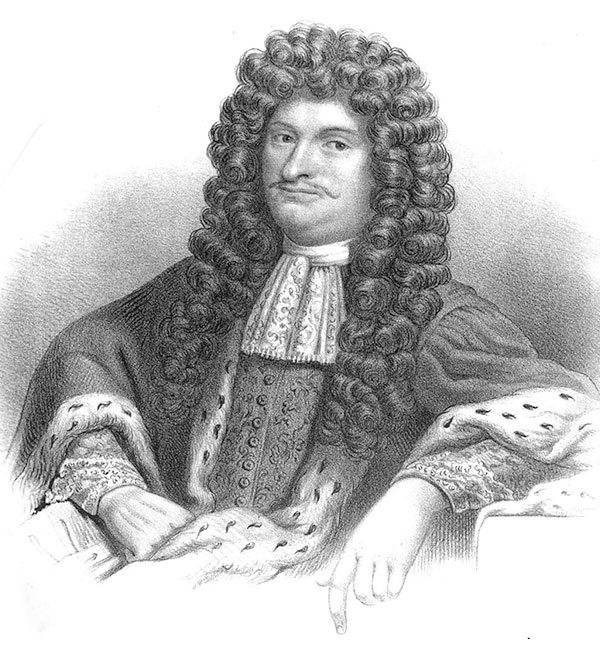
- 1849 portrait of Gyllenstierna

Governor-General of Scania
- In office 1680 – 10 June 1680
- Monarch: Charles XI

Privy Councillor
- In office 1668 – 10 June 1680
- Monarch: Charles XI

Personal details
- Born: 18 February 1635 Brännkyrka, Sweden
- Died: 10 June 1680 (aged 45) Landskrona, Sweden
- Education: Uppsala University
- Occupation: Statesman, diplomat

Johan Göransson Gyllenstierna (18 February 1635 – 10 June 1680) was a Swedish statesman, Privy Councillor, and Governor-General of Scania who served as the principal advisor to King Charles XI of Sweden. A dominant political figure during the late 17th century, he played a crucial role in centralizing royal power against the high aristocracy, reforming state finances, and negotiating the Peace of Lund in 1679.

== Biography ==
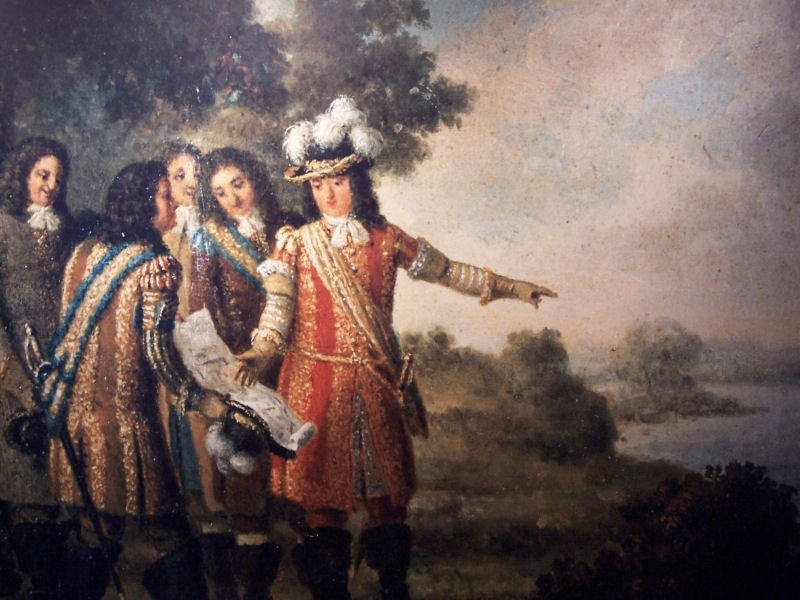
This painting illustrates King Charles XI together with his advisors, whereof Johan Göransson Gyllenstierna.

He completed his studies at Uppsala University and then visited most of the European states, which laid the foundation for his deep insight into international politics which afterwards distinguished him. On his return home he met King Charles X in the Danish islands and was in close attendance upon him until the monarch's death in 1660.

He began his political career at the diet which assembled in the autumn of the same year. An aristocrat by birth, he nevertheless belonged to a family which had not benefitted from the lavishness of recent regimes. Both personal interest and patriotism thus contributed to his zeal for the recovery of the crown lands and for strengthening the crown against the aristocratic families.

During Charles XI's minority, an opposition group in the regency and in the council had Gyllenstierna elected president of the Riksdag of 1668 and later appointed councillor of state. In the Upper House he was the spokesman of the gentry against the magnates, whose inordinate privileges he sought to curtail or abolish. His adversaries vainly endeavoured to gain his favour, for as court-marshal and senator he was still more hostile to the dominant patricians who followed the adventurous policy of Magnus Gabriel De la Gardie. Thus he opposed the French alliance which de la Gardie carried through in 1672 and consistently advocated economy in domestic and neutrality in foreign affairs. A Freiherr, he became a count in 1674.

On the outbreak of the Scanian War in 1675 he was the most loyal supporter of the young king Charles XI and eventually became his indispensable counsellor. The political principles which he instilled into the youthful monarch were faithfully followed by Charles during the whole of his reign.

In 1679 Gyllenstierna was appointed the Swedish plenipotentiary at the peace congress of Lund. The alliance which he then concluded with Denmark bound the two northern realms together in a common foreign policy, and he sought to facilitate their harmonious co-operation by every means possible. In 1680, after bringing home Charles XI's Danish bride from Copenhagen, he was appointed governor-general of Scania (Skåne), but died a few weeks later.
