= Jacques Bruyas =

Jacques Bruyas (13 July 1635 – 15 June 1712) was born in Lyon, France and entered the Jesuits as a novice in 1651.

Bruyas came to the Canadian mission in 1666, arriving at Quebec from where he was soon reassigned by Bishop Laval to the newly re-opened Haudenosaunee missions. He proceeded to the Oneidas in present-day upstate New York. For most of the time, he had serious problems with the Haudenosaunee and his own health and safety.

In 1670, Bruyas moved to the Mohawks and also became the superior of the Haudenosaunee missions. He ministered there with many of the same problems until 1679 when he was transferred to Caughnawaga near Montreal. By 1691, his understanding of the Mohawks had been recognized by Governor Frontenac and from 1693 to 1698, he held the position of the superior of the Canadian mission.

From his years of experience with the Haudenosaunee, he became a skilled negotiator and also contributed extensively to the written Mohawk language producing a grammar, a catechism and a prayer-book in Mohawk. He remained at the Caughnawaga mission until his death.
