= Rokeby baronets =

Extinct baronetcy in the Baronetage of England

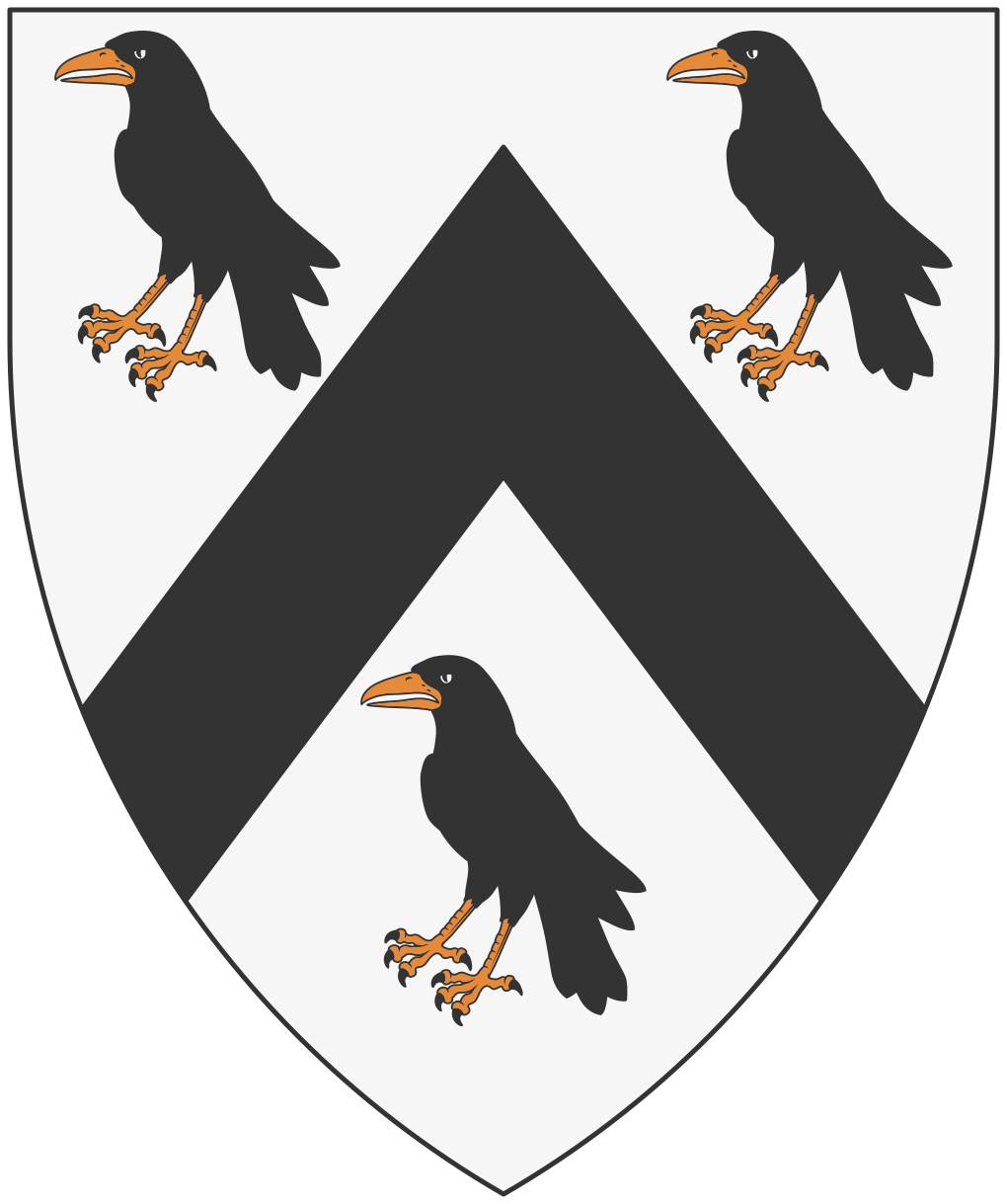
Arms of Rokeby of Skiers

The Rokeby Baronetcy, of Skiers in the County of York, was a title in the Baronetage of England. It was created on 29 January 1661 for William Rokeby. The title became extinct on the death of the third Baronet in 1678.

== Rokeby baronets, of Skiers (1661) ==
- Sir William Rokeby, 1st Baronet (c. 1601 – c. 1676)
- Sir William Rokeby, 2nd Baronet (c. 1656 – 1678)
- Sir Willoughby Rokeby, 3rd Baronet (c. 1632 – 1678)
