= Justus Danckerts =

Dutch artist

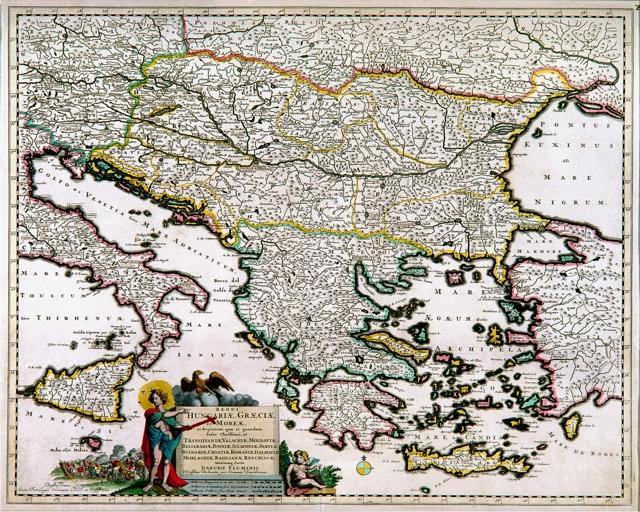
The main Danube Principalities: Bulgaria, Greece, Anatolia, and Italy, map now at the Romanian National Museum of Maps and Old Books.

Justus Danckerts I (11 November 1635 in Amsterdam – 16 July 1701 in Amsterdam) was a Dutch engraver and print publisher who along with other members of the Danckerts family created one of the leading Dutch geographical map and atlas publishing houses.

== Biography ==
Justus Danckerts was the son of Cornelis Danckerts I (1603–1656), who established the Danckerts cartographic family business in Amsterdam. After producing in the early 1680s over 20 folio-sized atlas maps, he published in 1686–1887 the first Danckerts atlas. In 1690, another 26-sheet geographical atlas was published; between 1698 and 1700, a 60-sheet atlas was completed. Its map sheets and plates were used by various publishers until the middle of the 18th century.

== Family ==
His sons, Theodorus Danckerts I (1663–1727) and Cornelis Danckerts II (1664–1717) were prominent engravers and print makers, skillful in map plate engraving and etching.

== Plates ==
- William III., Prince of Orange; afterwards King of England.
- Casimir, King of Poland.
- Seven plates of the Gates of Amsterdam.

== Works ==
- Nova totus terrarum orbis tabula ex officina Iusti Danckerts, Amsterdam. 1680.
- Accuratissima Regnorum Sueciae, Daniae et Norvegiae Tabula. Danckerts, Amsterdam ca. 1700. digital
- Accuratissima Totius Regni Hispaniae Tabula. Danckerts, Amsterdam ca. 1700. digital
- Novissima et accuratissima XVII provinciarum Germaniæ inferioris tabula. Danckerts, Amsterdam ca. 1700. digital
- Novissima Regnorum Portugalliae et Algarbia Descriptio. Danckerts, Amsterdam ca. 1700. digital
