= Bazoches-en-Dunois =

- Commune
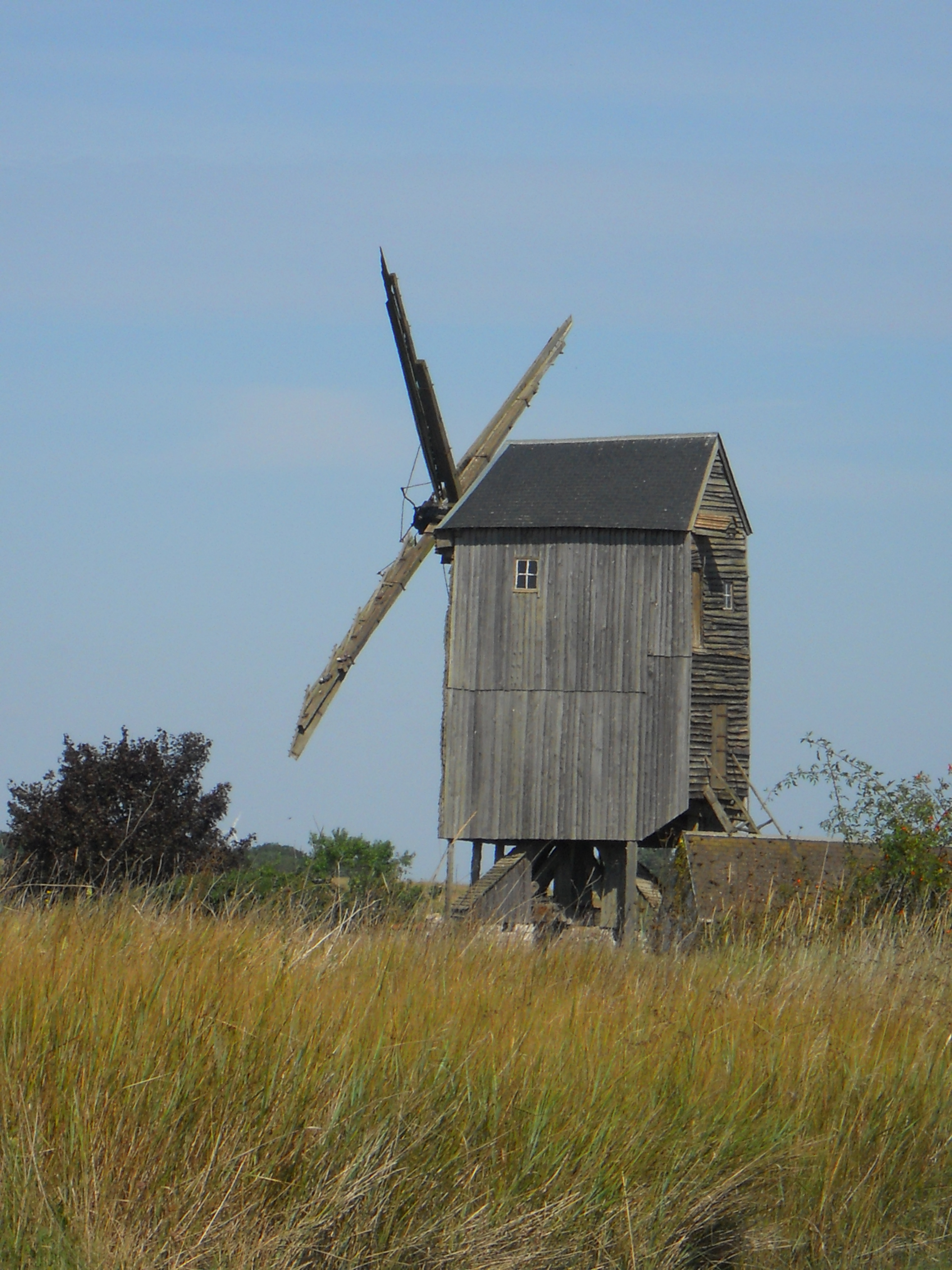
- The windmill in Bazoches-en-Dunois
- Location of Bazoches-en-Dunois
- Location within France Location within Centre-Val de Loire
- Coordinates: 48°06′13″N 1°33′58″E
- Country: France
- Region: Centre-Val de Loire
- Department: Eure-et-Loir
- Arrondissement: Châteaudun
- Canton: Les Villages Vovéens
- Intercommunality: Cœur de Beauce

Government
  - Mayor (2020–2026): Guy Billault
- Area^{1}: 18.68 km^{2} (7.21 sq mi)
- Elevation: 136 m (446 ft)
- Highest elevation: 139 m (456 ft)
- Lowest elevation: 112 m (367 ft)
- Population (2023): 263
  - Density: 14.1/km^{2} (36.5/sq mi)
- Time zone: UTC+01:00 (CET)
  - Summer (DST): UTC+02:00 (CEST)
- INSEE/Postal code: 28028 /28140
- ^{1} French Land Register data, which excludes lakes, ponds, glaciers > 1 km^{2} (0.386 sq mi or 247 acres) and river estuaries.

Bazoches-en-Dunois is a commune in the Eure-et-Loir department in northern France.

== Population ==
Historical population
Year	Pop.	±% p.a.
1968	346	—
1975	295	−2.25%
1982	254	−2.12%
1990	235	−0.97%
1999	237	+0.09%
2007	259	+1.12%
2012	257	−0.15%
2017	258	+0.08%
2023	263	+0.32%
Source: INSEE

== See also ==
- Communes of the Eure-et-Loir department
