= Ottaviano Jannella =

Italian sculptor (1635–1661)

Ottaviano Jannella (December 23, 1635 – December 10, 1661) was an Italian sculptor of the Baroque period.

== Biography ==
He was born in Ascoli Piceno to Jannello Jannella and Ippolita Tuzi. With his skill at miniature carving and intaglio work, he initially joined the studio of Gian Lorenzo Bernini in Rome. He entered the patronage of Cardinal Ottoboni, but once the Cardinal left for Ravenna, Ottaviano moved to work in Brescia, Verona, and Florence.

He had a remarkable talent in the art of carving tiny objects in wood. Orphaned as a young man, he presented himself to Bernini and was hired for his studio. school. He astounded his peers by the unique intricacy of his minute works, which he completed unaided. For models, he preferred to create models derived from ancient statuary, and his small studio contained drawings, carvings and models taken from the antique, or by the artists of the previous centuries. In pieces of wood the size of a nut, he was able to carve stories with multiple figures and objects, such as a passion scene of Christ, complete with a crown of thorns on the head of Christ. Or he would carve a surface full of tiny figures of two armies in battle, thin arabesques intertwining across the scene. he carved on another piece, a prodigious hunting scene with multitude of hunters and horses, and forests with parts that seem slimmer than a spider's web in a network of almost surpassing subtlety. He died at the age of twenty-five years in Rome, about 1630.
