= Louis XIV Victory Monument =

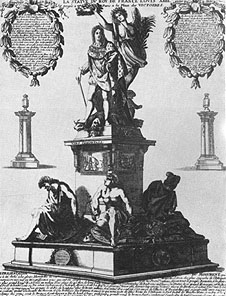
Late-17th-century engraving of the monument and two of the three-columned lanterns

The Louis XIV Victory Monument was an elaborate trophy memorial celebrating the military and domestic successes of the early decades of Louis XIV's personal rule, primarily those during the Franco-Dutch War of 1672–1678, on the Place des Victoires (Victories' Square) in central Paris. It was designed and sculpted by Martin Desjardins between 1682 and 1686 on a commission by François d'Aubusson, Duke of La Feuillade. The monument's centerpiece, a colossal statue of Louis XIV crowned by an allegory of victory, was destroyed in 1792 during the French Revolution. Significant other parts of the monument have been preserved and are now mostly kept at the Louvre.

Together with the two triumphal arches, the Porte Saint-Denis (1672) and Porte Saint-Martin (1674), and echoing the Hall of Mirrors in the Palace of Versailles (decorated 1680–1684), the Victory Monument marked the high point of public exaltation of Louis XIV's military glory and European dominance in the urban landscape of Paris, before the setbacks and exhaustion that would come later in his reign with the Nine Years' War and War of the Spanish Succession.

== Background ==
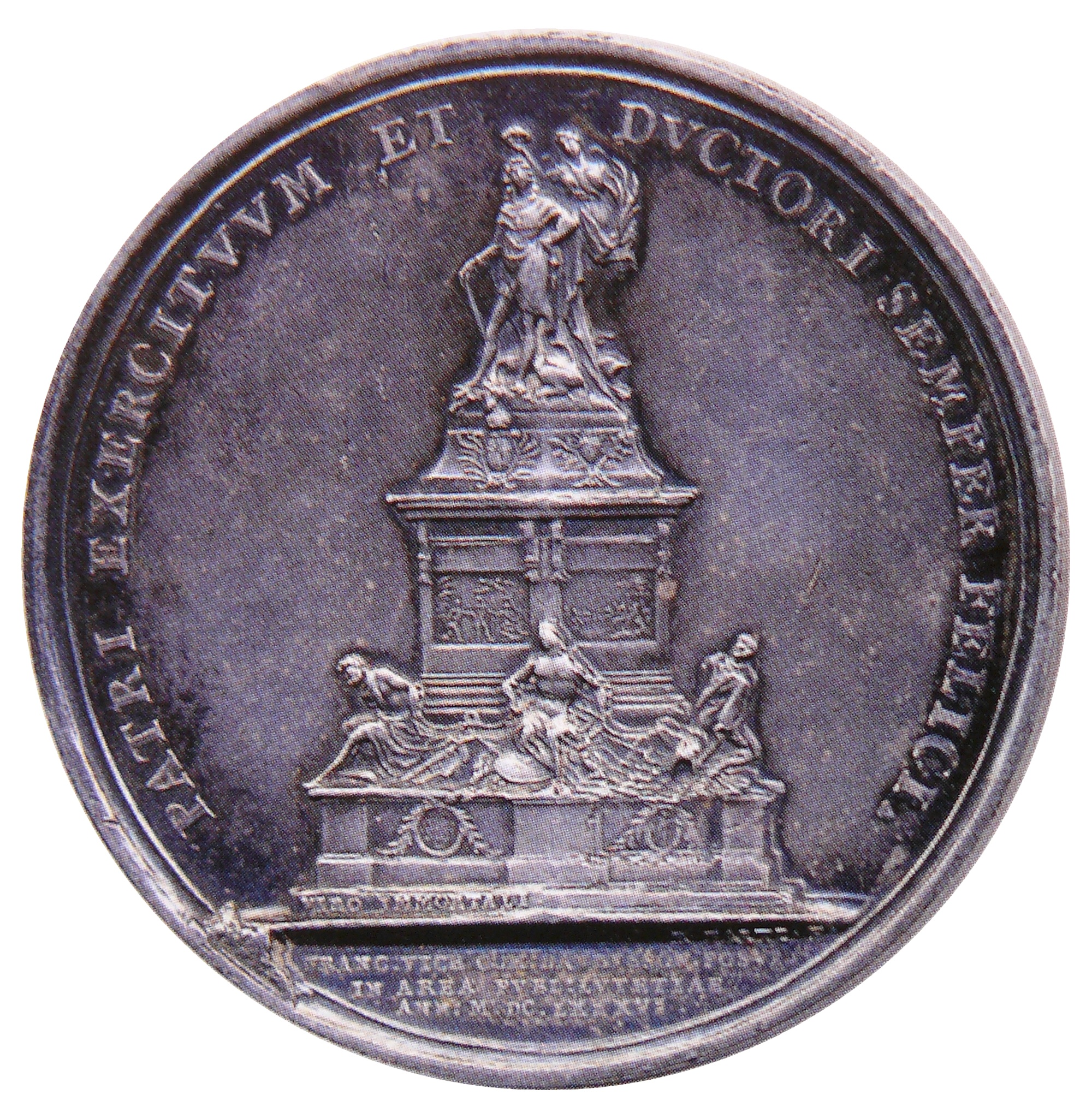
Medal commemorating the monument's inauguration, by Joseph Roettiers and Jean Dollin (1686)

Prominent courtier François III d'Aubusson, Duke of La Feuillade planned the Place des Victoires as both a property development project and a celebration of Louis XIV following the Treaties of Nijmegen, which in the late 1670s had put an end to his previous career as a military leader. He formed the plan in 1681 and purchased part of the grounds in 1684, the rest being acquired for the same purpose by the City of Paris. While not much is known about the details of the planning process, it is probable that Louis XIV's entourage, if not the king itself, was involved in the definition of its program of monarchical glorification, so that the monument eventually appears as a hybrid of private initiative and official project. The iconographic program echoes that of the ceiling of the Hall of Mirrors in Versailles and includes several of the same episodes, even though the depictions on the Victory Monument make less systematic use of allegory.

La Feuillade had previously ordered a marble statue of Louis XIV from Desjardins in 1679. He offered it to the king in 1683 and it was placed in the Versailles Orangerie in 1684, where it remains to this day after having been altered during the Revolution and subsequently restored by Jean-François Lorta in 1815–1816. That statue served as an inspiration for that on the Victory Monument, even though the king's attire differs: ancient Roman in Versailles, versus coronation garb in Paris.

La Feuillade commissioned Desjardins to create the victory monument in 1682. The monument was completed and inaugurated on 26 March 1686, even as the surrounding buildings were unfinished or not started yet.

== Description ==
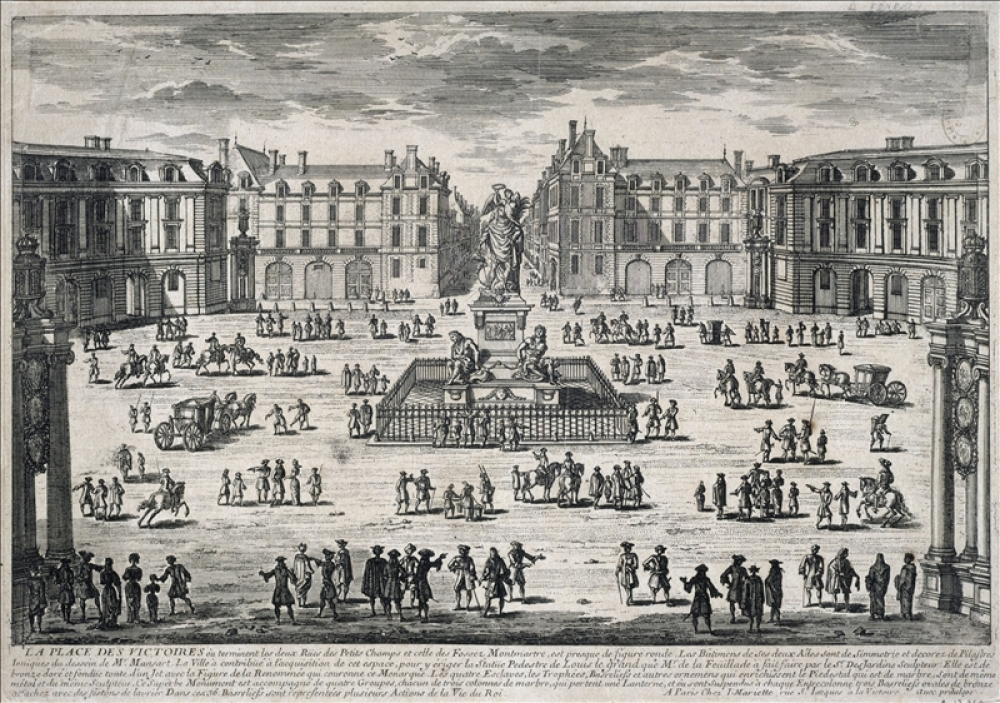
The square, monument, and four lanterns, by Adam Perelle (late 1680s / early 1690s)

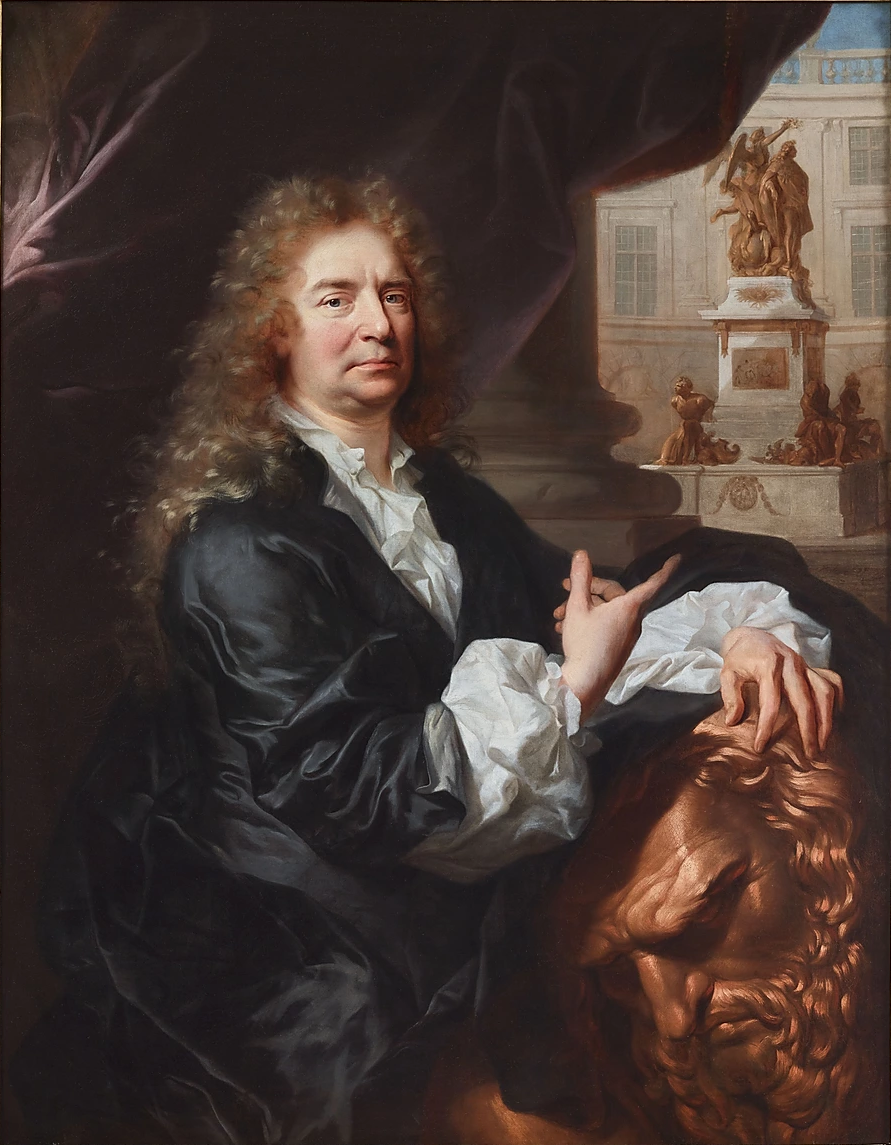
Portrait of Martin Desjardins by Hyacinthe Rigaud in 1686, with the monument in the background, now at Versailles

=== Monument proper ===
At the center of the square, the monument itself stood and consisted of three sections: a base with larger-than-life bronze statues of prisoners and military spoils; a square pedestal with four bronze reliefs commemorating specific events; and a colossal gilded statue of Louis XIV in coronation robe, trampling on Cerberus, with an allegory of Victory standing behind him on a globe and holding a laurel wreath above his head. The statue was more than four meters high, and the entire monument's total height was about 12 meters. The monument included numerous celebratory inscriptions, including a main dedication in Latin on the front which read Viro Immortali ("To the Immortal Man"), an unambiguous reference to Louis.

Each of the four prisoners simultaneously evoked an age of life and a specific emotion, and was also widely understood to refer to a vanquished nation: youth / hope / Spain; adulthood / rebellion / Holland; middle age / grief / Brandenburg; and old age / despondency / the Holy Roman Empire. The link with European states, however, was not made entirely explicit. Three of the figures were easy to identify as they represented France's main adversaries of the time, but the fourth one, now understood as representing Brandenburg, has been misinterpreted variously in the past as the Duchy of Savoy or the Ottoman Empire. Between them were scattered broken weapons and military emblems, including an imperial ensign that anachronistically combines the SPQR motto of ancient Rome with the double-headed eagle of the Holy Roman Empire.

Desjardins's relief plates on the pedestal commemorated four events viewed as particularly representative of Louis XIV's glory: on the front, an allegory of the Peace of Nijmegen of 1678–1679, with Louis XIV bringing Peace to Europe, the latter two represented as female allegories; on the rear, an idealized depiction of Louis XIV accepting the excuses of Spain's ambassador on 24 March 1662, a noted episode in the history of precedence among European monarchies; and on the sides, two military actions in which La Feuillade had participated, the crossing of the Rhine of June 1672 and the siege of Besançon of 1674. Desjardins was also commissioned to produce four circular medallions (tondi) in bronze for the base of the monument, but only two were eventually installed there while the other two were replaced by inscriptions: The Destruction of Heresy, referring to the Edict of Fontainebleau of 1685 that revoked the Edict of Nantes of 1598 and led to the expulsion of France's Protestants or Huguenots; and The Abolition of Duels, referring to Louis's various initiatives starting in 1662 and especially his ordinance of 1679 by which he attempted to put an end to duels as a form of private justice in the French nobility. Desjardins's other two medallions, on the Doge of Genoa and the Swedes in Germany, were reused in the side lanterns.

=== Side lanterns and medallions ===
Around the monument, on four points of the near-circular square, were monumental lanterns (French: fanaux), each of them made of three columns of colored marble holding a naval lamp and decorated with two garlands of three circular medallions each, thus six by lantern. These lanterns provided for the illumination of the square and monument at night. In practice, however, they were not all completed. Some of the medallions were only temporary ones made in stucco, and possibly no more than half of the total (i.e. a dozen) were produced in bronze. Aside from the two initially created by Desjardins for the central monument, the others medallions were created by Flemish sculptor Jean Regnault (or Arnould) and caster Pierre Le Nègre, based on drawings by Pierre Mignard.

A contemporary engraving gives the following list for the themes of the 24 medallions: 1. Battle of Rocroi in 1643; 2. Restoration of military discipline (reform of 1665); 3. Dutch rescued in Münster, 1664 (actually 1665 during the Second Anglo-Dutch War); 4. Fight of Saint-Gotthard in Hungary, 1665 (actually 1664); 5. Tournai, Lille and C. taken in 1667 (during the War of Devolution; "C." may be either Courtrai or Charleroi); 6. Justice reform in 1667 (the Code Louis); 7. Pyramid erected in Rome in 1664 and torn down in 1668 (the Corsican Guard Affair); 8. Takeover of Maastricht in 1673; 9. Battle of Seneffe in 1674; 10. Victorious fights in Germany in 1674 and 1675; 11. Naval fight in Sicily, 1676 (presumably the Battle of Augusta); 12. Battle of Palermo, 1676; 13. Storming of Valenciennes, 1677; 14. Battle of Cassel, 1677; 15. Takeover of Cambrai, 1677; 16. Dutch fleet burnt at Tobago in America, 1676 (actually 1677); 17. Ghent taken in 1678; 18. Swedes reestablished in Germany, 1679 (by the Treaty of Fontainebleau); 19. [?] and Strasbourg returned on the same day, 1681 (during the War of the Reunions); 20. Capture of Luxembourg, 1684; 21. The Junction of the Two Seas (by the Canal du Midi in 1681); 22. Submission of Genoa, 1685 (Doge Francesco Maria Imperiale Lercari's visit to Versailles); 23. The seas freed from the pirates, 1685; 24. Ambassadors from Muscovy in 1668 (Pyotr Potemkin), 1681 (Pyotr Potemkin and Stefan Volkov) and 1685 (Semyon Erofeevich Almazov and Semyon Ippolitov), of Guinea in 1670 (Matteo Lopes, on behalf of the Kingdom of Allada), of Morocco and Fez in 1682 (Mohammad Temim, on behalf of Ismail Ibn Sharif), of Siam in 1684 (led by Bénigne Vachet, preceding the grander embassy of 1686), and of Algiers in 1683 (Djiafar-Aga-Effendi, during the French-Algerian War).

== Reception ==
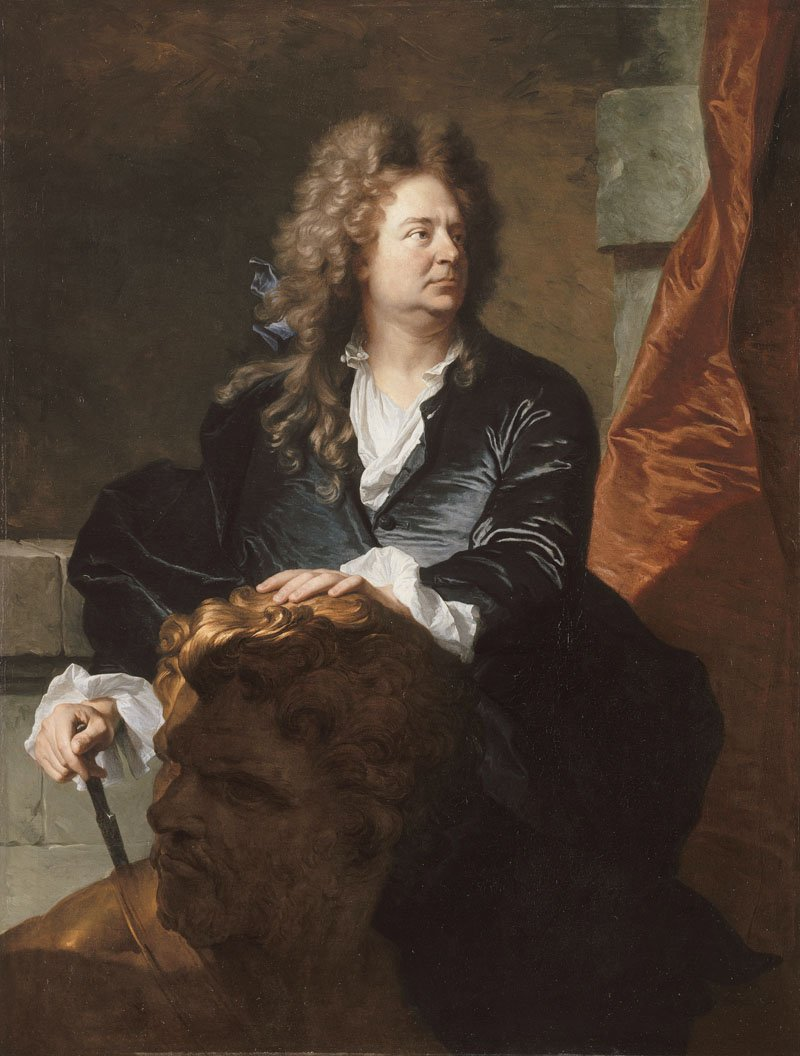
Portrait of Martin Desjardins by Hyacinthe Rigaud in 1692, with his hand on the captive statue of Holland; now at the Louvre

The monument was generally well received on esthetic grounds and was widely considered Desjardins's major masterpiece. In the 1692 portrait of Desjardins submitted by Hyacinthe Rigaud for entry into the Académie royale de peinture et de sculpture, the sitter was represented with his hand on the captive statue of Holland.

At the same time, the entire project was criticized for the unrestrained adulation of Louis XIV and humiliation of fellow European nations that were inherent in the program. The March 1686 inauguration ceremony, complete with artillery salvos, military march, incense and genuflections, was considered way over the top by the Duke of Saint-Simon who attended it while a child and found it verging on cult. François-Timoléon de Choisy similarly mocked the elevation of Louis to godlike status as a hubristic echo of pagan Roman emperor-worship. Anonymous poems, pamphlets and caricatures were circulated both in France and abroad, lambasting the monument and not least the "immortal man" dedicace, which, by denying the monarch's mortality, put into question his responsibility before God.

The offensive depiction of France's neighbors as vanquished captives did nothing to help French diplomacy, and was viewed several decades later as having possibly contributed to the kingdom's isolation. A follow-up bombastic urban design project on a larger scale than the Place des Victoires, started in 1685 and intended to be named the Place de Nos Conquêtes, was sharply toned down in 1699 to a more domestically-focused Place Louis-le-Grand. That year, Louis XIV's senior official Louis Phélypeaux, comte de Pontchartrain specifically referred in a letter to the Académie des Inscriptions to the "reliefs, slaves, and inscriptions of the statue of the Place des Victoires" as the example not to follow while aiming at something "wise and reasonable" for the new square, now known as the Place Vendôme.

== Later history ==
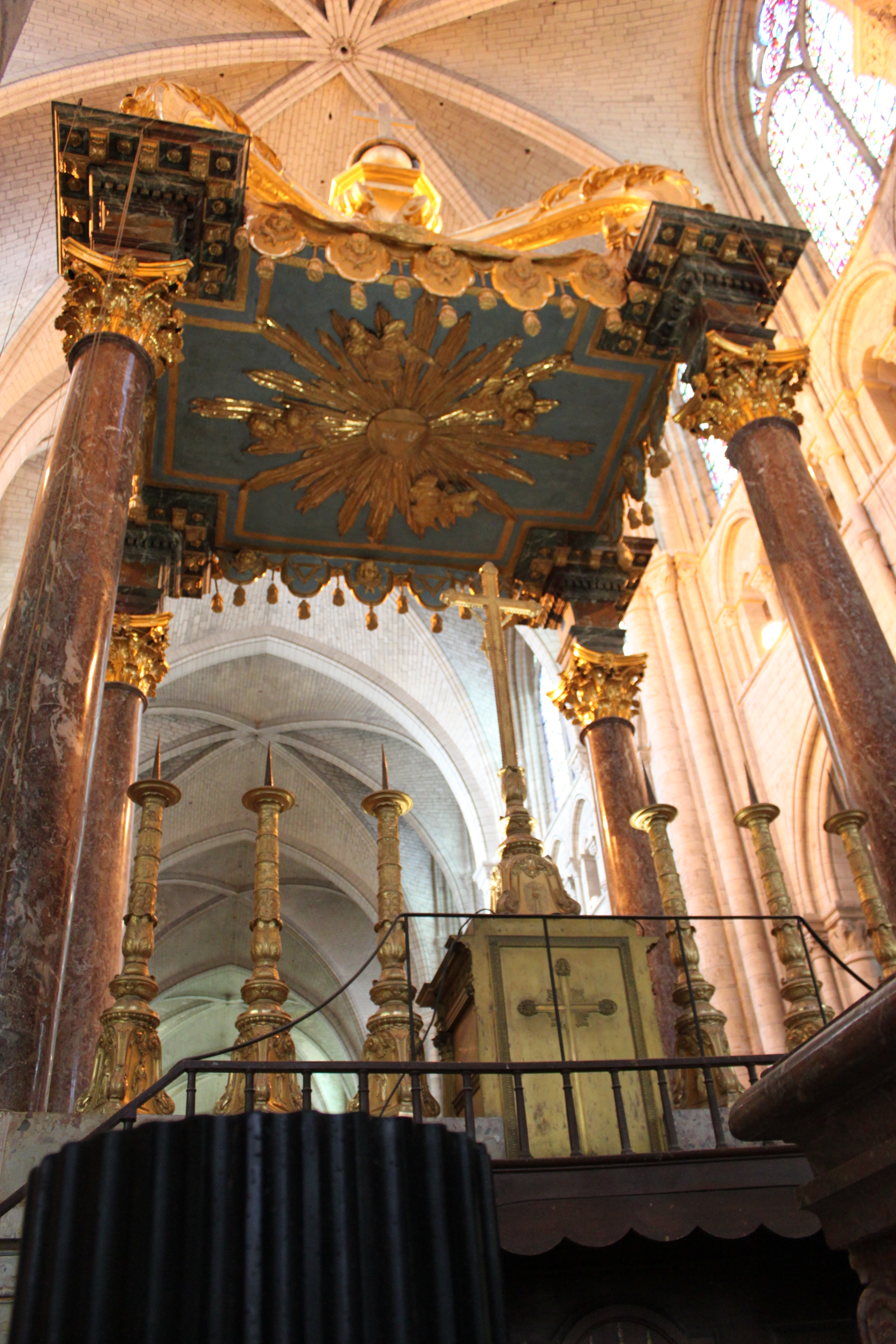
Altar baldachin of Sens Cathedral (1742), re-employing four of the lanterns' columns

The lanterns were permanently turned off in 1699, decommissioned by royal order in 1717 shortly after Louis XIV's death, and dismantled in 1718. La Feuillade's son donated their twelve precious marble columns to the Theatines congregation of Paris, then established on what is now Quai Voltaire, for their unfinished church. After his death in 1725 the Theatines, who were short of money, sold them to the Paris Foreign Missions Society, the Couvent de la Madeleine de Traisnel, and Sens Cathedral. The latter reemployed four of the columns for its altar baldachin, erected in 1742 under Archbishop Jean-Joseph Languet de Gergy on a design by Giovanni Niccolò Servandoni.

In 1790, the statues of the captives, deemed an offense to the new spirit of freedom, were "liberated" and initially relocated at the Louvre Palace. On 10 August 1792, during that day's insurrection, the monument's main statue was toppled to be melted into cannons. Parts of the decoration, including the four bronze reliefs, were salvaged by Alexandre Lenoir for his Musée des Monuments français.

A temporary woodwork monument was erected to celebrate the insurrectionist victims of 10 August 1792, which in turn was removed during the Consulate. Napoleon then commissioned a bronze heroic statue of General Louis Desaix which was produced by Claude Dejoux and inaugurated in 1810. The nude sculpture was widely disliked and removed in 1814 before Napoleon's fall. Its metal was used for the new Equestrian statue of Henry IV by François-Frédéric Lemot, inaugurated on the Pont Neuf in 1818. A more permanent replacement was erected in 1822, namely an equestrian statue of Louis XIV by François Joseph Bosio. This monument bears no visual relationship with Desjardin's original, even though its program overlaps especially as the 1672 crossing of the Rhine is represented on one of Bosio's two bronze reliefs on the pedestal.

Meanwhile, the statues of the four captives were placed in 1804 in front of Les Invalides, where they remained until 1939. In 1960 their ownership was transferred to the Louvre, which in 1961 had them deposited in the Parc de Sceaux where they remained until 1992. In 1993, in the context of the museum's expansion known as the Grand Louvre project, they were transferred, together with other preserved parts of the monument, to their current location in the newly created Cour Puget, where they dominate the courtyard's lower section.

Eleven bronze medallions are also preserved at the Louvre. The two that decorated the monument's basis became part of the museum's collections in 1836 after having been kept at the Musée des Monuments français:

- The Abolition of Duelling
- The Destruction of Heresy (1685)

Five medallions from the lanterns were purchased during the Revolution by George III of Great Britain and donated by the UK to France in 1914:

- The Restoration of Military Discipline (1665), by Arnould
- The Pyramid of the Corsicans in Rome (1668), by Arnould
- Capture of a City, believed in the past to depict the Siege of Valenciennes (1676–1677), by Arnould
- The Reestablishment of the Swedes in Germany (1679), by Desjardins
- The Submission of the Doge of Genoa (1685), by Desjardins

The remaining four, all by Arnould, were acquired by the Louvre between 1980 and 2006:

- The Victory of Saint Gotthard (1664)
- A second version of The Reestablishment of the Swedes in Germany, after Desjardins's was found not respectful enough of the Swedish monarchy
- The Junction of the Two Seas (1681)
- The Magnificent Buildings of Versailles (which does not appear in the 1686 engraving's list cited above)

== Gallery ==
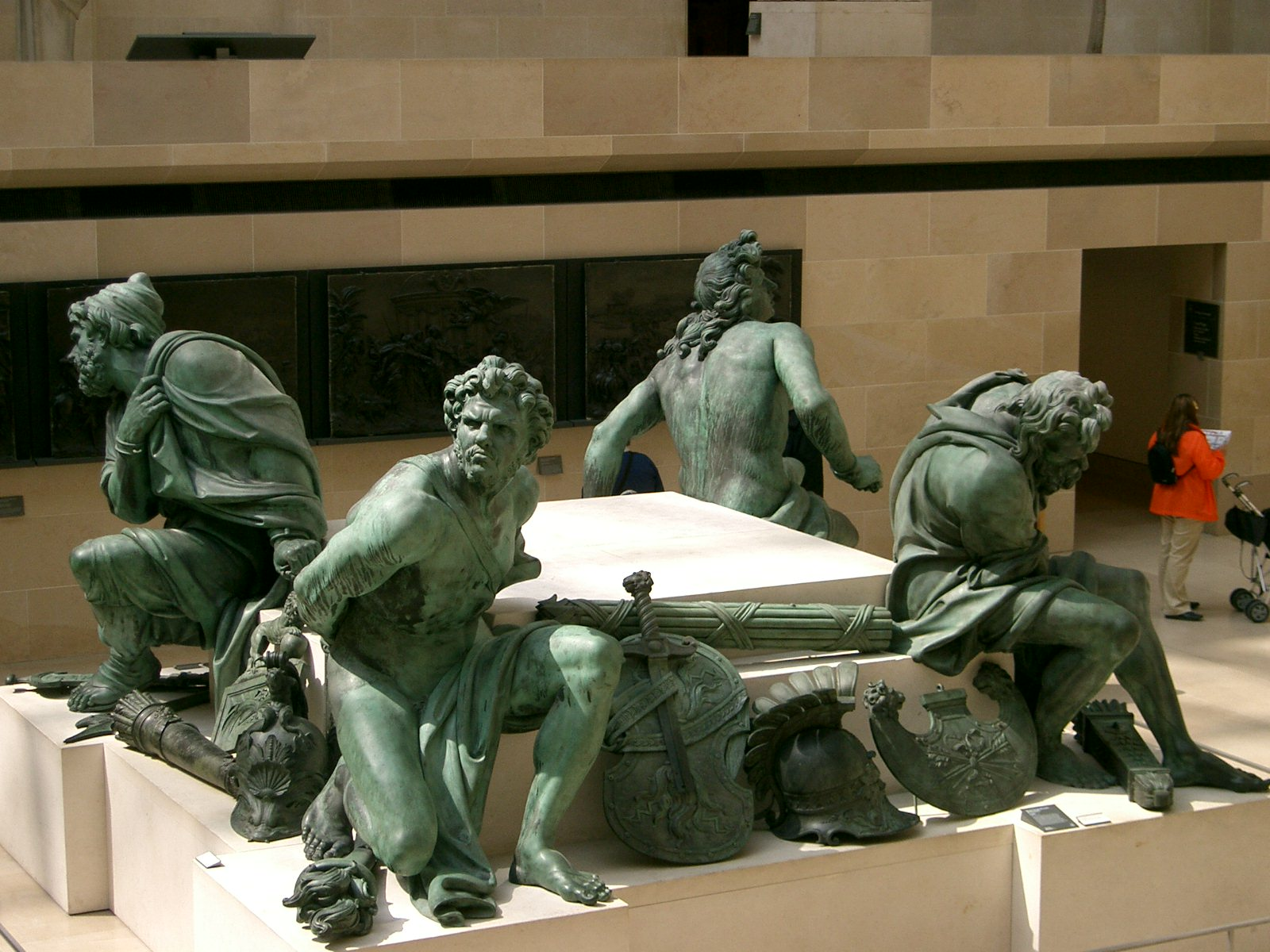
The four captives, now at the Louvre

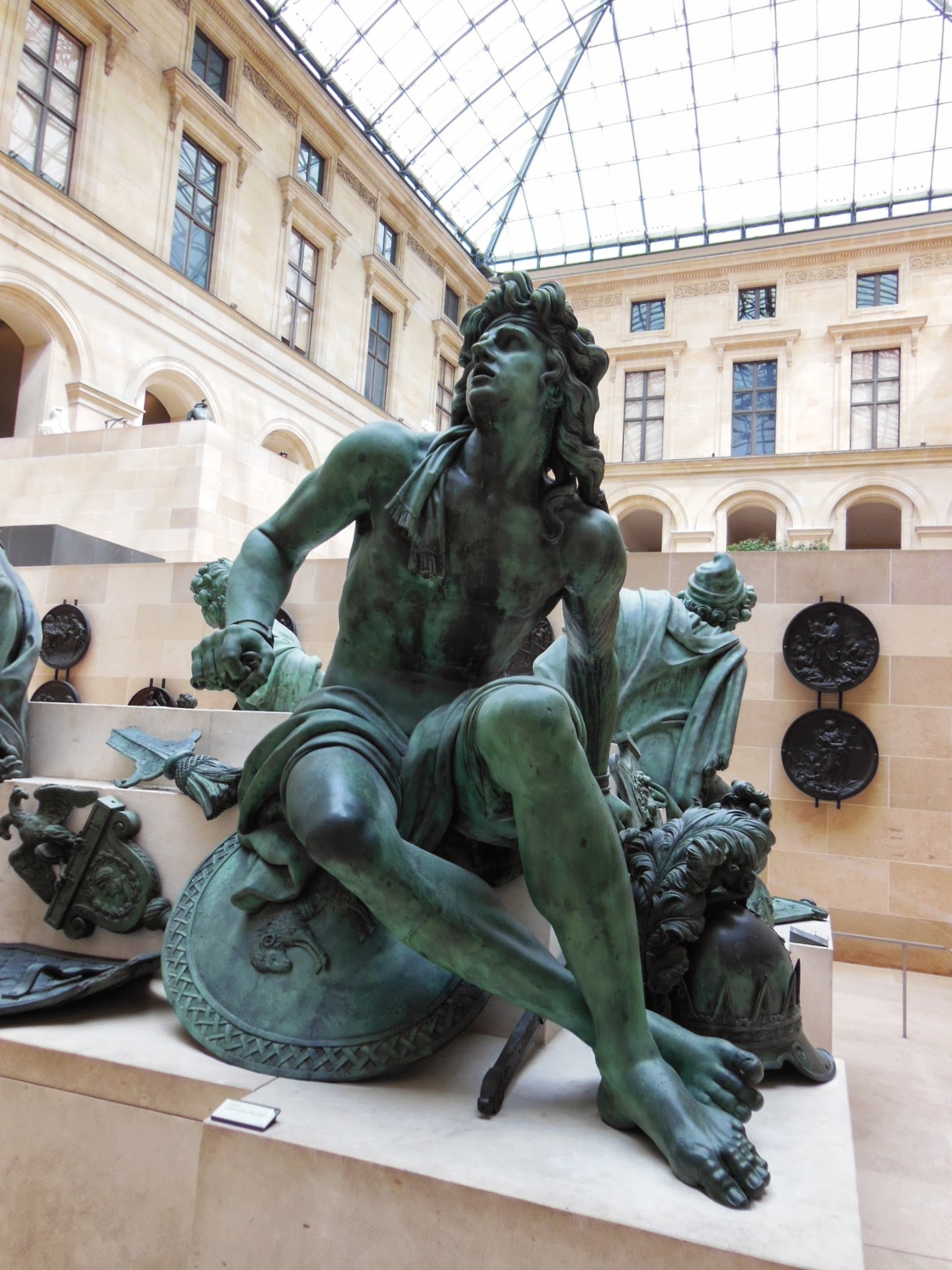
Spain, or Hope

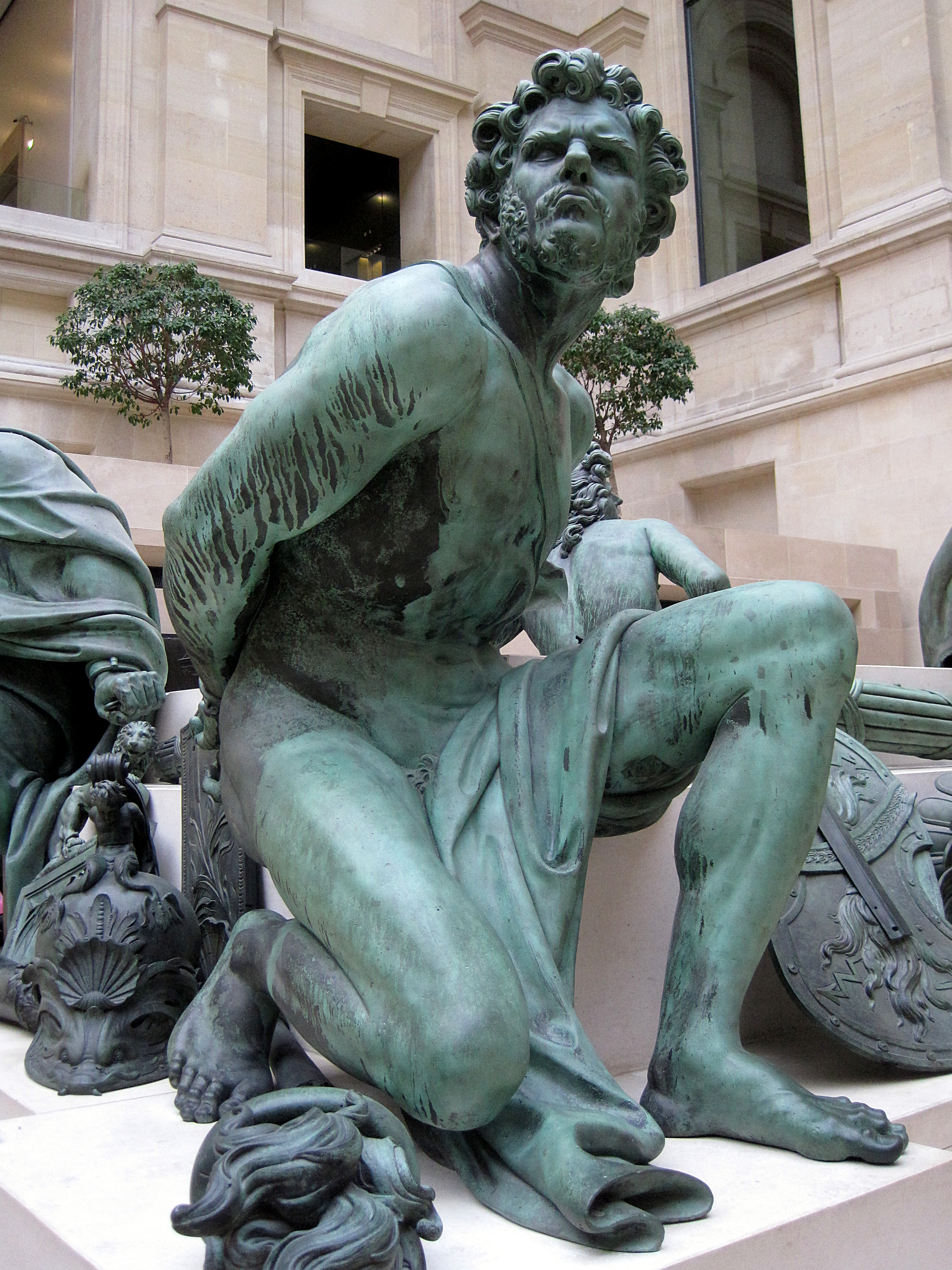
Holland, or Anger

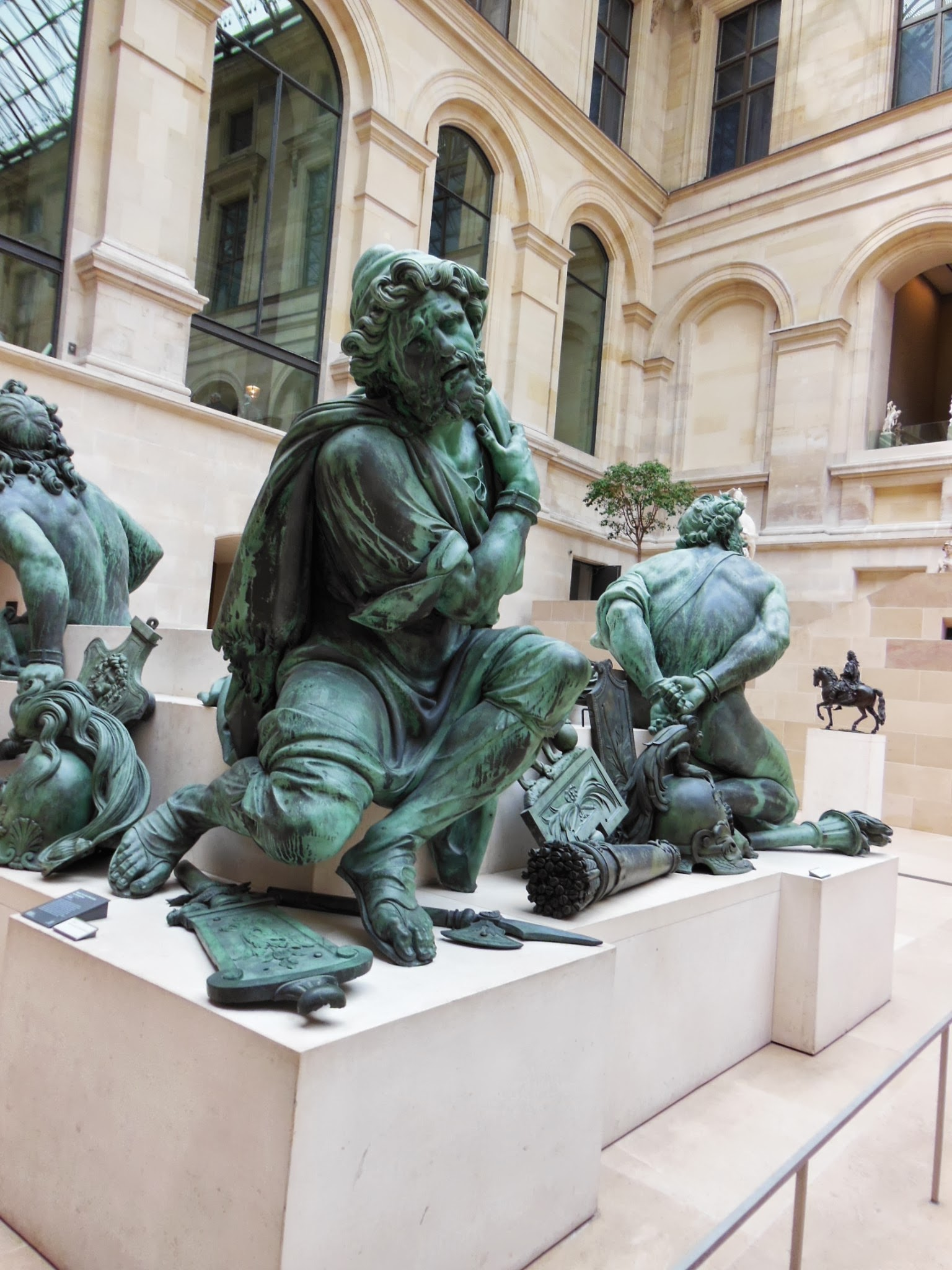
Brandenburg, or Grief

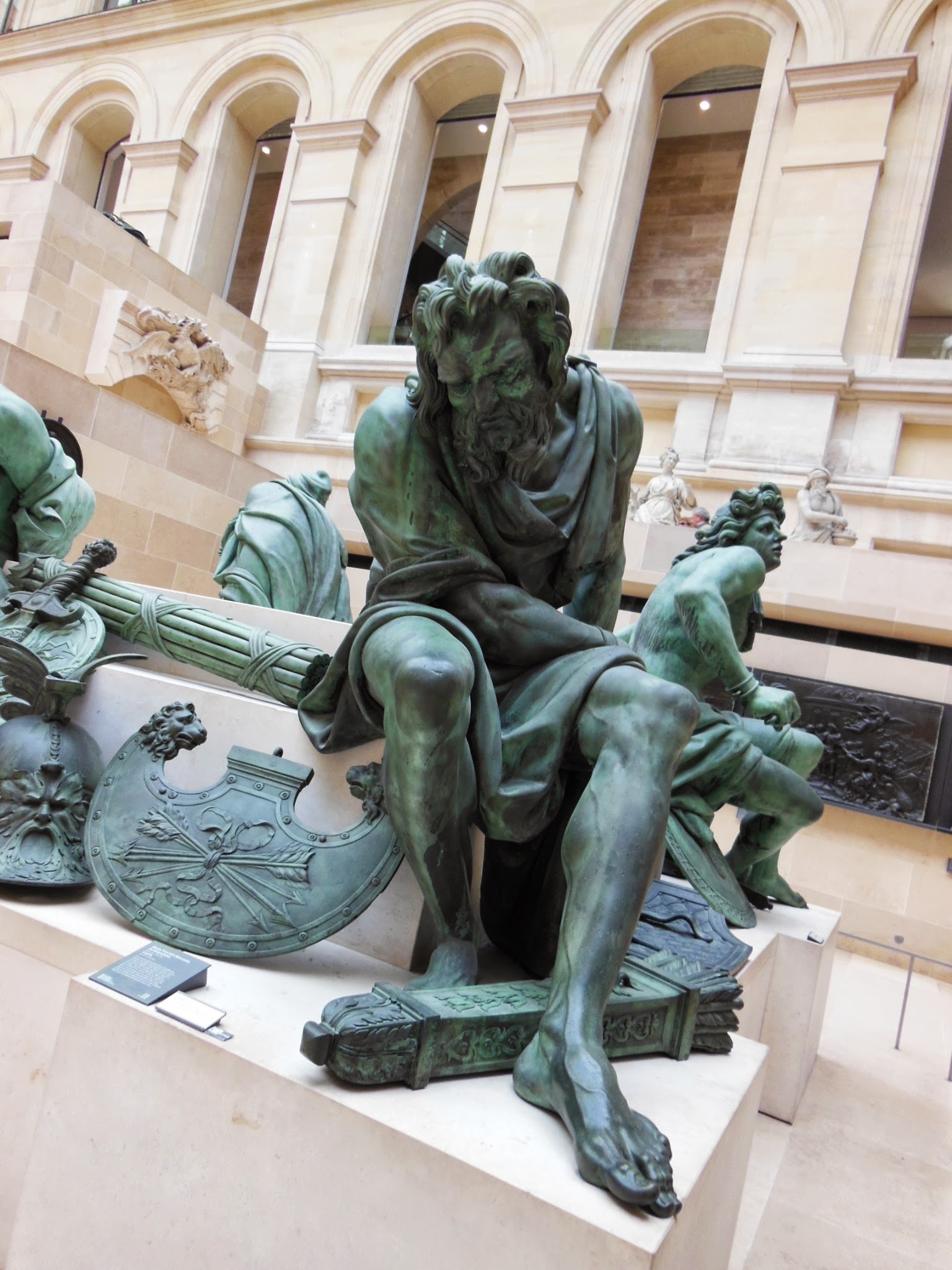
Holy Roman Empire, or Despondency

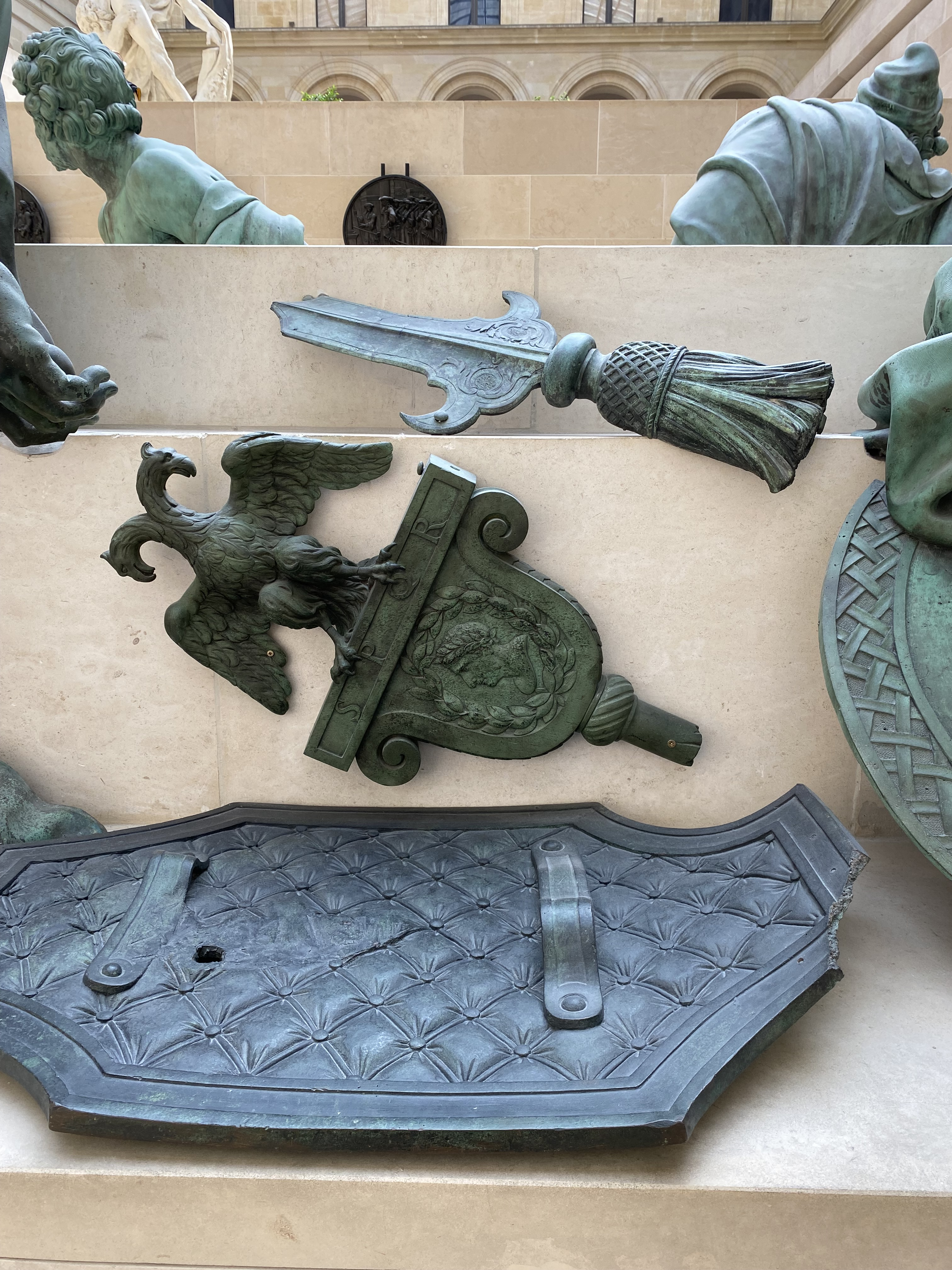
Detail of trophies

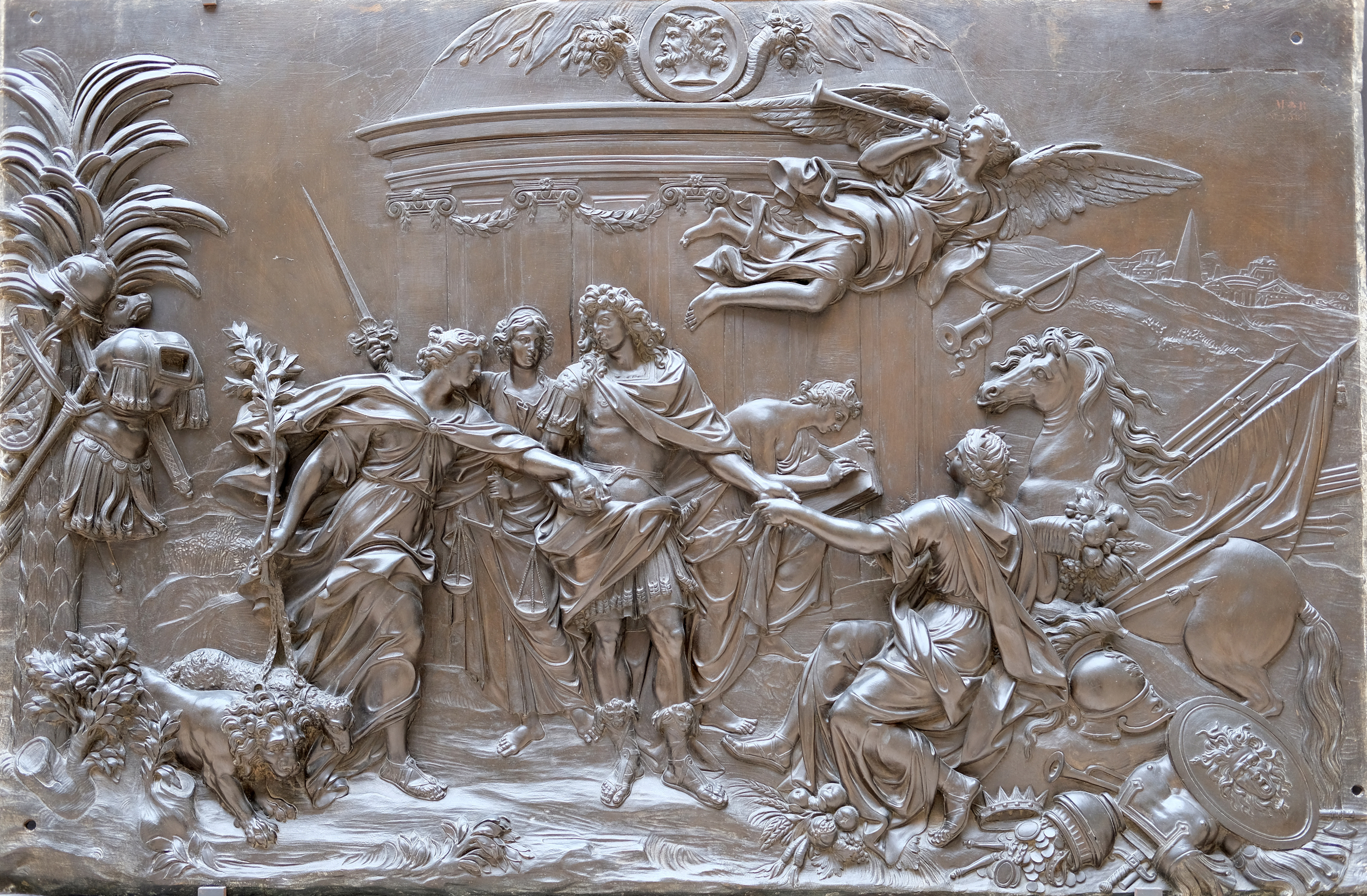
The Peace of Nijmegen, Louvre

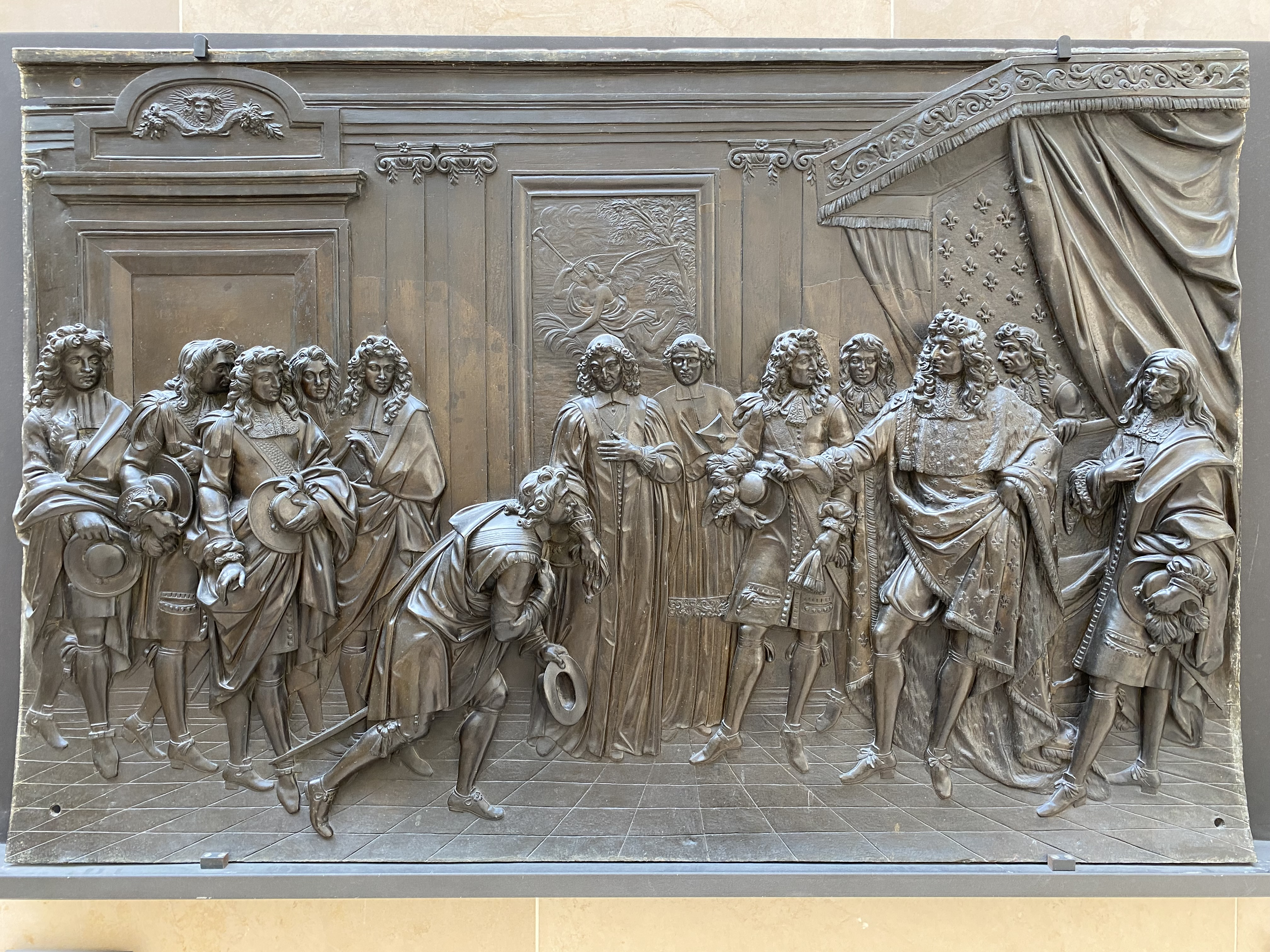
Spain acknowkledges France's precedence, Louvre

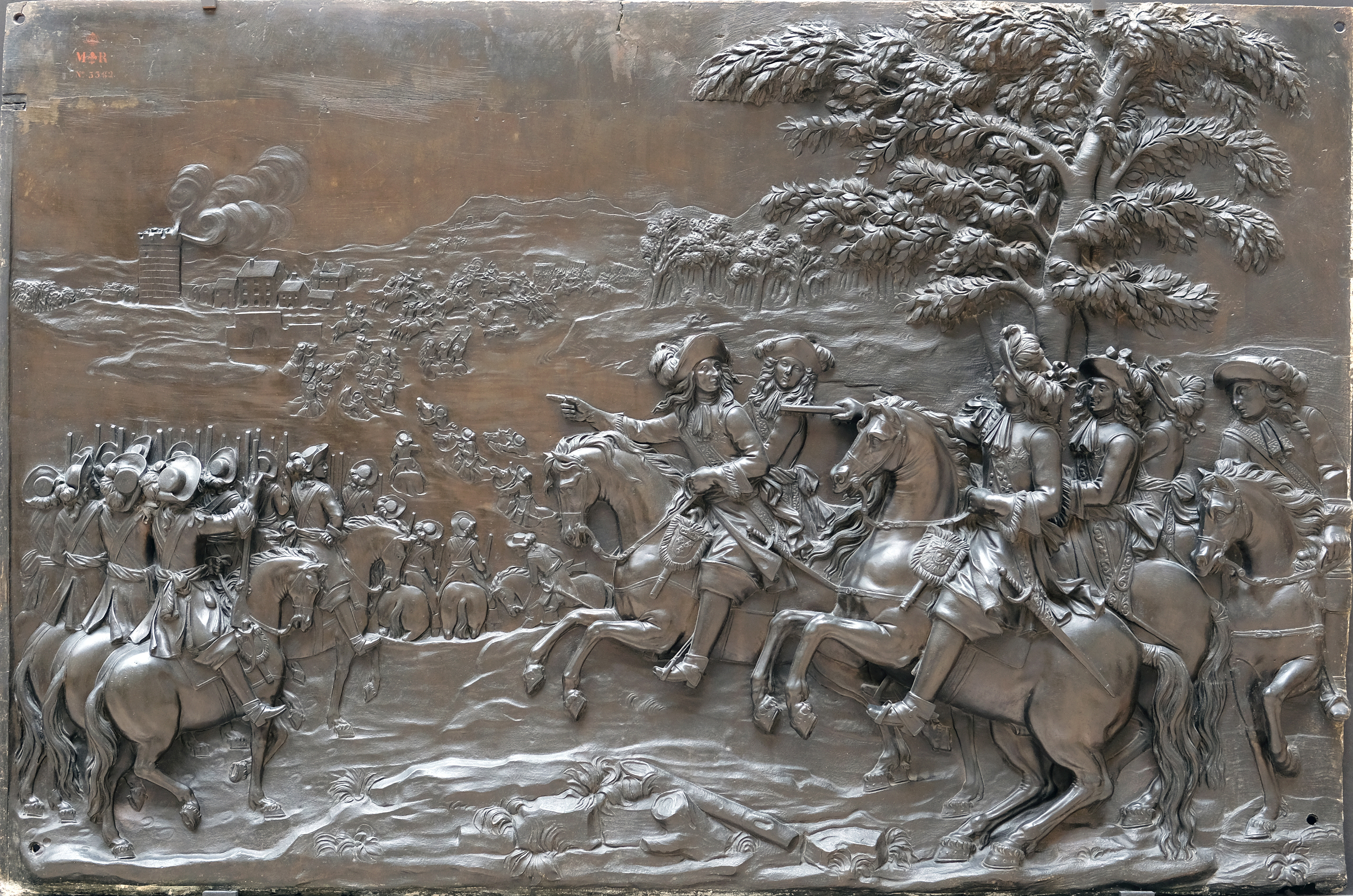
The crossing of the Rhine, Louvre

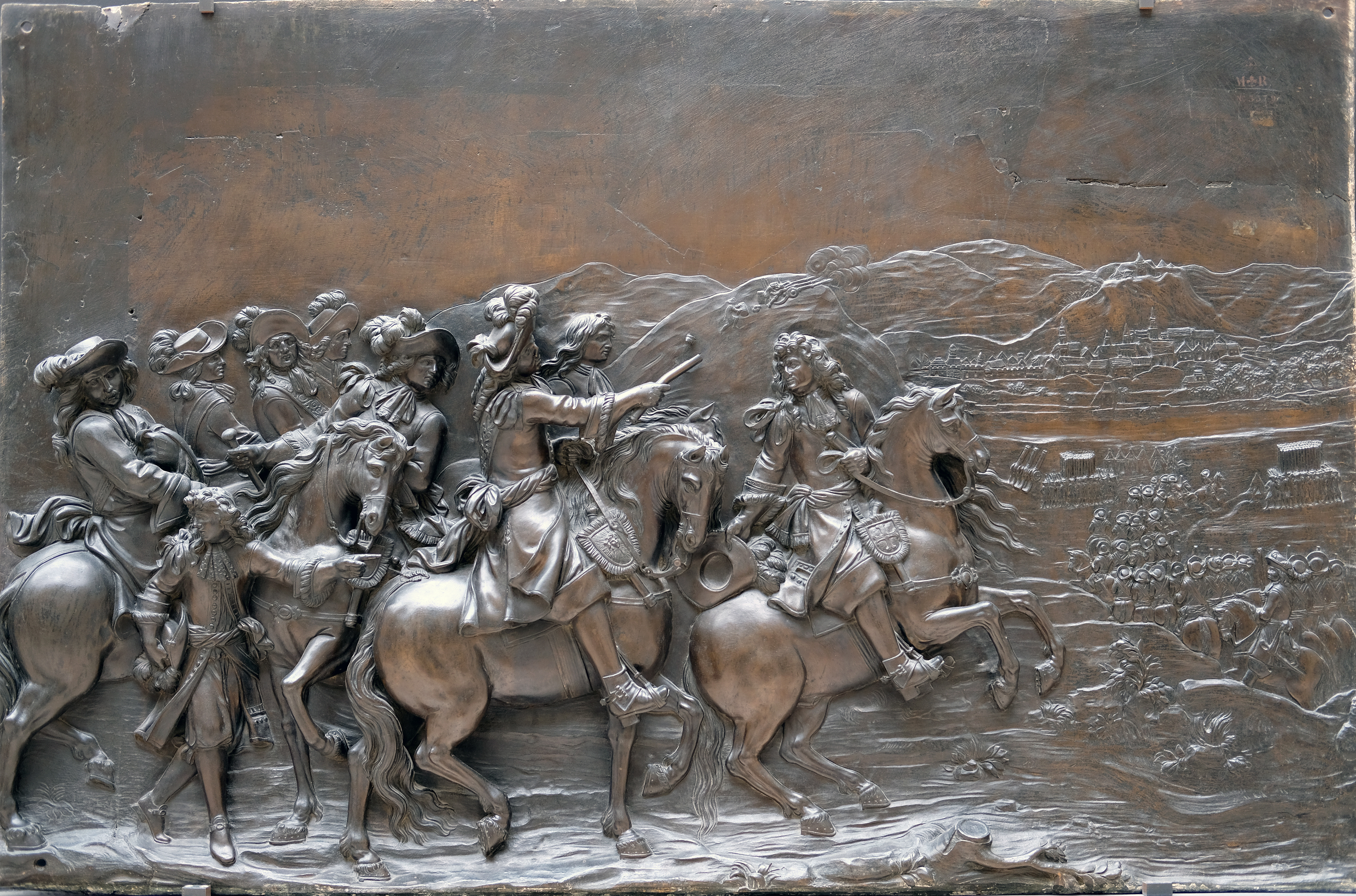
The siege of Besançon, Louvre

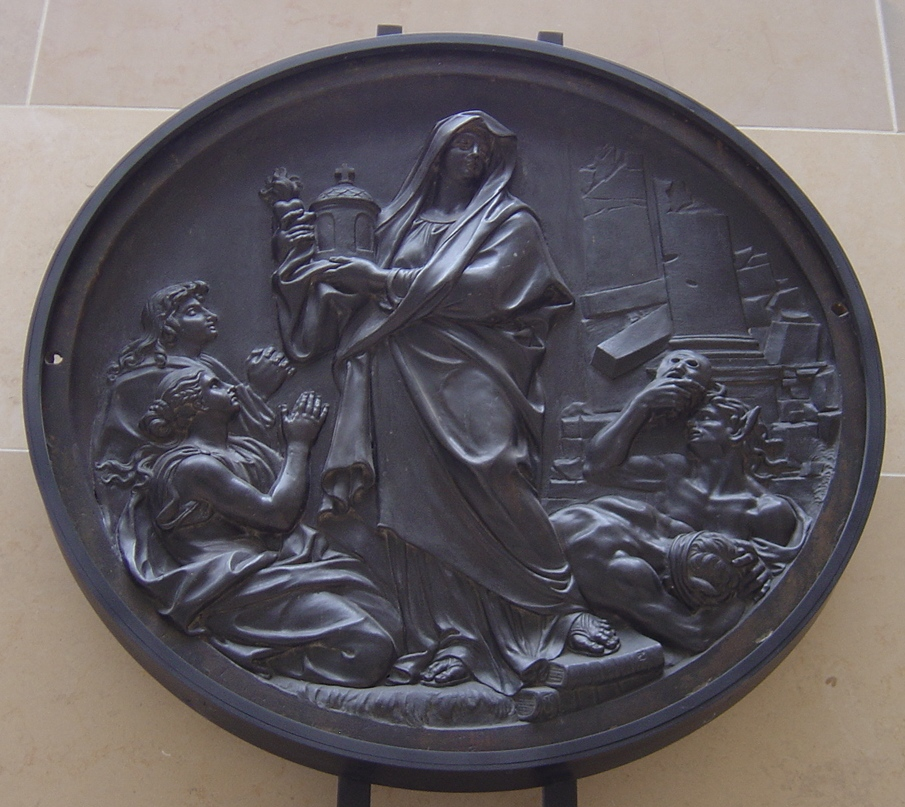
The Destruction of Heresy, Louvre

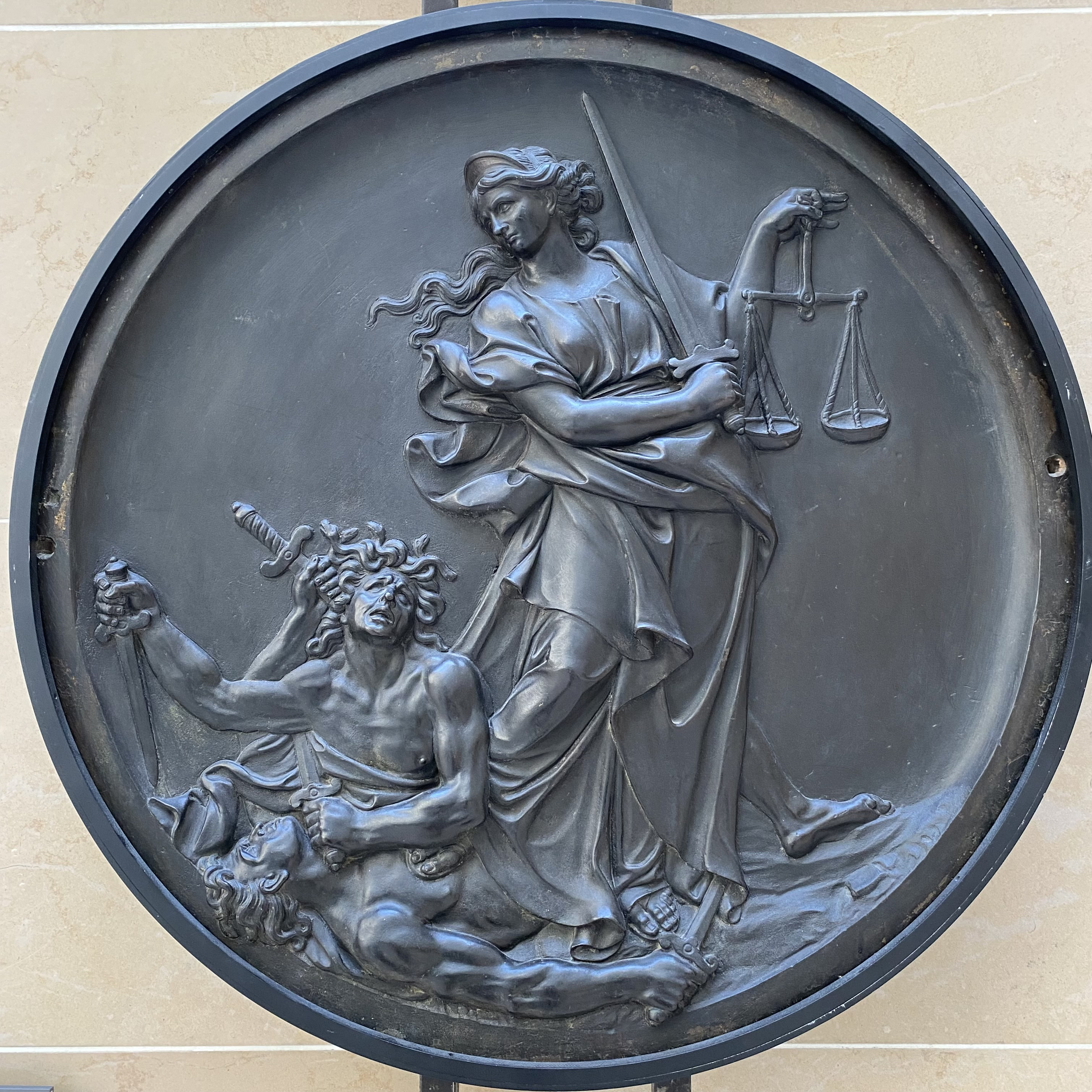
The Abolition of Duelling, Louvre

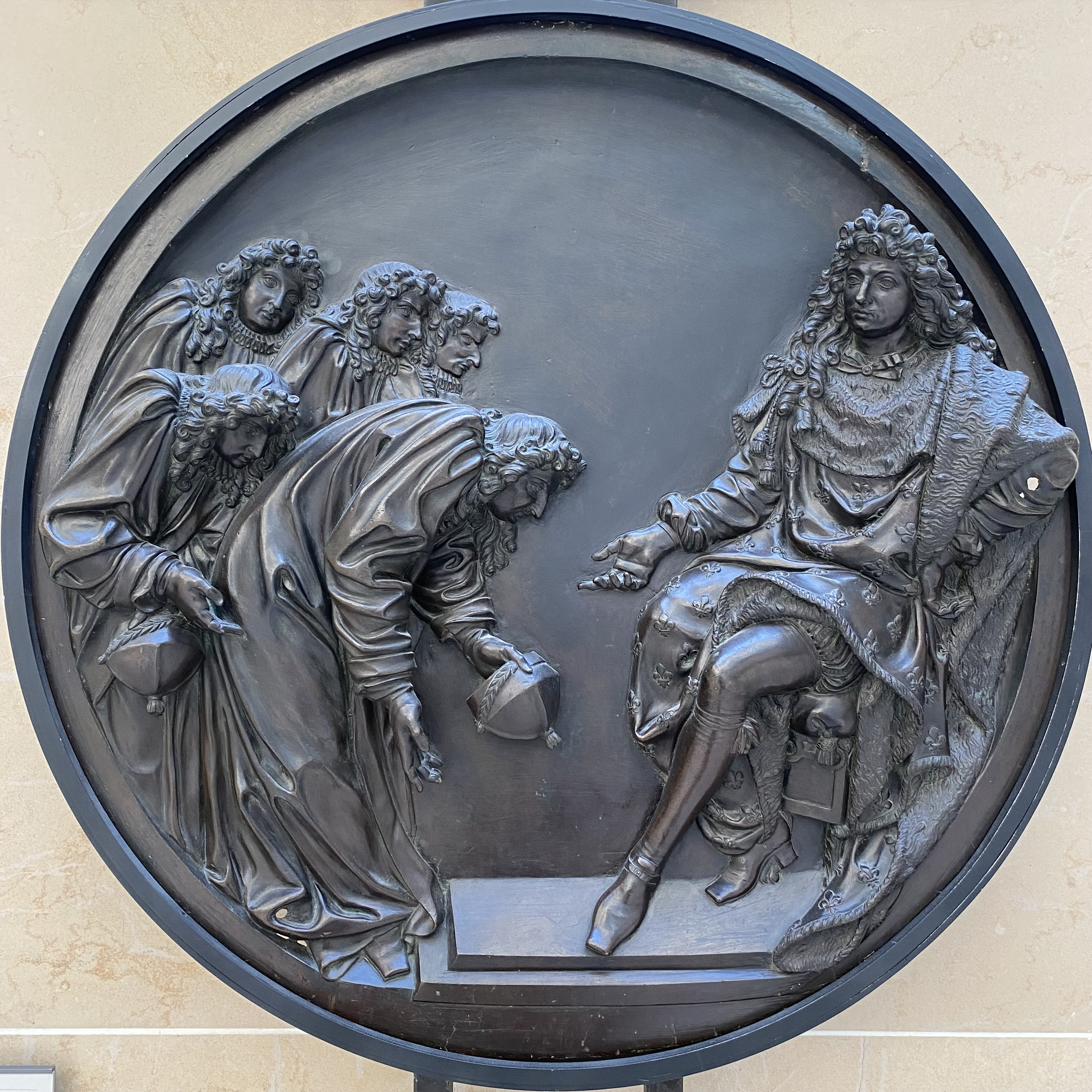
The Submission of the Doge of Genoa, Louvre

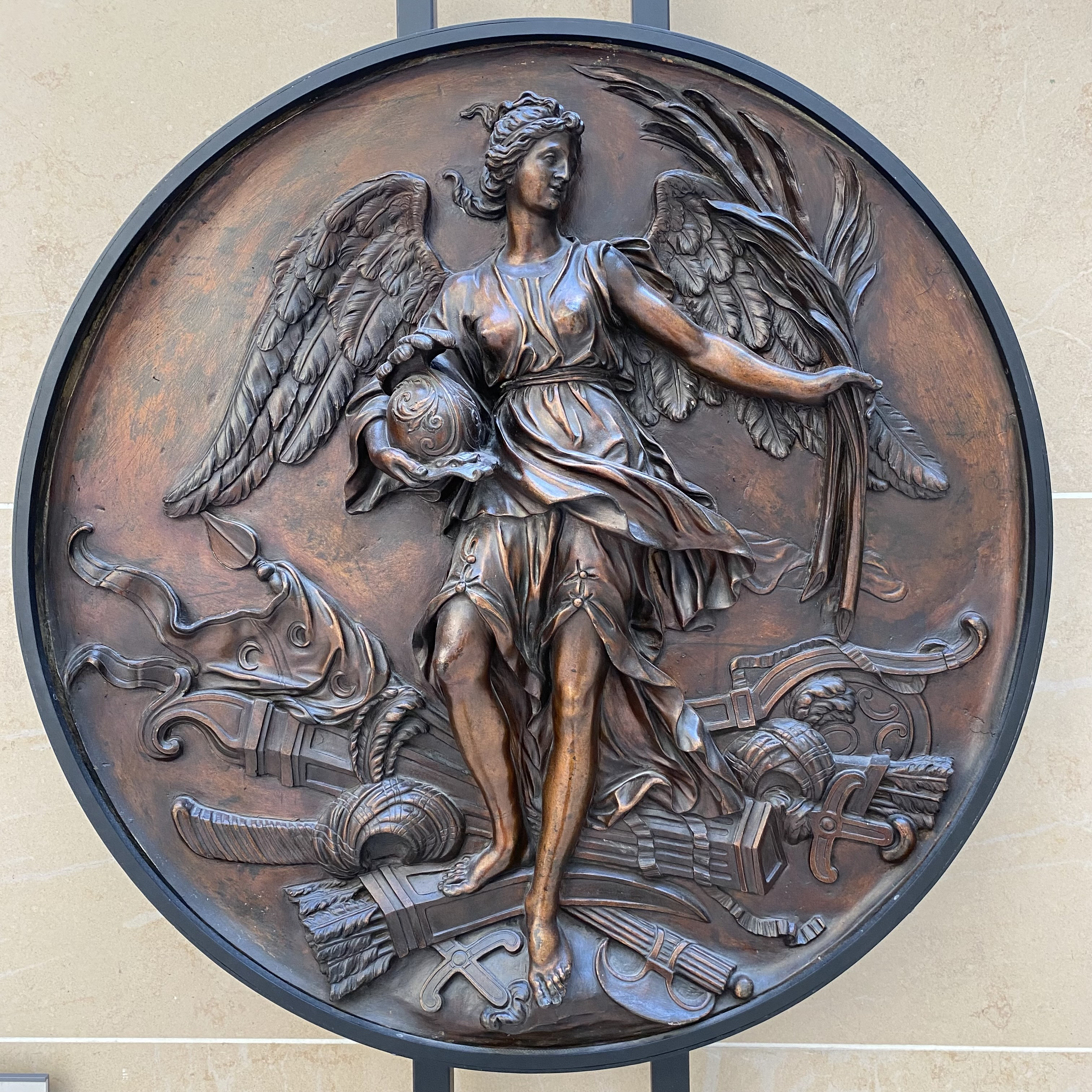
The Victory of Saint Gotthard, Louvre

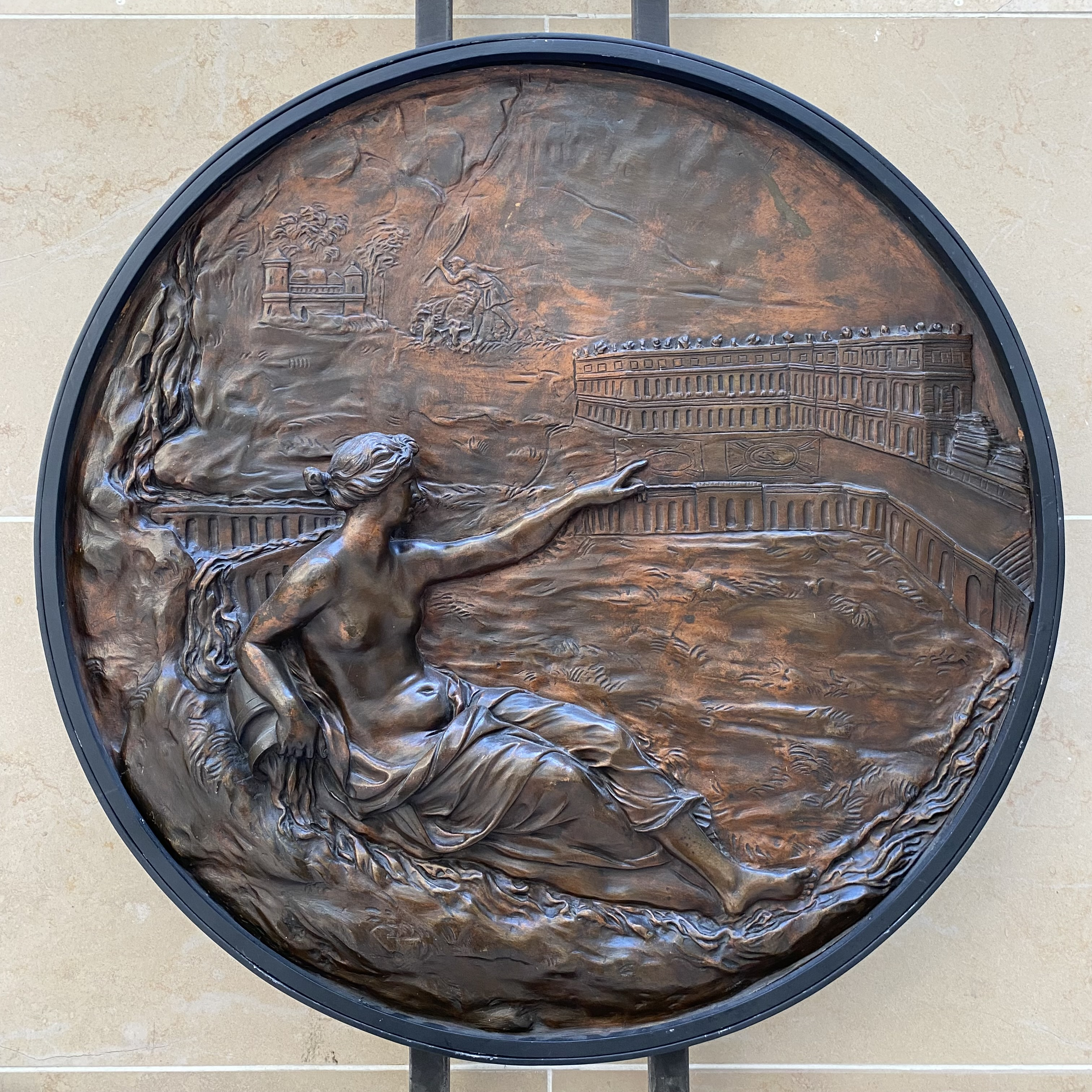
The Magnificent Buildings of Versailles, Louvre

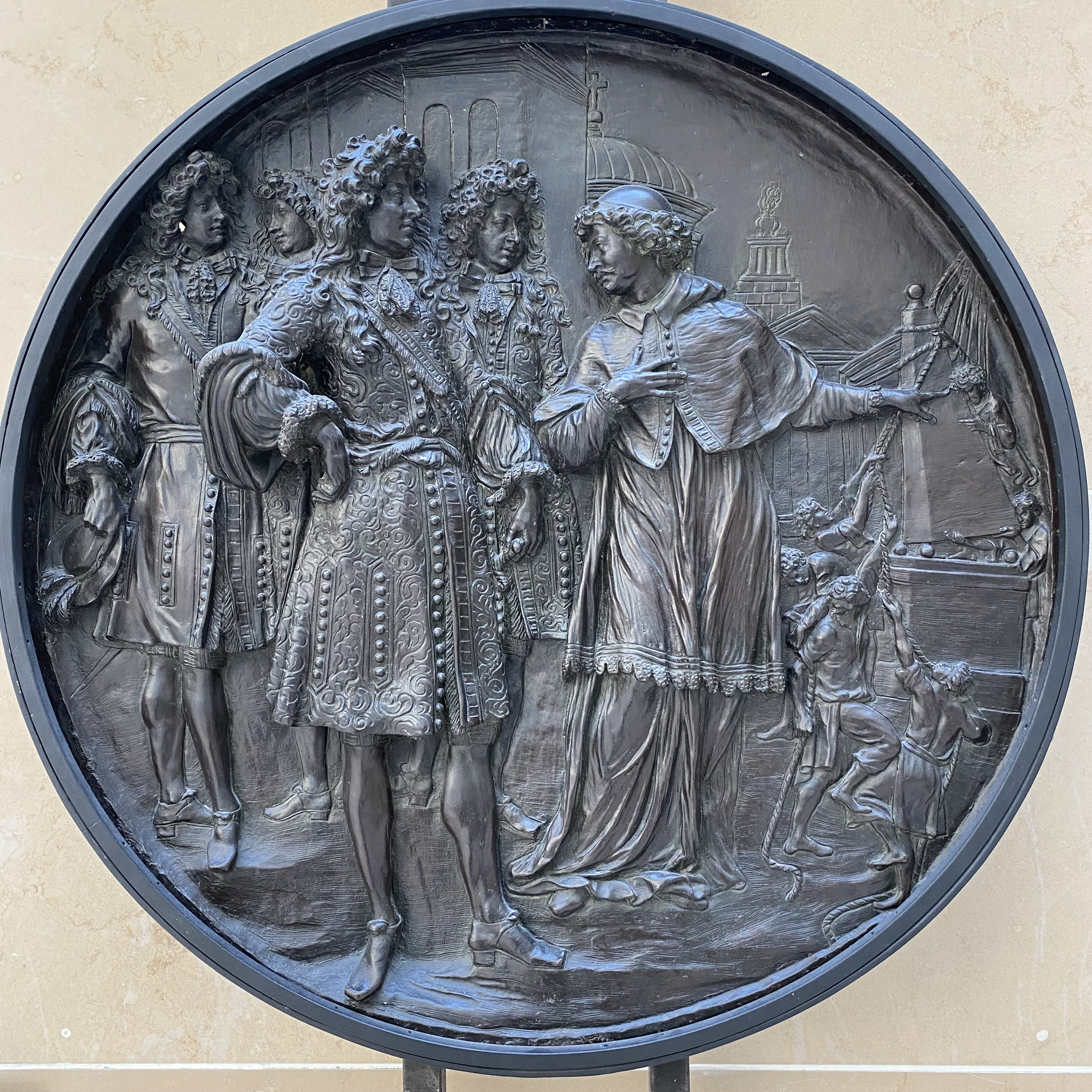
The Pyramid of the Corsican Guard, Erected then Demolished in Rome, Louvre

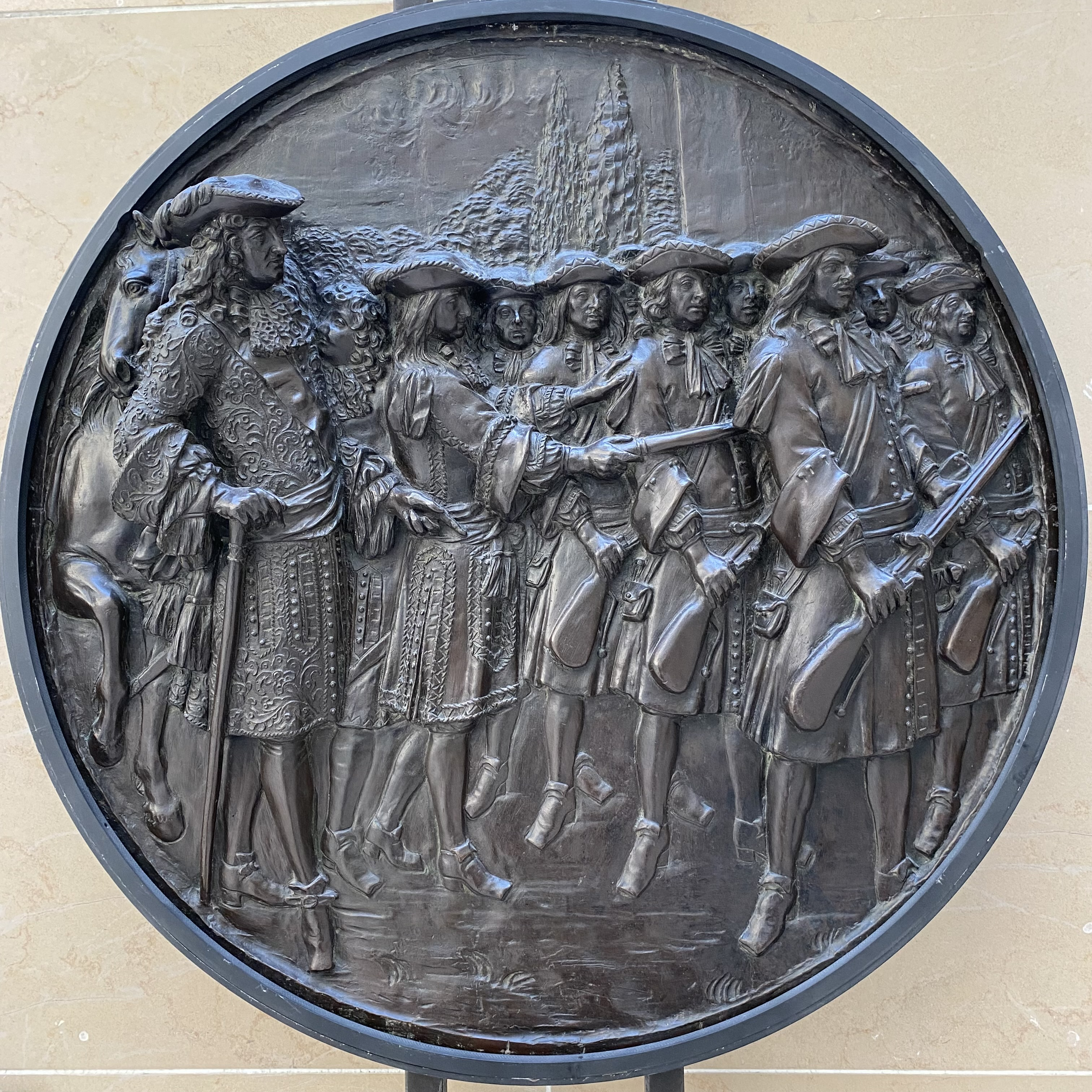
The Restoration of Military Discipline, Louvre

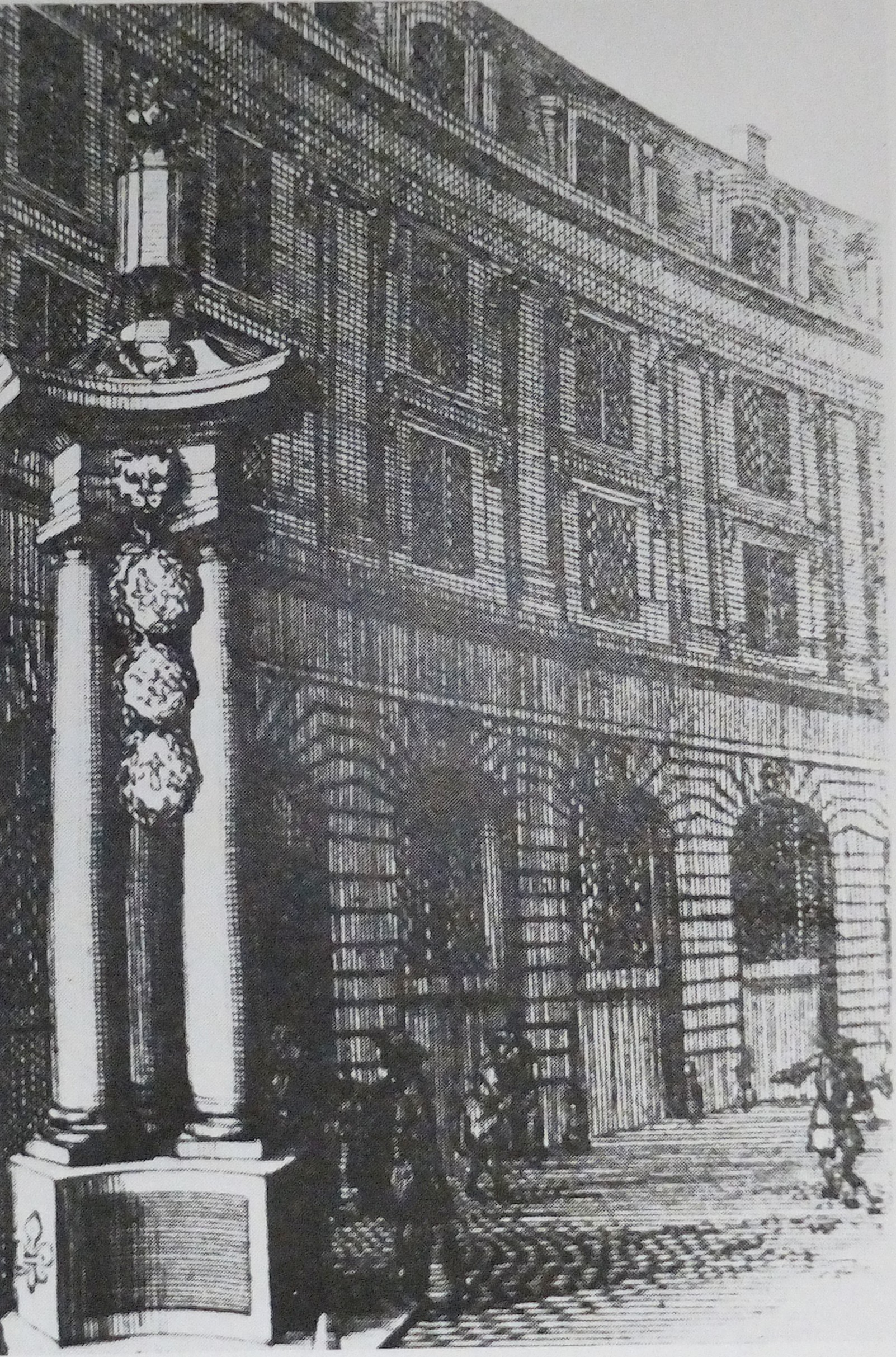
Engraving of one of the side lanterns, by Nicolas Guérard (1686)

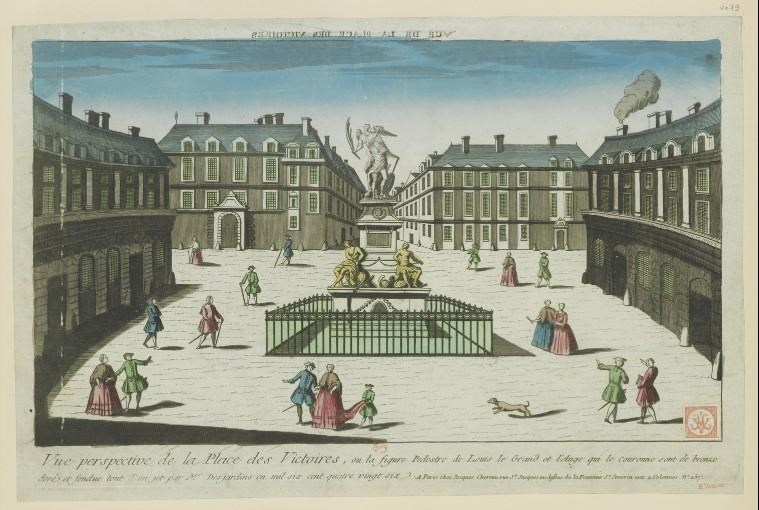
The square and monument, by Jacques Chereau (1775)

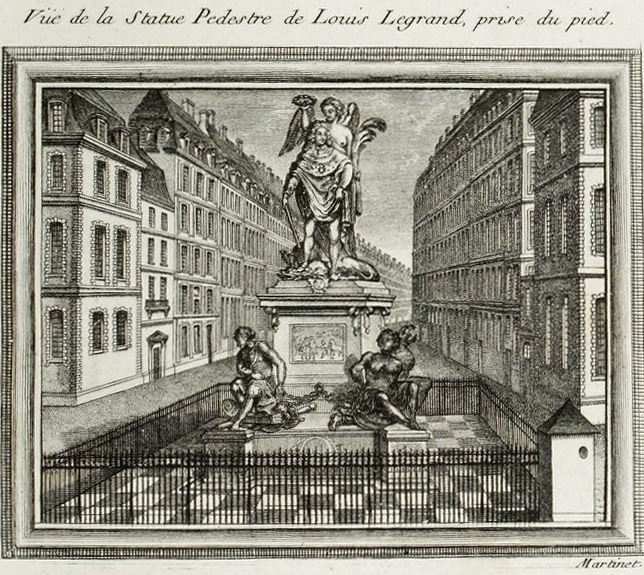
Engraving of the monument by François-Nicolas Martinet (1779)

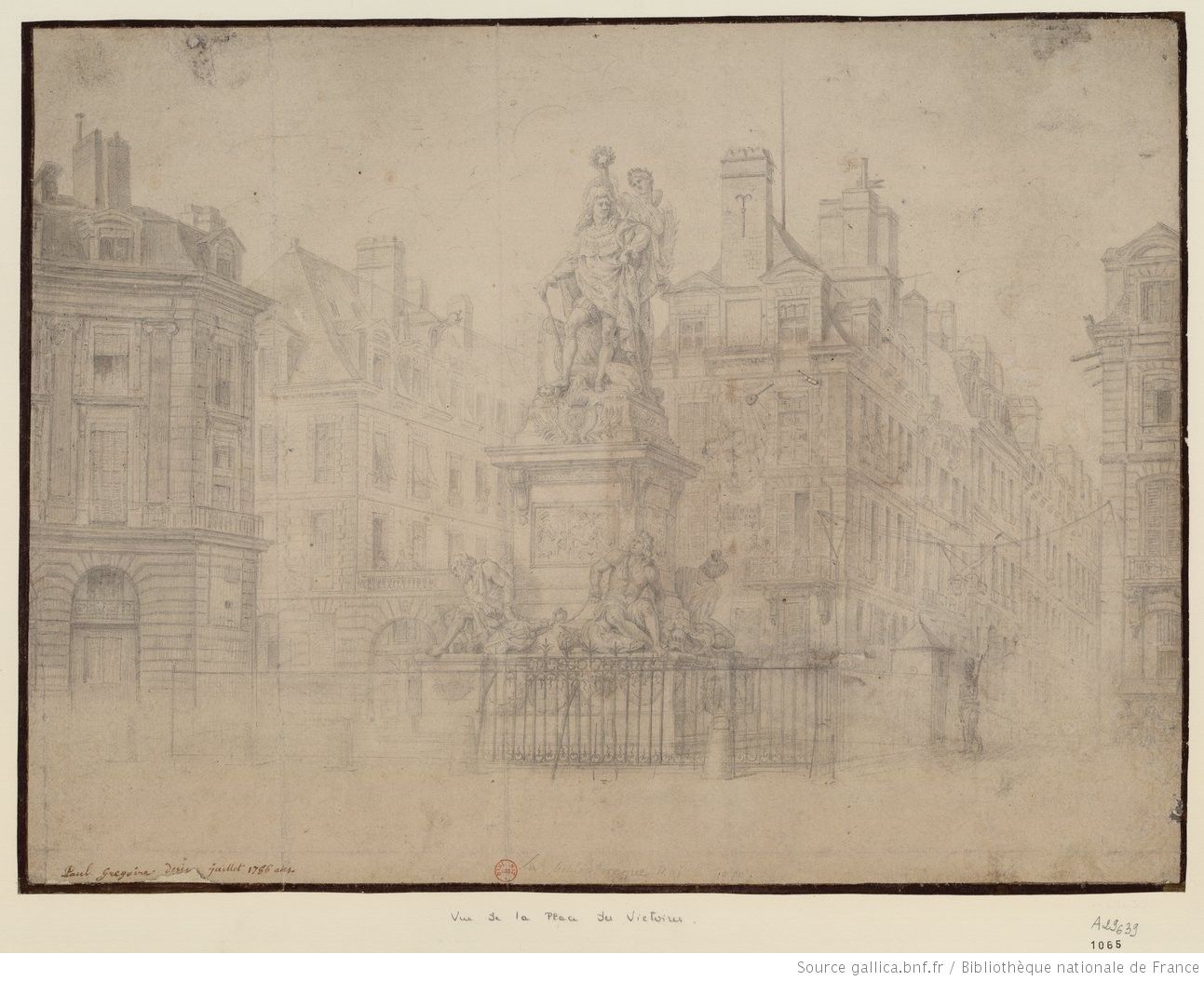
Drawing of the central statue by Paul Grégoire (1789)

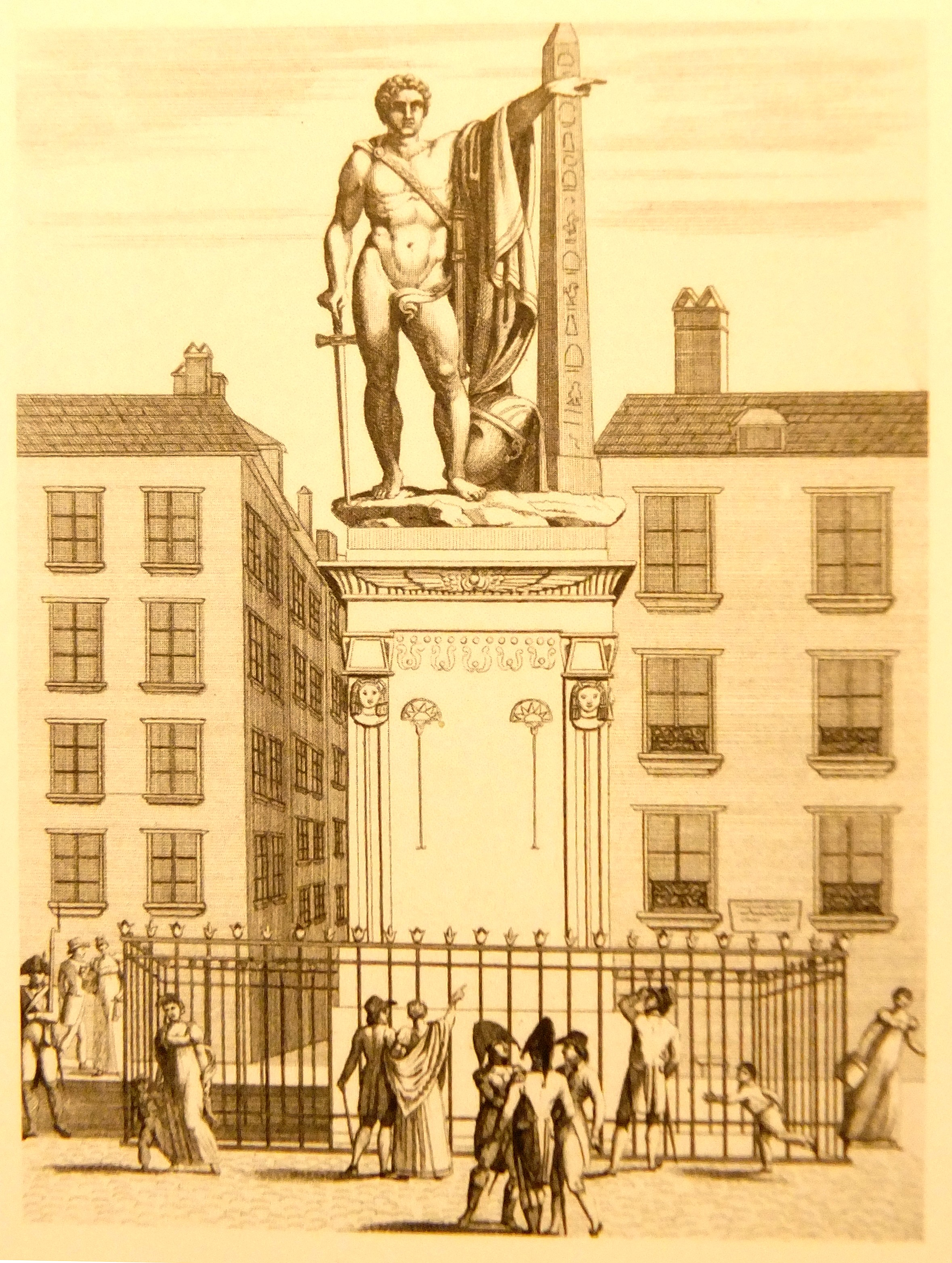
The statue of Desaix, anonymous engraving (1810)

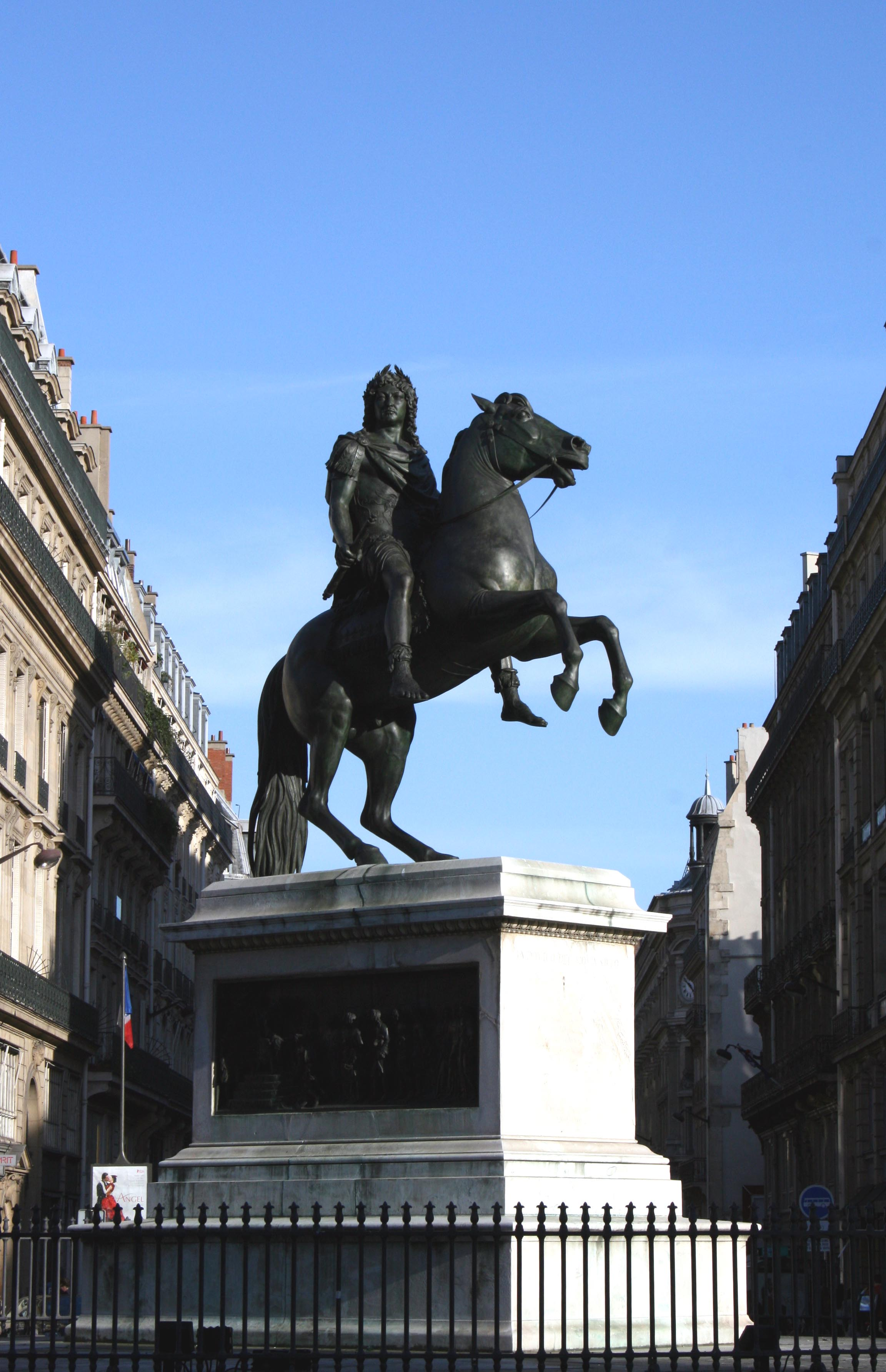
Bosio's equestrian statue of Louis XIV (1822, photographed in 2007)

== See also ==
- Monument of the Four Moors
- Equestrian statue of Louis XIV (Bernini)
- Plague Column, Vienna
