= Martin Desjardins =

French sculptor (1637–1694)

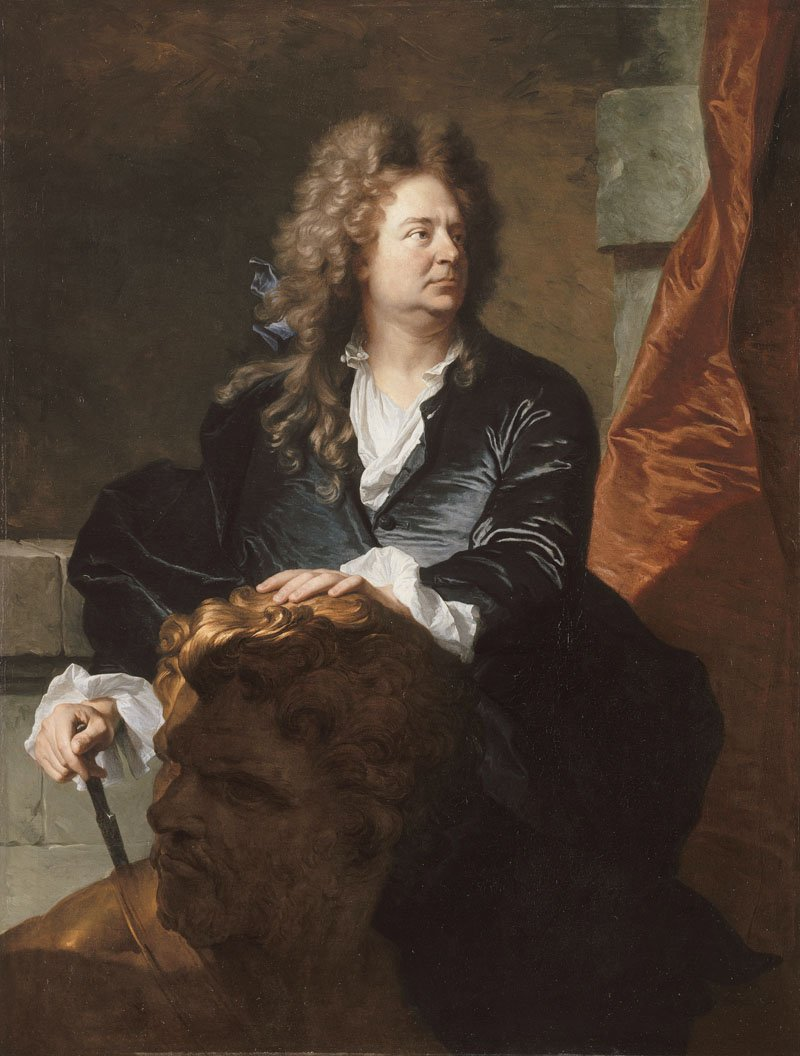
The portrait of Martin Desjardins was the reception piece for Hyacinthe Rigaud to the Académie royale, 1692

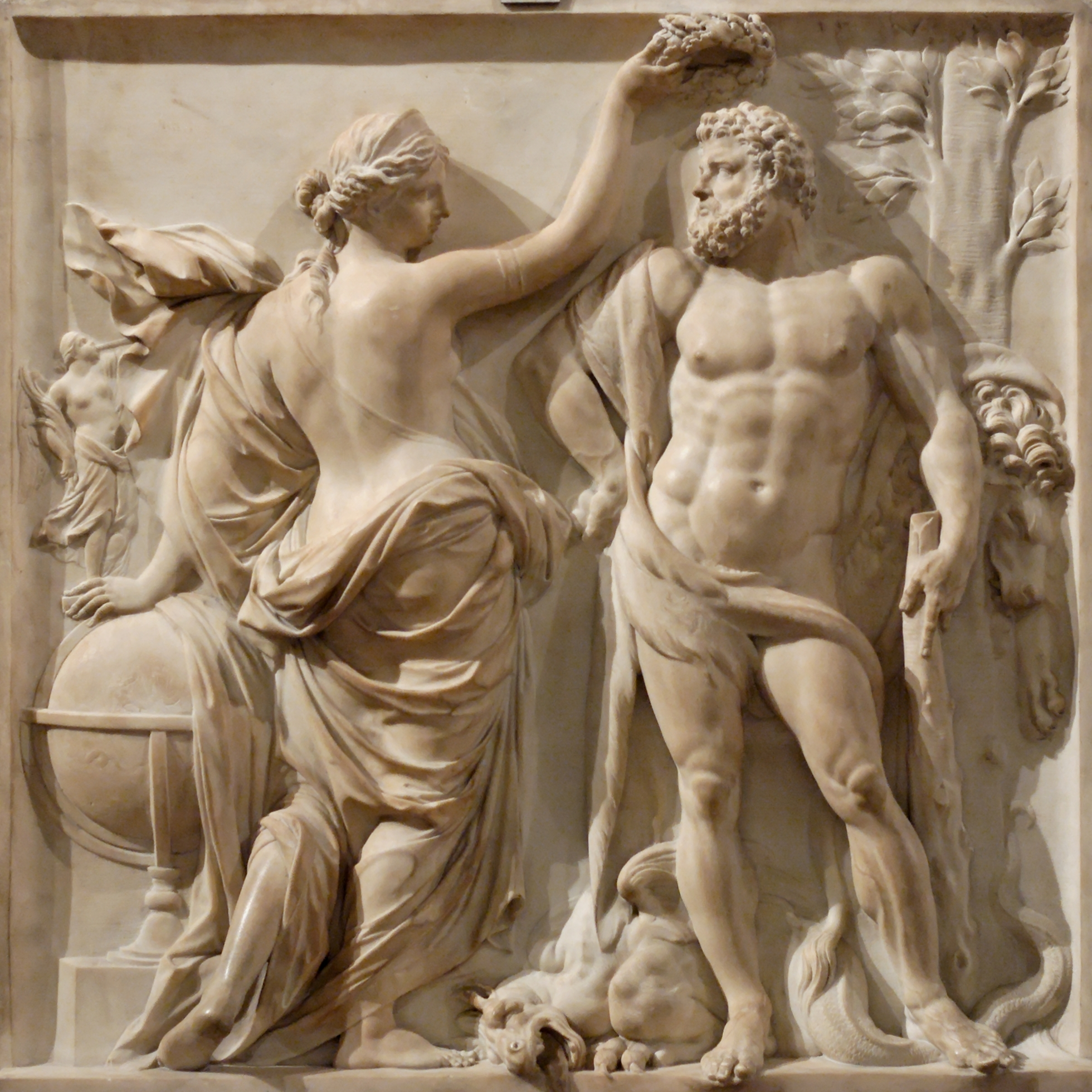
Hercules Crowned, 1671, was Martin Desjardins' reception piece at the Académie

Martin Desjardins, born Martin van den Bogaert (1637 – 2 May 1694) was a French sculptor and stuccoist of Dutch birth.

He was born at Breda, the son of a milliner in a house that would later carry the name 'de Drye Bredasche Hoeden' ("the Three Hats from Breda"). His early training was at Antwerp with the sculptor Pieter Verbruggen (1615–1686), while his mature career was spent at Paris, where he was working from the 1650s. His early Paris work was in decorative stucco reliefs, at the Hôtel d’Aubert de Fontenay (Hôtel Salé) and the Hôtel de Beauvais (staircase). He was accepted in 1661 into the Académie de Saint-Luc as "Martin Desjardins" (a translation of his Dutch name "of the orchard"), and gained a reputation executing private commissions for funerary monuments. In 1671 he was received as a member of the Académie royale de peinture et de sculpture on the basis of a marble relief of Hercules Crowned by Glory (Musée du Louvre).

From this time he received royal commissions, at Les Invalides and at Versailles, where iconographic treatment and design were tightly controlled and the sculptor was often presented with a sketch or working drawing to follow. His free copy of the king's Roman Diana, the Diana of Versailles, was repeated in his workshop several times. His monument to Louis XIV's victories on the Place des Victoires in Paris included bronze representations of Four Captive Nations (1682–85), celebrating the early victories of the armies of Louis XIV over the alliances of Spain, the Holy Roman Empire, Brandenburg and the Dutch Republic. They ornamented the socle of Desjardins' standing sculpture of Louis XIV, which was melted down at the Revolution. Today the Captifs are conserved in the Louvre, their gilding weathered away. A marble workshop copy of the Louis XIV is to be seen in the Orangerie at Versailles.

Similarly his equestrian statue Louis XIV erected in 1713 in Place Bellecour, Lyon was destroyed by the revolutionaries; however the bronze figures from its socle, the river gods of the Rhône and the Saône, which flow together at Lyon, were spared and are conserved in the Hôtel de Ville, Lyon. A commission for a third equestrian monument, for Aix-en-Provence, came to nothing; when the Swedish architect Nicodemus Tessin the Younger visited Desjardins in 1687, the sculptor described to him the project he had had in mind, for the king on a rearing horse that would have been supported on its hind legs and tail.

His portrait bust of Pierre Mignard, premier peintre du Roi was a gift to the painter's daughter in the year following Mignard's death (Louvre). Grand baroque marble bust of the marquis de Villacerf is also at the Louvre.

After his death, in Paris, his nephew Jacques Desjardins continued the atelier, providing the cultural agents of the Swedish crown with plaster models that were the basis in the 1740s, of an equestrian monument of Karl XII of Sweden (Patricia Wengraf, see link).

== References, notes and sources ==
References and notes

Sources

- Souchal, François, 1977. French sculptors of the 17th and 18th centuries. The reign of Louis XIV. (Oxford).
