= Monument of the Four Moors =

Monument in Livorno, Italy

Coordinates: 43.5495°N 10.3048°E

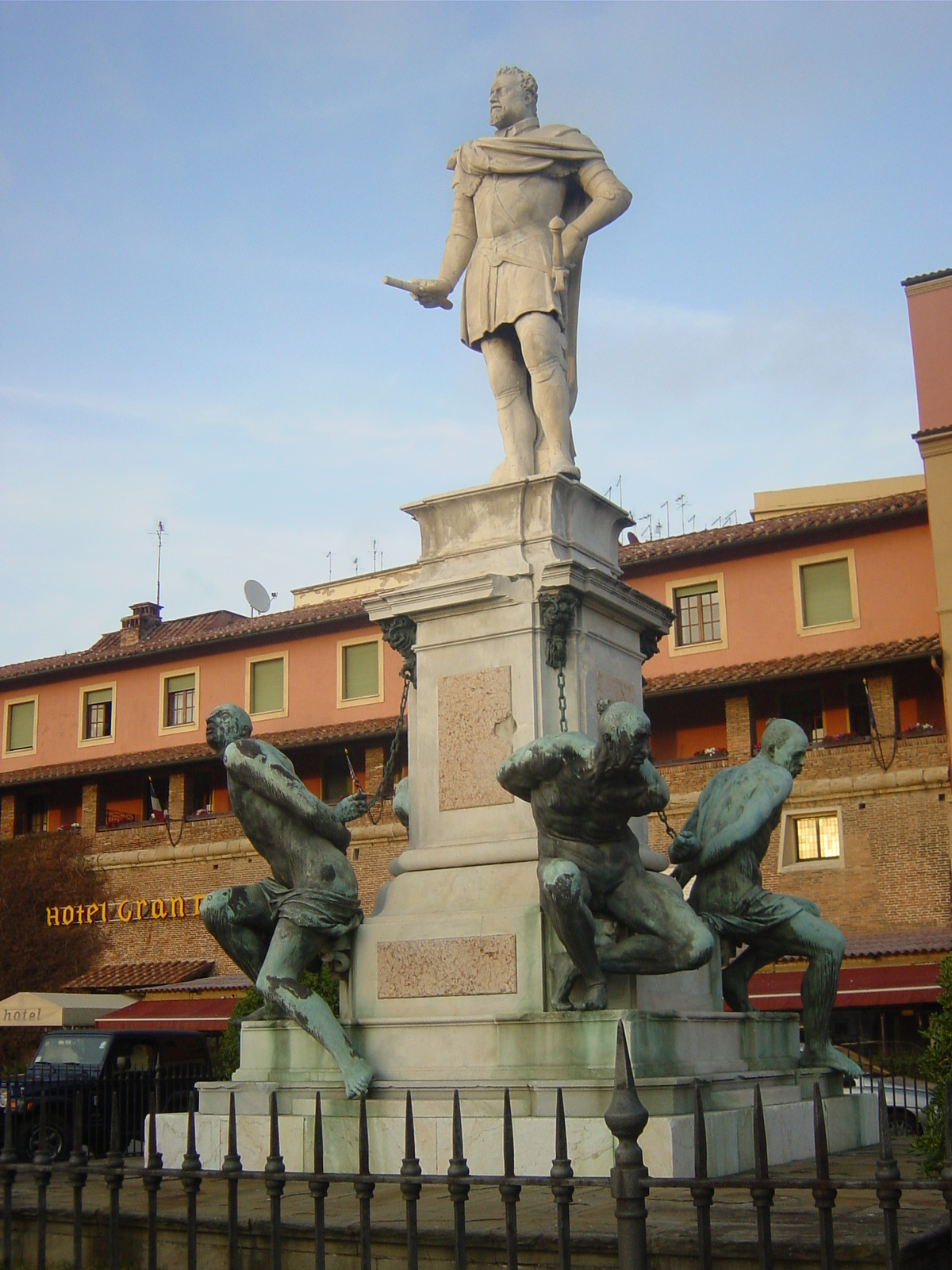
The Monument of the Four Moors

The Monument of the Four Moors (Italian: Monumento dei Quattro mori) is located in Livorno, Italy. It was completed in 1626 to commemorate the victories of Ferdinand I of Tuscany over the Ottomans.

It is the most famous monument of Livorno and is located in Piazza Micheli. Created by Pietro Tacca, the monument takes its name from the four bronze statues of "Moorish" slaves that are found at the base of an earlier work consisting of the statue of Ferdinando I and its monumental pedestal.

== History ==
In 1617, Cosimo II contracted sculptor Pietro Tacca to create the monument to commemorate his father, Ferdinando I. The completed monument was installed in Livorno in 1626. It features four bronze statues of enslaved prisoners chained at the base of a statue of Ferdinando I which had been commissioned at an earlier date. The physical characteristics of three of the statues represent people of the southern Mediterranean coast while the fourth statue has characteristics of a black African.

Although the four chained prisoners are meant to represent the victories of Ferdinando I over the Ottomans, some scholars have posited different interpretations due to the presence of the statue with the black African characteristics.

The four Moors symbolise the four corners of the world. Tacca's design of the Moors monument is assumed to have been influenced by three columns in the shape of African men supporting a balcony in Via Carriona in Carrara. The three sculptures are depicted as suffering from the weight they bear supporting the iron structure.

== Influence ==
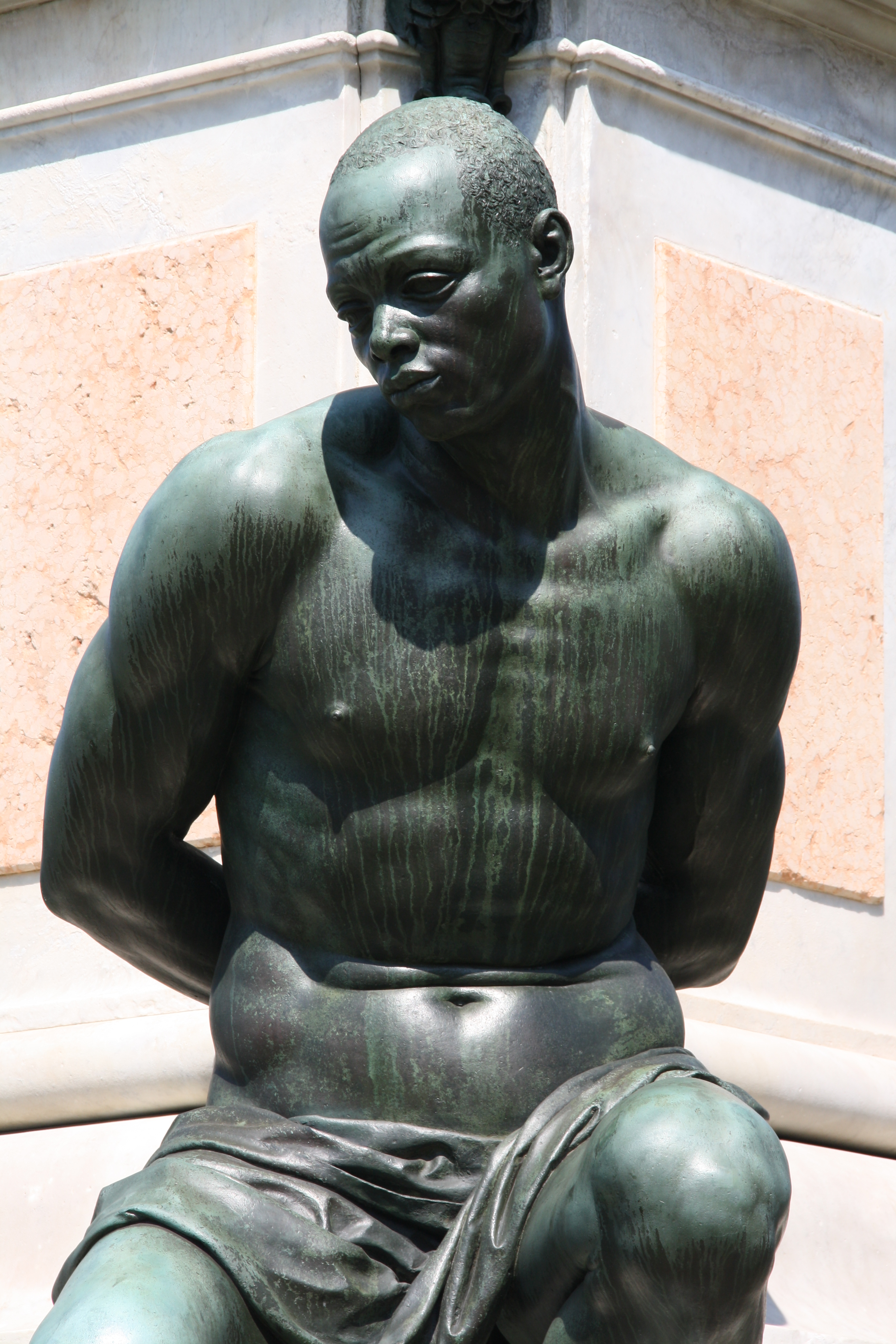
Detail of the monument showing the statue with black African characteristics

The monument of the four Moors influenced sculptural design for several decades. A fountain in Marino features four statues of similarly chained prisoners, two of whom possess black African characteristics. The structure was constructed between 1632–1642 to commemorate Marcantonio Colonna's participation in the battle of Lepanto in 1571 which led to the defeat of the Ottomans.

The monument of the four Moors also influenced Bernini's creation of the Fountain of the Four Rivers (Fontana dei Quattro Fiumi). Bernini may have also been influenced by the Marino monument in his design of the Fountain.

The ostentatious design of the tomb of Doge Giovanni Pesaro, which was built in 1669 in Venice, and is found in Santa Maria Gloriosa dei Frari close to the Pesaro Altarpiece, was perhaps strongly influenced by Tacca's monument of the four Moors.

== See also ==
- Louis XIV Victory Monument
