= 1600s (decade) =

Decade

The 1600s (pronounced "sixteen-hundreds") was a decade of the Gregorian calendar that began on 1 January 1600, and ended on 31 December 1609.

The term "sixteen-hundreds" could also mean the entire century from 1 January 1600 to 31 December 1699.

The decade was a period of significant political, scientific, and artistic advancement. European Colonies such as Virginia were established in the late 1600s. Galileo Galilei and Johannes Kepler made significant contributions to science and astronomy. The Polish-Swedish War saw the Battle of Kokenhausen in 1601, where Polish horsemen led by Krzysztof Radziwiłł defeated Swedish attackers under Carl Gyllenhielm.

== Events ==
=== 1600 ===
==== January–March ====
- January 1 – Scotland adopts January 1 as New Year's Day instead of March 25.
- January 20 – Hugh O'Neill, Earl of Tyrone, renews the Nine Years' War (Ireland) against England with an invasion of Munster.
- January 24 – Sebald de Weert makes the first recorded sighting of the Falkland Islands.
- February 17 – On his way to be burned at the stake for heresy in Rome, Giordano Bruno has his tongue "imprisoned" after he refuses to stop talking.
- February 19 – The Huaynaputina volcano in Peru erupts, in what is still the worst recorded volcanic eruption.
- March 20 – Linköping Bloodbath: Five Swedish nobles are publicly executed by decapitation and Polish–Swedish King Sigismund III Vasa is de facto deposed as ruler of Sweden.

==== April–June ====
- April 19 – The first Dutch ship ever to arrive in Japan, the Liefde ("Love"), anchors in Sashifu, in the Bungo Province (modern-day Usuki in Ōita Prefecture). The sailors present on this ship are William Adams, Jan Joosten van Lodensteijn, Jacob Quaeckernaeck and Melchior van Santvoort.
- May 27 – Michael the Brave becomes ruler of Wallachia, Transylvania and Moldavia, formally uniting the three Danubian Principalities under one Romanian ruler.
- June 5 – Robert Devereux, 2nd Earl of Essex, the former Lord Lieutenant of Ireland and Chancellor of the University of Dublin, is put on trial in England before a commission of 18 men, after being charged with malfeasance. He is deprived of his main business, a monopoly on sweet wines, and stripped of his noble title. In revenge, he attempts to organize a coup d'etat to overthrow Queen Elizabeth and fails in his plot.
- June 9 – Yi Hang-bok becomes the new Chief State Councillor of Korea (the Yeonguijeong), equivalent to a prime minister, after being appointed by King Seonjo to replace Yi San-hae.
- June 13 – Barrister Nicholas Fuller is granted the exclusive right in England to manufacture playing cards.
- June 25 – In England, a fire destroys much of the town of North Walsham, Norfolk, burning down 118 homes, 70 shops, and most of the stalls in the market square. The fire is traced to the home of one person who tries to flee town after the blaze begins. Many of the persons left homeless are given shelter at the St Nicholas Church.

==== July–September ====
- July 2 – Eighty Years' War (Dutch War of Independence) – Battle of Nieuwpoort: The Dutch Republic gains a tactical victory over the Spanish Empire.
- August 5 – The brothers Alexander Ruthven and John Ruthven, 3rd Earl of Gowrie, are killed during a failed attempt to kidnap or murder King James VI of Scotland at their home.
- September 18 – The Battle of Mirăslău takes place within Transylvania as Hungarian troops, backed by the Holy Roman Empire, triumph over the Principality of Wallachia, backed by Poland. Hungarian General Giorgio Basta brings 30,000 men against the 22,000 commanded by Wallachia's ruler Michael the Brave. The Wallachians sustain more than 5,000 dead and wounded.
- September 24 – All 130 crew of the Dutch Republic ship Hoop die when the merchantman sinks in a storm while traveling in the Pacific Ocean between the Hawaiian Islands and Japan. The Liefde, a ship accompanying Hoop, is badly damaged but survives; all but 24 of its crew of more than 100 die from starvation and thirst after drifting more than six months before arriving in Japan on April 19, 1601.

==== October–December ====
- October 6 – The première of Jacopo Peri's Euridice, the earliest known fully surviving work of modern opera, takes place in Florence for the wedding of Henry IV of France and Marie de' Medici. Emilio de' Cavalieri stages the production.
- October 8 – The basic legal system for the Republic of San Marino goes into effect during the service of captains regent Girolamo Gozi and Francesco Giannini.
- October 20 – Persian diplomats, led by Husayn 'Ali Beg of Persia, and Englishman Anthony Shirley (who serves as translator) arrive in Prague to meet with Rudolf II, Holy Roman Emperor.
- October 21 – The Battle of Sekigahara occurs in what is now present-day Gifu Prefecture, Japan, where the Eastern Army led by Tokugawa Ieyasu emerges victorious against the Western Army led by Ishida Mitsunari. The battle ends the Sengoku period and grants the Tokugawa clan nominal control over Japan, establishing the Tokugawa shogunate with Tokugawa Ieyasu as shogun.
- November 7 – Emperor Rudolf II grants an audience in Prague to Persian diplomats Husayn 'Ali Beg and Anthony Shirley, and present the offer of Persia's King Abbas the Great to supply weapons to the Empire in their fight against the Ottomans.
- November 15 – Thessaly rebellion: Greek farmers in Thessaly, incited by Bishop Dionysios Skylosophos, begin an uprising against the Ottoman Empire, with violence in an area bounded by Trikala and Karditsa and the surrounding mountains, but the rebellion is suppressed by the Ottomans in a few days.
- December 31 – The East India Company is granted a Royal charter in the Kingdom of England for trade with Asia.

==== Date unknown ====
- Approximate date – The Lutheran orthodox campaign intensifies, to reinforce the Book of Concord.
- Caister Castle in England falls into ruin.
- Sumo wrestling becomes a professional sport in Japan.
- William Shakespeare's plays Henry IV, Part 2, Henry V, The Merchant of Venice, A Midsummer Night's Dream and Much Ado About Nothing are published in London.
- William Gilbert publishes De Magnete, one of the first significant scientific books published in England, describing the Earth's magnetic field, and the beginning of modern geomagnetism.
- Fabritio Caroso's dance manual Nobiltà de dame is published.

=== 1601 ===
==== January–March ====
- January 11 – Valladolid is briefly the capital of Habsburg Spain under Philip III, before returning indefinitely to Madrid in 1606.
- January 17 – Treaty of Lyon: France gains Bresse, Bugey and Gex from Savoy, ceding Saluzzo in exchange.
- February 8 – Robert Devereux, 2nd Earl of Essex, longtime favourite of Queen Elizabeth I of England, begins a rebellion against the Queen. The revolt is crushed the next day. The Earl of Essex and Henry Wriothesley, 3rd Earl of Southampton are arrested and charged with treason. Essex confesses to the plot and then implicates his co-conspirators.
- February 23 – Michael the Brave, Prince of Wallachia, arrives in Prague to enlist the assistance of Rudolf II, Holy Roman Emperor in driving Ottoman troops out of Transylvania. Michael leaves on March 5, having received a pledge of Austrian troops to the fight.
- February 25 – The Earl of Essex becomes the first of the Essex's Rebellion participants to be executed. He is beheaded at Tower Hill. His co-conspirator, the Earl of Southampton, sentenced to death, but Queen Elizabeth commutes his penalty to life imprisonment; Southampton will be released two years later.
- March 5 – The treason trial for five secondary participants in Essex's Rebellion — Gelli Meyrick, Henry Cuffe, Christopher Blount, Charles Danvers, and Sir John Davies — is held in London. All five are found guilty. Meyrick and Cuffe are hanged at Tyburn on March 13, and Blount and Danvers are beheaded at Tower Hill on March 18. Davies is allowed to go free.
- March 7 – In India, Mughal Empire Prince Daniyal Mirza, son of the Emperor Akbar, is named the ruler of Khandesh, after having completed the conquest of the sultanate of Ahmednagar.
- March 24 – Sigismund Báthory, who had abdicated as Prince of Transylvania in 1599, returns as the leader of the invading Polish Army.

==== April–June ====
- April 3 – At an assembly of nobles at Kolozsvár (now Cluj-Napoca in Romania), Sigismund Báthory is again proclaimed Prince of Transylvania.
- April 22 – The first expedition of the East India Company sets sail from England for the Spice Islands with John Davis as pilot-major.
- May 5 – Dutch explorer Joris van Spilbergen, leading three ships of the Compagnie van De Moucheron, departs on his first expedition to Asia, departing from Veere with the ships Ram, Schaap, and Lam (Ram, Sheep and Lamb). After establishing trade in Sri Lanka, Spilbergen and his crew return to the Dutch Republic in 1604.
- May 28 – Sekigahara Campaign: Japanese warlord Date Masamune leads an unsuccessful attempt to take Fukushima Castle.
- June 23
  - Polish–Swedish War (1600–1611): The Battle of Kokenhausen is fought at Koknese in Livonia (now Latvia) after Swedish troops had invaded the Lithuanian territory). The Polish hussars, commanded by Prince Krzysztof Radziwill, overwhelm a numerically superior force of Swedish attackers led by General Carl Gyllenhielm, and over 2,000 Swedish soldiers are killed.
  - Juan de Oñate, the Spanish colonial administrator in what is now the U.S. state of New Mexico, departs from San Gabriel de Nuevo Mexico with 130 Spanish soldiers and 12 priests on an expedition to explore the interior of the area.

==== July–September ====
- July 2 – The Spanish expedition of Juan de Oñate reaches the Canadian River on (the feast day of Biblical Mary Magdalena), in what is now Texas.
- July 5 – The Siege of Ostend, which will last more than three years and claims more than 100,000 casualties for both Spain and the Netherlands, begins as Albert of Austria, Governor General of the Habsburg Netherlands, leads an attack on the Dutch Netherlands fortress at Ostend. The Spanish forces eventually triumph on September 20, 1604, albeit in a Pyrrhic victory that will see at least 60,000 soldiers killed, wounded, or dead from disease.
- July 22 – General Yemişçi Hasan Pasha is selected as the new Grand Vizier of the Ottoman Empire by Sultan Mehmed III, 12 days after the death of Grand Vizier Damat Ibrahim Pasha. He served for only 15 months before being executed on the Sultan's orders on October 4, 1603.
- August 2 – The Oñate expedition reaches the Rita Blanco River on the day of the Feast of the Porciuncula and follows it northward into Oklahoma.
- August 3 – The Battle of Guruslău takes place in Goroszlo in (now Guruslău in Romania), as Wallachian troops led by Michael the Brave and Giorgio Basta defeat Transylvanian defenders commanded by Sigismund Báthory. Wallachia, assisted by Austrian troops from the Holy Roman Empire, retakes the Principality of Transylvania from Ottoman rule.
- September 2 – 4th Spanish Armada is sent; a fleet of 33 ships and 4,432 men, under the command of Admiral Juan del Águila, departs Portugal after being dispatched to Ireland by King Philip III. The Spanish fleet is intended to support an Irish rebellion led by Hugh O'Neill, Earl of Tyrone and Hugh Roe O'Donnell against the British.
- September 6 – Pope Clement VIII issues a decree forbidding the publication of any litany, except that of the saints as found in the liturgical books and the Litany of Loreto.
- September 9 – The siege of Nagykanizsa, an Ottoman fortress in Hungary, is started by Archduke Ferdinand of Austria and lasts for more than two months before being abandoned.
- September 11 – Queen Elizabeth I summons her 10th, and last, meeting of the English Parliament.
- September 19 – The Juan de Oñate expedition of Spanish explorers first encounters the indigenous Escanjaque Indians in what is now the U.S. state of Kansas. The Escanjaques ask the Spaniards to assist them in a war against a rival tribe, the Rayados. Instead, Oñate befriends the Rayados five days later.
- September 20 – The siege of Székesfehérvár, an Ottoman occupied Hungarian fortress, is completed by troops of the Holy Roman Empire after 16 days. The Ottomans will recapture Székesfehérvár a year later.
- September 28 – The Escanjaque Indians attack Juan de Oñate's Spanish expedition as the Spaniards are returning from their furthest venture east, the Little Arkansas River.

==== October–December ====
- October 2 (September 22 O.S.) – 4th Spanish Armada; a large Spanish fleet, with 4,500 soldiers led by Juan del Águila, lands at Kinsale at County Cork in Ireland, to assist Tyrone's Rebellion.
- October 4 – Claudine de Culam, a 16-year-old girl in the French village of Rognon, is hanged after being convicted of "carnal cohabitation with a dog". The dog is hanged along with her.
- October 26 – Johannes Kepler, assistant to Tycho Brahe, is suddenly promoted to the position of Royal Mathematician of the Holy Roman Empire after Brahe's sudden death.
- October 27 – The 10th Parliament of Elizabeth I is opened by Queen Elizabeth of England. It serves until December 19.
- November 4 – Cyril I is selected as the new leader of the Eastern Orthodox Church as Patriarch of Constantinople and Greek Patriarch of Alexandria, succeeding Meletius I Pegas, who died on September 12.
- November 18 – Ottoman defenders commanded by Tiryaki Hasan Pasha successfully resist the Austrian siege of Nagykanizsa.
- December 6 – The Battle of Castlehaven is fought off of the coast of southern Ireland as six Spanish Navy ships led by General Pedro de Zubiaur are intercepted by an English fleet of four warships led and commanded by Sir Richard Levenson. Two of the Spanish ships are sunk, and the other four are run aground.
- December 19 – The 10th Parliament of Elizabeth I is adjourned. Another English Parliament will not be assembled until 1604 when summoned by James I.
- December 24 (Julian calendar, used by the English; January 3, 1602, according to the Gregorian calendar used by the Irish and Spanish forces in the battle) – The Battle of Kinsale ends the siege of Kinsale, Ireland (begun in autumn 1601).
- December 27 – The Battle of Bantam is fought within what is now Indonesia off of the coast of the island of Java, as Walter Harmensz leads five Dutch Republic galleons in a successful attack against a Portuguese fleet led by André Furtado de Mendonça.

==== Date unknown ====
- Dutch troops attack the Portuguese in Malacca.
- Jesuit Matteo Ricci becomes the first European to enter the Forbidden City in Beijing, China, being invited by the Ming Dynasty Emperor.
- A rainy summer in the Tsardom of Russia causes a bad harvest, leading to the Russian famine of 1601–03 which kills about two million people.
- Martin Möller is accused of Crypto-Calvinism.

=== 1602 ===
==== January–March ====
- January 3 – Battle of Kinsale: The English defeat Irish rebels and their Spanish allies. (The battle happens on this date according to the Gregorian calendar used by the Irish and Spanish but on Thursday, 24 December, 1601 according to the old Julian calendar used by the English.)
- February 2 (Candlemas night) – In London, the first known production of William Shakespeare's comedy Twelfth Night takes place.
- March 20 – The United East India Company is established by the United Provinces States-General in Amsterdam, with the stated intention of capturing the spice trade from the Portuguese.

==== April–June ====
- April 20 – The Danish–Icelandic Trade Monopoly is established.
- May 25 (May 15 Old Style) – English explorer Bartholomew Gosnold, sailing in the Concord, becomes the first European at Cape Cod.
- June 2 – Dutch explorer Joris van Spilbergen lands on the eastern side of the island of Sri Lanka, at Santhamuruthu, and begins the process of attempting to establish a relationship with the rulers of the Kingdom of Kandy.
- June 3 – Anglo-Spanish War (1585) – Battle of Sesimbra Bay off of the coast of Portugal: Five galleons of the English Royal Navy defeat a larger force of Spanish Navy ships.
- June 5 – James Lancaster's East India Company fleet arrives at Achin (modern-day Aceh), Sumatra to deal with the local ruler. Having defeated Portugal's ally, the ruler is happy to do business, and Lancaster seizes a large Portuguese galleon and loots it.
- June 17 – An expedition of 14 Dutch Republic ships, commanded by Admiral Wybrand van Warwijck, departs from Texel on its expedition to the East Indies.
- June 18 – Nine Years' War (Ireland): Dunboy Castle in Ireland is taken by the English after 143 Irish defenders had withstood an 11-day siege by more than 4,000 English soldiers under the command of Sir George Carew. Of the 143 soldiers, who had been loyal to Donal Cam O'Sullivan Beare, 85 are killed in the siege, and the 58 survivors are hanged after the English victory.

==== July–September ====
- July 7 – The German duchy of Saxe-Altenburg, with a capital at Altenburg, is created as a separate duchy as a gift to Johann Philipp, the eldest son of his father Johann II, Duke of Saxe-Weimar.
- July 26 – William Shakespeare's tragedy Hamlet, recently premiered by the Lord Chamberlain's Men, is licensed for publishing in London but not in fact printed at this time.
- July 29 – Juan de Zúñiga Flores, Bishop of Cartagena, becomes the Grand Inquisitor of Spain but serves for only five months before his death at the age of 55.
- August 22 – Abu'l-Fazl ibn Mubarak, the prime minister for India's Mughal Emperor Akbar, is assassinated at Narwar as part of a plot by Emperor Akbar's son, Prince Salim, who will later succeed Akbar as Emperor Jahangir. Abu'l-Fazl's killer, Vir Singh Bundela, sends the victim's severed head to Prince Salim as proof of the plot's success.
- September 1 – The Mutiny of Hoogstraten, a rebellion by soldiers of the Army of Flanders, begins with the seizure by 3,000 disgruntled mercenaries of the town of Hoogstraten (now in Belgium). The mutineers hold the town for almost two years before surrendering on 18 May 1604.
- September 10 – Rory O'Donnell (Rudhraighe Ó Domhnaill) becomes the last Irish King of Tyrconnell upon the death of his brother, Hugh Roe O'Donnell (Aodh Ruadh Ó Domhnaill). After less than a year, Rory allows Tyrconnell (modern-day County Donegal in Northern Ireland) to come under Irish control in return for being created the Earl of Tyrconnell.
- September 12 – King Sigismund III Vasa of Poland receives the delivery of eight specially woven Persian carpets displaying Poland's royal coat of arms, after having dispatched agent Sefer Muratowicz to Kashan.
- September 20 – The siege of the Spanish Netherlands town of De Graaf ends after two months as a Dutch and English army forces the surrender of the Spanish defenders.
- September 30 – The siege of Weissenstein, a Swedish town that is now Paide in Estonia, ends after four months with a victory of 2,000 Polish and Lithuanian troops commanded by Jan Zamoyski, the Great Crown Hetman of the Polish–Lithuanian Commonwealth.

==== October–December ====
- October 3 – Battle of the Narrow Seas: An English fleet, joined by the Dutch, begins a pursuit of six Spanish galleys through the Strait of Dover, and defeats them the next day.
- November 8 – The Bodleian Library at the University of Oxford in England is opened.
- December 11 – A surprise attack by forces under the command of Charles Emmanuel I, Duke of Savoy, and his brother-in-law, Philip III of Spain, is repelled by the citizens of Geneva (this actually takes place after midnight, in the early morning of December 12, but commemorations/celebrations on Fête de l'Escalade are usually held on December 11 or the closest weekend).

==== Ongoing ====
- Russian famine of 1601–03
- Long Turkish War (1591/1593-1606)
- Jelali revolts

==== Date unknown ====
- The Portuguese are expelled from Bahrain.
- The Safavid Empire of Persia and the Spanish Empire conclude a defensive alliance and declare war on the Ottoman Empire.
- First publication, in London, of:
  - Ben Jonson's satirical comedy Poetaster.
  - William Shakespeare's comedy The Merry Wives of Windsor.
  - The play A Larum for London, or the Siedge of Antwerp.
- Copies are printed of the geographical map of East Asia created by Matteo Ricci, an Italian Jesuit stationed in Ming dynasty Beijing, China, with Chinese-written labeling and map symbols.
- The iconoclast and Confucian scholar Li Zhi commits suicide while in a Chinese prison, during the late Ming dynasty; he had taught that women were the intellectual equals of men and should be given equal opportunity in education; he was charged with spreading "dangerous ideas".

=== 1603 ===
==== January–March ====
- January 24 – Anglo-Spanish War: English Admiral Christopher Newport leads an unsuccessful attempt to take the Spanish-controlled Caribbean island of Jamaica, where he was attempting to pillage the area to obtain supplies. The Spanish defenders repel the fleet, and Newport leads the attackers to the coast of Central America.
- February 17 – Anglo-Spanish War: The Battle of Puerto Caballos is fought off of the coast of Guatemala by two Spanish Navy galleons, and eight English Navy and French pirate ships. The English-French soldiers and pirates, commanded by Christopher Newport and Michael Geare, plunder Puerto Caballos over the next two weeks, and the Spanish defenders suffer 230 casualties.
- February 25 – Dutch–Portuguese War: the Portuguese ship Santa Catarina is seized by Dutch East India Company ships off Singapore.
- March 15 – French explorer Samuel de Champlain departs from the Channel port of Honfleur in the Calvados département in the Kingdom of France for his first voyage to the settlement of New France in what is now Canada.
- March 24
  - Queen Elizabeth I of England dies at Richmond Palace (having ruled since 1558). She is succeeded by her first cousin twice removed, King James VI of Scotland (where he has ruled since 1567), uniting the crowns of Scotland and England.
  - Tokugawa Ieyasu is granted the title of shōgun from Emperor Go-Yozei, and establishes the Tokugawa shogunate in Edo, Japan. The 265-year-long Edo period begins.
- March 30 – The Nine Years War (Ireland) is ended by the submission of Hugh O'Neill, Earl of Tyrone, to the English Crown, and the signing of the Treaty of Mellifont.

==== April–June ====
- April 27 – The first permanent Dutch trading post in Indonesia is established in Banten by Vice Admiral Wybrand van Warwijck, who sets up a factory to store and package the trading commodity black pepper.
- April 28 – The funeral of Elizabeth I of England is held in Westminster Abbey.
- May 8 – Mozes Székely is installed as the Prince of Transylvania by the Ottoman Sultan, Mehmed III. Székely is killed in battle on July 17.
- May 13 – In modern-day northern Thailand, the rulers of Chiang Mai retake control of the Nan province and capture its ruler, Cao Cetabut.
- May 14 – Pope Gabriel VIII of Alexandria, leader of the Coptic Christian Church, dies after a reign of almost 16 years. He is succeeded by Pope Mark V.
- May 19 – The King's Men, a troupe of English professional actors composed primarily of former members of the Lord Chamberlain's Men, is granted its royal patent by King James. The company will give the first performances of many of the plays of William Shakespeare, who is one of the company's 26 principal actors. Named in order of priority on the patent are manager Lawrence Fletcher, Shakespeare, and Richard Burbage.
- May 26 – The Battle of Sluis is fought at sea off of the Belgian Netherlands as Spanish ships try unsuccessfully to break through a blockade port of the port of Sluis. The Spanish ships are forced to return to port after at least 414 sailors are killed.
- May 29 – A tabagie feast is held in Tadoussac in the modern-day Canadian province of Quebec, as representatives of France (Samuel De Champlain and François Gravé Du Pont, form an alliance with representatives of the Innu, Algonquin and Maliseet tribes.
- June 7 – Prince Şehzade Mahmud of the Ottoman Empire, the 16-year-old son of Sultan Murad III, is executed on orders of his father, on advice of the Grand Vizier, after being accused unjustly of an assassination plot.

==== July–September ====
- July 17 – Sir Walter Raleigh is arrested in England on charges of treason and of conspiring with Lord Cobham in the "Main Plot" to overthrow King James for replacement by Lady Arbella Stuart.
- July 25 – The formal coronation of James I as King of England takes place at Westminster Abbey. Ceremonies are limited because of plague.
- August 17 – The Accademia dei Lincei, the oldest scientific academy in the world, is founded in Rome by Federico Cesi.
- September 20
  - Samuel Champlain arrives back in France.
  - Ottoman–Safavid War (1603–1618): Led by Iranian Emperor Abbas the Great, the Safavid Army of Iran stages a surprise attack on Tabriz, which had been taken from the Safavids by the Ottoman Empire in 1588. Tabriz is recaptured after 29 days.

==== October–December ====
- October 6 – On the Philippine island of Luzon, the Sangley Rebellion against Spanish rule ends with the massacre of 20,000 Sangley Chinese residents in Manila.
- October 18 – Yemişçi Hasan Pasha, the Grand Vizier of the Ottoman Empire, is executed on orders of Sultan Mehmed III, after failing to respond more quickly to the Safavid Empire's actions to take Tabriz. The Sultan appoints Yavuz Ali Pasha, the Ottoman Governor of Egypt to replace Yemişçi Hasan.
- October 21 – Ottoman–Safavid War (1603–1618): The Safavid Army of Iran, led by Emperor Abbas the Great, recaptures Tabriz from the Ottoman Empire after 15 years of Ottoman occupation.
- November 15 – Having recaptured Tabriz from the Ottoman Empire, Abbas the Great leads the Safavids in a siege of Yerevan.
- November 17 – Sir Walter Raleigh goes on trial for treason, in the converted Great Hall of Winchester Castle. He is found guilty, but his life is spared by King James I at this time, and he is returned to imprisonment in the Tower of London.
- November – Rokugō rebellion: More than 1,000 rōnin rebel in support of their exiled lord, Onodera Yoshimichi, in Japan.
- December 22 – Sultan Mehmed III of the Ottoman Empire dies, and is succeeded by his son Ahmed I.
- December 29 – Yavuz Ali Pasha, who had been appointed by Mehmed III in October as Grand Vizier of the Ottoman Empire, arrives at Constantinople to begin service. He dies from illness seven months later.

==== Ongoing events ====
- Russian famine of 1601–1603.

==== Date unknown ====
- A rebellion breaks out in Transylvania.
- French Huguenot Pierre de Gua is granted royal permission to settle in North America, founding the colony of Acadia.
- Yaqob is deposed as Emperor of Ethiopia for the first time by Za Sellase, who appoints his cousin Za Dengel to replace him.
- Johann Bayer publishes the star atlas Uranometria, the first to cover the entire celestial sphere.
- Japanese female entertainer Izumo no Okuni originates kabuki dance drama in Kyoto.
- The earliest of eight companies that will eventually merge to form the Kikkoman Corporation, the producers of soy sauce, is founded in Japan.

=== 1604 ===
==== January–March ====
- January 1 – The earliest recorded performance of William Shakespeare's play A Midsummer Night's Dream takes place at Hampton Court prior to the main presentation, The Masque of Indian and China Knights, which is performed by courtiers of King James.
- January 14 – The Hampton Court Conference is held between James I of England, the Anglican bishops and representatives of the Puritans. Work begins on the Authorized King James Version of the Bible and revision of the Book of Common Prayer.
- February 14 – King James of England denounces the Roman Catholic Church after learning from one of his spies, Sir Anthony Standen, that Queen Anne has been sent a rosary from the Pope.
- February 17 – King James issues an order for all Jesuits and all Roman Catholic priests to leave his kingdom by March 19.
- February 24 – At Linköping in Sweden, the Riksdag declares that Sigismund, Grand Duke of Lithuania and King of Poland, who has been absent for five years, has effectively abdicated as King of Sweden, and recognizes Karl, Duke of Södermanland, as the new monarch.
- March 15 – More than seven months after their July 25, 1603 coronation, King James I and Anne, Queen consort make the traditional Royal Entry to London. The ceremonies have been postponed from 1603 because of the ongoing plague.
- March 19 – King James opens his first parliamentary session as King of England. In his opening speech to the "Blessed Parliament", the King makes clear that he wants to bring a legal union between England and Scotland and that he does not wish to be "a husband to two wives." The House of Commons refuses to agree with him on the unification of the crown or on the funding that the King requests.
- March 22 – Karl IX begins his reign as King of Sweden.

==== April–June ====
- April 9 – On the first day of the new year 966 M.E. on the Burmese calendar, King Nyaungyan Min of Burma makes a triumphant return to his capital at Inwa after his victory in the war against the principality of Mongnai (Monē), one of the Shan States between Burma and Siam
- April 17 – Tsar Dmitry of Russia makes a public conversion to Roman Catholicism in order to attract the aid of Jesuits in his attempt to rule all of Russia.
- April 18 – Maurice of Nassau assembles a combined army of 7,000 Dutch and 4,000 English soldiers to make an attack on the Spanish Netherlands (now Belgium).
- May 19 – Maurice of Nassau begins the Siege of Sluis, a port in the Spanish Netherlands, with 11,000 Dutch and English troops. Despite reinforcements from Spanish relief troops, the city surrenders after three months, with both sides having lost hundreds of casualties.
- May 20
  - Five conspirators in England, led by Robert Catesby, who has invited Thomas Wintour, John Wright, Thomas Percy and Guy Fawkes, meet at the Duck and Drake Inn in London to make a plan for the assassination of King James.
  - Peace discussions between England and Spain begin at Somerset House in London to end the Anglo-Spanish War after 19 years of fighting.
- May 22 – English entrepreneur Charles Leigh and a crew of 46 arrive in South America at what is now the Oyapock River in French Guiana after traveling on the ship Olive Plant. The 35 men and boys who stay create a colonial settlement which they call Oliveleigh, and make a claim to all of the area.
- June 9 – Thomas Percy, one of the English conspirators in the Gunpowder Plot to assassinate King James I, is appointed as one of the king's bodyguards by the Earl of Northumberland.
- June 15 – Ottoman–Safavid War: General Cigalazade Yusuf Sinan Pasha, commander of the eastern Ottoman Army, leads troops on a march from Constantinople to fight the Persia's Safavid Army in Armenia, but arrives too late to save the city of Yerevan.
- June – Ottoman–Safavid War (1603–18): Shāh Abbas I of Persia's Safavid army captures the city of Yerevan from the Ottoman Empire after a siege. At this time the Shāh begins the expulsion of Armenians from Jolfa to New Julfa in his capital of Isfahan; more than 25,000 die during the exodus.

==== July–September ====
- July 4 – The Jesuits Act 1603 (officially "An Act for the due execution of the Statutes against Jesuits, seminary Priests and recusants") is given royal assent by King James I of England to create penalties against Jesuits and Catholics who send their children abroad to Catholic colleges.
- July 7
  - On 11 Safar 1013 AH in the Islamic calendar, the decree of Ottoman Sultan Ahmed I is read aloud in the Great Mosque of Mecca, declaring that Idris ibn Hasan has been proclaimed the new Sharif of Mecca, in partnership with Idris's brother Fuhayd ibn Hasan and Idris and Fuhayd's nephew, Muhsin ibn Husayn
  - King James angrily dismisses the English parliament after failing to get full financial subsidies. He tells the members in his closing speech, "I am not of such a stock as to praise fools."
- July 16 – The last of the 18 sessions of the English and Spanish peace conference is held at the Old Somerset House in London, with the parties reaching an agreement on terms of a treaty.
- July 22 – King James begins fundraising for his project for an accurate translation of the Holy Bible into English, asking Richard Bancroft, Archbishop of Canterbury, to contact all Anglican churches for donations.
- August 5 – Sokolluzade Mehmed Pasha becomes the new Ottoman Grand Vizier, replacing the late Yavuz Ali Pasha
- August 18 – England concludes the Treaty of London with Spain, ending the Anglo-Spanish War (1585–1604), an intermittent conflict within the Eighty Years' War.
- August 19 – The Dutch siege of Sluis in the Spanish Netherlands ends after three months, a day after relief troops commanded by General Ambrogio Spinola retreat. At least 2,000 of the members of the Spanish garrison inside had been killed or incapacitated by disease and famine. Sluis becomes part of the Netherlands afterward.
- September 1 – Sri Guru Granth Sahib, the religious text of Sikhism, whose compilation by Guru Arjan was completed on August 29, is installed at Harmandir Sahib in Amritsar.
- September 20 – After a bloody three-year siege. Ostend is finally captured by Spanish forces under Ambrogio Spinola

==== October–December ====
- October 4 – Za Dengel, Emperor of Ethiopia, is killed in battle with the forces of Za Sellase, who restores his cousin Yaqob to the throne.
- October 9 – Kepler's Supernova (SN 1604) is first observed from the northern parts of the Italian Peninsula. Beginning on October 17, Johannes Kepler begins a year's observation of it from Prague. There won't be another supernova visible to the "naked-eye" until 1987. As of 2023, this is the last supernova to be observed in the Milky Way.
- November 1 – The first recorded performance of William Shakespeare's tragedy, Othello, takes place at the Palace of Whitehall in London.
- December 26 – On the evening of Saint Stephen's Day), the first recorded performance of Shakespeare's "problem play" Measure for Measure takes place, before King James I of England in the banquet hall of the Palace of Whitehall.
- December 29 – The 1604 Quanzhou earthquake, with an estimated 8.1 magnitude, shakes the Taiwan Strait leaving several dead.

==== Date unknown ====
- France begins settling Acadia, first successful French North American colony.
- Before 1 October, Huntingdon Beaumont completes the Wollaton Wagonway, built to transport coal from the mines at Strelley to Wollaton just west of Nottingham, England, the world's oldest wagonway with provenance.
- The Table Alphabeticall, the first known English dictionary to be organized by alphabetical ordering, is published.
- First publication of Christopher Marlowe's play The Tragical History of Doctor Faustus, in London.
- Lancelot de Casteau's L'Ouverture de cuisine published in Liège, including the first printed recipe for choux pastry.

==== Religion ====
- According to legend, the vault of Christian Rosenkreuz is discovered.
- The Papacy is expected to fall this year by Tobias Hess and Simon Studion according to their correspondence in 1597.

=== 1605 ===
==== January–March ====
- January 1 – William Shakespeare's play A Midsummer Night's Dream, copyrighted 1600, is given its earliest recorded performance, and witnessed by the Viscount Dorchester.
- January 7 – Shakespeare's play Henry V, copyrighted 1600, is given its earliest recorded performance, presented by the Lord Chamberlain's Men for King James I of England.
- January 15 – Shakespeare's play Love's Labour's Lost, copyrighted 1598, is given its second recorded performance, probably presented at the home of the Earl of Southampton for Queen Anne, wife of King James I of England.
- January 16 – The first part of Miguel de Cervantes' satire on the theme of chivalry, Don Quixote (El ingenioso hidalgo don Quixote de la Mancha, "The Ingenious Hidalgo Don Quixote of La Mancha"), is published in Madrid. One of the first significant novels in the western literary tradition, it becomes a global bestseller almost at once.
- February 3 – The 1605 Keichō earthquake, of estimated 7.9 magnitude, strikes Japan south of the island of Honshu, and triggers a tsunami that washes away hundreds of houses and kills thousands of people.
- February 10 – Shakespeare's play The Merchant of Venice is given its earliest recorded performance, presented by the King's Men players at the Palace of Whitehall for King James I of England. A second performance is given on February 12, Shrove Tuesday, at the King's request.
- February 21 – Stephen Bocskai is elected Prince of Transylvania at the capital, Belugrad (modern-day Alba Iulia in Romania.)
- February 25 – Admiral Steven van der Hagen leads a fleet of ships for the Dutch East India Company and makes the first capture of land for the Netherlands in what will become the Dutch East Indies, and later Indonesia. Hagen's men capture the Portuguese citadel of Forte Amboino and the rest of Ambon Island, and make it the capital of the Dutch possessions in Asia.
- March 11 – A proclamation declares all people of Ireland to be the direct subjects of the British Crown and not of any local lord or chief.
- March 3 – Pope Clement VIII dies at the age of 69 after a reign of 13 years.
- March 14 – The March–April 1605 papal conclave of Roman Catholic cardinals to elect a successor to Pope Clement VIII opens at the Vatican in Rome, 11 days after Clement's death. Sixty-one of the 69 cardinals meet behind closed doors for the rest of the month. Discussion becomes heated, with shouting and jostling.

==== April–June ====
- April 1 – Cardinal Alessandro Ottaviano de' Medici, the Bishop of Pistoia, is elected by the assembled 61 cardinals at the papal conclave after 17 days of balloting. He takes the regnal name of Pope Leo XI to become the 232nd pope, but serves for less than four weeks.
- April 8 – The city of Oulu (Swedish: Uleåborg) is founded by King Charles IX of Sweden.
- April 13 – Tsar Boris Godunov dies; Feodor II accedes to the Russian throne.
- April 16
  - Tokugawa Ieyasu abdicates as shogun of Japan, becoming Ogosho (retired shogun). His son Tokugawa Hidetada succeeds him to the office.
  - In England, John Winthrop, later governor of the future Massachusetts Bay Colony, marries his first wife (of 4), Mary Forth, daughter of John Forth, of Great Stambridge, Essex.
- April 27 – Pope Leo XI dies suddenly from a cold at the age of 69, after a reign of only 26 days, prompting the return of the cardinals for the second papal conclave in less than two months. During his brief reign, the Pope issued a bill requiring secret balloting in papal conclaves.
- May 8 – A group of 59 Roman Catholic cardinals assemble at Rome for another papal conclave to elect a successor to Pope Leo XI. During the meeting, a fistfight breaks out among the cardinals over the two rival candidates, Antonio Sauli and Domenico Toschi, neither of whom receive the necessary 40 votes for a two-thirds election. In the fight, Cardinal Alfonso Visconti sustains several fractures.
- May 16 – Camillo Borghese, Cardinal Vicar of Rome and cardinal-priest of Sant'Eusebio is elected the 233rd pope, and takes the name of Pope Paul V. Another "Year of Three Popes" will not occur until 373 years later, in 1978. Borghese is elected as a compromise candidate after the physical disagreements during the conclave.
- June 1 – Russian troops in Moscow imprison Feodor II and his mother, later executing them.
- June 20 – Pretender Dmitriy and his supporters, including troops of the Polish–Lithuanian Commonwealth, march to Moscow.

==== July–September ====
- July 4 – A proclamation commands all Roman Catholic seminary priests and Jesuits to leave Ireland by December 10 and directs the laity to attend Church of Ireland services.
- July 13 – The 1605 Guangdong earthquake, of 7.5 magnitude, strikes China's Hainan Province causing widespread damage and thousands of deaths.
- July 21 – Claiming to be Dmitriy, son of Ivan the Terrible, a pretender is officially crowned Tsar Dimitriy Ioannovich of Russia in Moscow by Patriarch Ignatius.
- August 14 – A Spanish attack on the Moorish fortress of Hammamet, in Ottoman Tunisia, ends in a disaster for the Spaniards. Although Spanish troops had managed to scale the walls and open the gates, they are suddenly ordered to retreat and are massacred while waiting on the coast for the return of the ships that brought them.
- August 19 – Eighty Years' War: The siege of the Dutch city of Lingen, by 13,000 Spanish troops and 3,000 cavalry, ends with the surrender of Captain Maerten Cobben after nine days of defense. Although the Dutch Republic's stadtholder, Maurice, Prince of Orange, had proclaimed that Lingen must be held at all costs, Dutch troops failed to come to Cobben's aid and Don Ambrogio Spinola of Spain peacefully takes control of the city.
- September 27 – Swedish armies are decisively defeated by Polish–Lithuanian Commonwealth cavalry in the Battle of Kircholm.

==== October–December ====
- October 27 – The 3rd Mughal Emperor, Akbar "the Great", dies of dysentery at Fatehpur Sikri in India.
- October 28 – Eighty Years' War: Spanish troops under Ambrogio Spinola, 1st Marquess of Los Balbases, Captain-General of the Army of Flanders (newly appointed a Knight of the Order of the Golden Fleece), occupy Wachtendonk after a 20-day siege.
- October
  - The first issue of Relation aller Fürnemmen und gedenckwürdigen Historien by Johann Carolus in Strasbourg (Holy Roman Empire), generally regarded as the world's first newspaper, is published. De Nieuwe Tijdinghen, a Dutch proto-newspaper, is also published this year.
  - Francis Bacon's Of the Proficience and Advancement of Learning, Divine and Human is published in London.
- November 3 – Jahangir, the fourth Mughal Emperor, begins his 22-year reign over the Mughal Empire in northern India.
- November 5 (O.S.) – The Gunpowder Plot, a scheme to bomb England's Palace of Westminster during the opening of Parliament, is foiled after Sir Thomas Knyvet is tipped off, and finds Catholic plotter Guy Fawkes in a cellar below the Parliament building. Knyvet orders a search of the area and 36 barrels of gunpowder are found. Fawkes is arrested for trying to assassinate King James I and the members who had been scheduled to sit together in Parliament the next day.
- November 6 – The Iranian Safavid ruler Abbas the Great leads the Persian troops to a victory over a larger force of Ottoman Empire troops in the Battle of Sufiyan, and captures Tabriz.
- December 6 – In England, Thomas Bonham petitions to become a member of the College of Physicians in order for his practice to be legal, and is rejected. Dr. Bonham continues to practice, and is eventually imprisoned on November 13, 1606, leading to the landmark decision in Dr. Bonham's Case in 1610.
- December 11 – King Sigismund III of Poland marries his former sister-in-law, Constance, daughter of Charles II, Archduke of Austria, after Rudolf II, Holy Roman Emperor refuses to permit the King to marry Anna of Tyrol. King Sigismund, a widow, had previously been married to Constance's older sister, Anne.
- December 21 – On behalf of Spain, Portuguese navigator Pedro Fernandes de Queirós begins his expedition to the South Pacific Ocean with 160 men on three ships. Queiros departs from Callao in the Viceroyalty of Peru with his flagship, San Pedro y San Pablo, and San Pedro and Los Tres Reyes.

==== Date unknown ====
- Habitation at Port-Royal established by France under Pierre Dugua, Sieur de Mons, the first European colonization of Nova Scotia in North America (at this time part of Acadia); the Gregorian calendar is adopted.
- Crew of the Olive become the first English visitors to Barbados.
- Refugee French Huguenot merchants begin to settle in Dublin and Waterford.
- The Priory of St. Gregory's is founded at Douai, Flanders, at this time in the Spanish Netherlands, by its first prior, John Roberts, and other exiles, thus becoming the first English Benedictine house to renew conventual life after the English Reformation. More than two centuries later the community will establish Downside Abbey back in England.
- The Irish College in Paris is co-founded by John Lee, an Irish priest, and John de l'Escalopier, President of the Parlement.
- Central Mexico's Amerindian population reaches one million.

=== 1606 ===
==== January–March ====
- January 9 – The Black Nazarene, a statue, arrives in Manila from Mexico.
- January 24 – Gunpowder Plot: The trial of Guy Fawkes and other conspirators, for plotting against Parliament and James I of England, begins in London. They are hanged, drawn and quartered on January 30–31.
- January 29 – Explorer Pedro Fernandes de Queirós of Portugal, accompanied by a party of 160 men on the ships San Pedro, San Pablo and Los Tres Reyes, leads the first Europeans to discover the Pitcairn Islands.
- February 9 – Queirós and his crew discover Mehetia, followed three days later by the Tauere atoll.
- February 26 – Sailing on the Dutch ship Duyfken, Dutch navigator Willem Janszoon and the crew make the first confirmed sighting of Australia by a European, reaching the Cape York Peninsula, at the Pennefather River near what is now Weipa, Queensland. The Duyfken follows by exploring the western coast.
- March 19 – Ferdinando I de' Medici, Grand Duke of Tuscany, in the Fortezza Vecchia Chapel of Saint Francesco, elevates Livorno to the rank of city.

==== April–June ====
- April 10 – Charter of 1606: The First Charter of Virginia is adopted, by which King James I of England grants rights to the Virginia Company (comprising the London Company and Plymouth Company) to settle parts of the east coast of North America.
- April 12 – The first version of the Union Flag is created, to be worn as a national flag by English and Scottish ships.
- April 17 – Venetian Interdict: Pope Paul V places the Republic of Venice under an interdict, as well as excommunicating Leonardo Donato, the Doge of Venice, and members of the Venetian Senate.
- May 1 – Pedro Fernandes de Queirós discovers the islands of Vanuatu (formerly the New Hebrides). Believing them to be Australia, he names them La Austrialia del Espiritu Santo.
- May 17 – Russia's Tsar Dmitry I is assassinated in the Kremlin by supporters of Vasili Shuisky.
- May 19 – Vasili Ivanovich Shuisky becomes the new Tsar of Russia as Vasili IV.
- June or October – Battle of Cape St. Vincent: An improvised Spanish fleet under Luis Fajardo defeats the Dutch fleet under Willem Haultain.
- June 21 – Derviş Mehmed Pasha is appointed the new Grand Vizier of the Ottoman Empire by Sultan Ahmed I after Sokolluzade Lala Mehmed Pasha dies of a stroke. Derviş Mehmed serves less than six months before Ahmed suddenly has him executed.
- June 22 – By Act of Parliament in England, all Roman Catholics in England become required to swear an oath of allegiance to King James I, a Protestant raised in the Presbyterian Church in Scotland.
- June 23 – A treaty is signed in Vienna between the Archduchy of Austria and the semi-independent Principality of Transylvania. Archduke Rudolf agrees to recognize Stephen Bocskai as Prince of Transylvania in return for Bocksay's guarantee of constitutional and religious rights to the ethnic Hungarians within Transylvania's borders.

==== July–September ====
- July 1 – Scottish minister Patrick Simson and 44 other ministers of the Church of Scotland sign Simson's Protest to the Scottish Parliament against the introduction to Scotland of a hierarchy of bishops.
- July 3 – The Russian Orthodox bishop Hermogenes is installed as the new Patriarch of Moscow and all Russia, replacing Ignatius.
- July 10
  - Simion Movilă becomes the new Prince of Moldavia upon the death of his older brother, Ieremia Movilă. Simion will reign for only 14 months before being poisoned on September 14, 1607.
  - England deports 47 Roman Catholic priests, including Thomas Garnet, putting them on board a ship bound for Flanders in what is now Belgium. A royal proclamation is read to the group, warning them that they will be put to death if they ever return to the British Isles.
- July 14 – The expedition commanded by Portuguese explorer Luís Vaz de Torres, with the ships San Pedrico and Los Tres Reyes Magos, makes the first European sighting of South Pacific islands in New Guinea, starting with Rossel Island and Tagula Island. Discoveries follow on July 18 (Basilaki Island and Sideia Island), July 20 (the Dumoulin Islands and Sariba Island, and July 30 (Doini Island).
- July 24 – King Christian IV of Denmark, as the guest of his brother-in-law, King James of England, Scotland and Ireland, is welcomed at London, and the two monarchs are driven by coaches to a banquet at Theobalds House at Cheshunt, Hertfordshire. They are entertained by playwright Ben Jonson's play, The Entertainment of the Kings of Great Britain and Denmark.
- July 31 – Playwright John Marston presents his own original play to King James and King Christian during the Danish monarch's visit to London.
- August 16 – Battle of Cape Rachado: A Dutch fleet is defeated by the Portuguese.
- August (approx.) – Possible first performance of William Shakespeare's tragedy Macbeth in London.
- September 20 – The trial of alleged poisoners in the Frankenstein gravediggers scandal begins in the Bohemian town of Frankenstein.

==== October–December ====
- October 2 – King Charles IX of Sweden founds the city of Vaasa, to the Korsholm Parish in the Coastal Ostrobothnia.
- October – Luís Vaz de Torres is the first European to sail through the Torres Strait.
- November 11 – The Peace of Zsitvatorok is signed, between the Ottoman and Holy Roman Empires. The independence of Transylvania is recognized by both sides, and Austria's annual tribute to the Ottomans is abolished.
- December 19 – The Susan Constant sets out from the River Thames in England leading the Virginia Company's fleet for the foundation of Jamestown, Virginia.
- December 26 – William Shakespeare's play King Lear is given its first recorded performance, staged at the Palace of Whitehall.

=== 1607 ===
==== January–March ====
- January 13 – The Bank of Genoa fails.
- January 19 – San Agustin Church, Manila, is officially completed; by the 21st century it will be the oldest church in the Philippines.
- January 30 – Coastal flooding around Britain, probably a storm surge, including Bristol Channel floods in which a massive wave sweeps along the Bristol Channel, killing an estimated 2,000 people.
- February 24 – Claudio Monteverdi's L'Orfeo, the earliest fully developed opera in the modern-day repertoire, premieres at the Ducal Palace of Mantua.
- March 10 – Battle of Gol in Gojjam: Susenyos defeats the combined armies of Yaqob and Abuna Petros II, which makes him Emperor of Ethiopia.

==== April–June ====
- April 25 – Battle of Gibraltar: A Dutch fleet of 26 warships, led by Admiral Jacob van Heemskerck, stages a surprise attack on a Spanish fleet anchored in the Bay of Gibraltar. In the battle that ensues, Spain loses as many as 10 galleons and 12 smaller ships, and at least 300 men are killed. The disaster causes Spain to go into bankruptcy by October.
- April 26 – English colonists make landfall at Cape Henry, Virginia, later moving up the James River.
- May 14 – Jamestown, Virginia, is established as the first permanent English settlement in North America, beginning the American frontier.
- May 15 – From Jamestown, Christopher Newport, George Percy, Gabriel Archer and others travel six days exploring along the James River up to the falls and Powhatan's village.
- May 26 – At Jamestown, the president of the governing council, Edward Wingfield, directs the fort to be strengthened and armed against the many attacks of the natives: "Hereupon the President was contented the Fort should be pallisadoed, the ordinance mounted, his men armed and exercised, for many were the assaults and Ambuscadoes of the Savages ..." 200 armed Indians attack the Jamestown settlement, killing two people and wounding 10.
- May 28 – A wooden defensive wall (palisade) is built by settlers around the Fort at Jamestown. Gabriel Archer writes in his journal, "we laboured, pallozadoing our fort".
- June 5 – Dr John Hall marries Susanna, daughter of William Shakespeare, at the Church of the Holy Trinity, Stratford-upon-Avon (England).
- June 8 – Newton rebellion: The Tresham landowning family kills more than 40 peasants during protests against the enclosure of common land in Newton, Northamptonshire, England, at the culmination of the Midland Revolt.
- June 10 – In Jamestown, Captain John Smith is released from arrest and sworn in as a member of the colony Council.
- June 15 – At Jamestown, the triangular fort is completed and armed: "The fifteenth of June we had built and finished our Fort, which was triangle wise, having three Bulwarkes, at every corner, like a halfe Moone, and foure or five pieces of Artillerie mounted in them. We had made our selves sufficiently strong for these Savages. We had also sowne most of our Corne on two Mountaines." The colony reportedly bears extreme toil in strengthening the fort.
- June 22 – Christopher Newport sails back to England.

==== July–September ====
- July 2 – Luis de Velasco returns to office as the Spanish Viceroy of New Spain, which at this time includes Mexico, parts of the future United States and much of Central America. Velasco had previously been Viceroy from 1590 to 1595, then served as Viceroy of Peru (encompassing much of South America) from 1596 to 1604. He serves as New Spain's viceroy until 1611.
- July 5 – Zebrzydowski Rebellion: The Battle of Guzów is fought in Poland near Guzów against rebels by the combined armies of the Polish–Lithuanian Commonwealth, led by Poland's Hetman, General Stanisław Żółkiewski, and the Hetman of Lithuania, Jan Karol Chodkiewicz. The rebels, led by Mikołaj Zebrzydowski and Janusz Radziwiłł, are forced to retreat.
- July 10 – Ottoman Grand Vizier Kuyucu Murad Pasha launches a secret expedition to confront rebel Kurdish tribal chief Ali Janbulad, who has seized control of Aleppo in what is now Syria.
- July 17 – In the (modern-day) South Kalimantan province of Indonesia, Sultan Mustain Billah of Banjar orders the massacre of the crew of a Netherlands East India Company ship visiting the capital at Banjarmasin.
- July 20 – The second "False Dmitry", one of three people claiming to be Dmitry Ivanovich, son of the late Tsar Ivan the Terrible, appears at the Russian town of Starodub and persuades residents that he is the rightful heir to the Russian throne.
- August 3 – After Catholics and Protestants clash in Donauwörth, emperor Rudolph II declares an imperial ban over the city and orders Bavarian duke Maximilian I to execute the ban leading to the occupation of the city by a force of 15,000 in December. This in turn leads to the creation of the Protestant Union in 1608.
- August 13 – The ship Gift of God of the Plymouth Company arrives at the mouth of the modern-day Kennebec River in Maine. English colonists establish Fort St. George, also known as the Popham Colony. The settlement lasts little more than a year, before residents return to England in the first oceangoing ship built in the New World, a 30-ton pinnace called The Virginia.
- September 5 – Hamlet is performed aboard the East India Company ship Red Dragon, under the command of Capt. William Keeling, anchored off the coast of Sierra Leone, the first known performance of a Shakespeare play outside England in English, and the first by amateurs.
- September 10 – Jamestown President Edward Maria Wingfield is deposed and John Ratcliffe elected.
- September 14 – Flight of the Earls: Hugh O'Neill, 2nd Earl of Tyrone, and Rory O'Donnell, 1st Earl of Tyrconnell, flee Ireland for Spain with 90 followers, to avoid capture by the English crown, never to return.
- September – The Scrooby Congregation of Protestant English Separatists attempt to flee to the Dutch Republic from Boston, Lincolnshire, but are betrayed, arrested and imprisoned for a time.

==== October–December ====
- October 4 – Flight of the Earls: The Earl of Tyrone and the Earl of Tyrconnell, along with their followers, reach the European continent, landing on St. Francis' Day at Quilleboeuf in France with 99 people. after having departed Rathmullan in Ireland on September 12.
- October 27 – Halley's Comet is seen by Johannes Kepler.
- November 7 – A Dutch warship commanded by Admiral Cornelis Matelief de Jonge arrives at the Malay Peninsula to attempt opening trade with the Pahang Sultanate, and get Pahang's assistance in the Dutch Navy's fight against the Portuguese Navy in Asian trade. Sultan Abdul Ghafur agrees to assistance in return for Dutch technical assistance.
- November 9 – King Philip III of Spain announces that his government had run out of money and that it is suspending payments on its foreign debts. effectively declaring the state bankrupt. The decision in the wake of the destruction of most of the ships of Spain's Navy at the April 25 Battle of Gibraltar.
- November 15 – Flight of the Earls: After the departure from Ireland of Hugh O'Neill, Earl of Tyrone and Rory O'Donnell, 1st Earl of Tyrconnell, along with 90 of their followers, King James I of England, Scotland and Ireland issues a proclamation "that the flight of the Earles of Tyrone and Tyrconell, with some others of their fellowes out of the North parts of our Realme of Ireland; these men's corruption and falshood, whose hainous offences remaine so fresh in memorie since they declared themselves so very monsters in nature, as they did not only whithdraw themselues from their personall obedience to their Soveraigne, but were content to sell over their Native Countrey to those that stood at that time in the highest termes of hostilitie with the two Crownes of England and Ireland... we doe hereby professe in the worde of a King, that... notwithstanding all that they can claime, must be acknowledged to proceed from meere Grace upon their submission after their great and unnaturall Treasons", and must forfeit their rights and possessions as nobles.
- December 10 – Captain John Smith and nine men depart the Jamestown Colony on a barge in order to get more corn for the English fort. Sailing up the Chickahominy River, the boat reaches a settlement of the Appomattoc tribe at Apocant. While Smith, Jehu Robinson and Thomas Emery are further upstream in a canoe, George Casson is captured at Apocant by Opchanacanough, brother of Chief Powhatan. Robinson and Emery are killed while Smith is away from their camp, and Smith is soon taken prisoner by Opchancanough and, on January 5, is delivered to Powhatan at Werowocomoco for execution. After an intervention by Powhatan's daughter, Pocahontas, Smith is released a month after his capture.
- December 22 – A fleet of 13 Dutch warships under the command of Admiral Pieter Verhoeff departs the Netherlands on an expedition to the Indian Ocean to open trade with Asian nations and to fight hostile resistance. Verhoeff never returns, and he and many of his crew will be ambushed and killed on May 22 at the Banda Islands in Indonesia.

==== Date unknown ====
- The rule of Andorra passes jointly to the king of France, and the Bishop of Urgell.
- In the Midland Revolt against Enclosures in England, the term Levellers is first used.
- Missionary Juan Fonte establishes the first Jesuit mission among the Tarahumara, in the Sierra Madre Mountains of Northwest Mexico.

=== 1608 ===
==== January–March ====
- January 2 – The first of the Jamestown supply missions returns to the Colony of Virginia with Christopher Newport commanding the John and Francis and the Phoenix bringing about 100 new settlers to supplement the 38 survivors he finds at Jamestown.
- January 7 – At Jamestown, Virginia, fire destroys "all the houses in the fort"; the fort is repaired in March.
- January 11 – John Smith is released by Powhatan after 15 days of captivity, and arrives back at Jamestown the next day. Upon his return, instead of being welcomed, he is charged with negligence for the deaths of the two men with him at the time of his capture, Jehu Robinson and Thomas Emery, but later exonerated.
- January 17 – Emperor Susenyos I of Ethiopia defeats an Oromo army at Ebenat; 12,000 Oromo are reportedly killed at a cost of 400 Amhara.
- January 23 – Treaty of The Hague, a defensive alliance between France and the United Provinces of the Netherlands, is signed.
- February 6 – Gabriel Báthory makes an agreement with Hungarian mercenary soldiers, the Hajduk, in order to overthrow the government of Transylvania.
- February 7 – A peace conference opens at the Binnenhof at The Hague, in the Netherlands, to end a war between the Dutch Republic and the Spanish Netherlands (now Belgium).
- February 14 – The brutal winter of 1607-1608 in England ends after 10 weeks of sub-freezing temperatures.
- February 18 – Don Julius Caesar d'Austria, the illegitimate son of Rudolf II, Holy Roman Emperor, brutally murders his girlfriend, Markéta Pichlerová, then dismembers her body. Emperor Rudolf imprisons Julius for the rest of his life.
- February 26 – After being held captive in Morocco for more than 13 years, popular professor Malian Ahmad Baba is able to return to Timbuktu on 10 Dhu 'l-Qa'da 1016 A.H.
- March 5 – Sigismund Rákóczi, Prince of Transylvania, abdicates in favor of Gabriel Báthory in order to avoid a civil war.
- March 16 – Gwanghaegun becomes the new King of Korea upon the death of his father, King Seonjo, who had reigned for more than 40 years.
- March 18 – Susenyos is formally crowned Emperor of Ethiopia, at the ancient city of Axum.

==== April–June ====
- April 10 – Jamestown supply missions: Christopher Newport again sails for England, carrying Powhatan's tribesman Namontack for a visit to London.
- April 19 – The Burning of Derry launches O'Doherty's Rebellion in the Kingdom of Ireland.
- April 20 – Old Bushmills Distillery is first licensed to distil whiskey at Bushmills, County Antrim, Ireland by King James I.
- May 8 – A newly nationalized silver mine in Scotland at Hilderston, West Lothian is re-opened by Bevis Bulmer.
- May 14 – The Protestant Union is founded in Auhausen.
- June 15 – During a voyage in the Arctic Ocean, explorer Henry Hudson and the crew of the Hopewell sight what they claim to be a mermaid, swimming in the seas near Norway.
- June 26 – Matthias I, already King of Bohemia becomes the King of Hungary and the King of Croatia upon the abdication of both jobs by his older brother, Rudolf II, who continues as Holy Roman Emperor.

==== July–September ====
- July 3 – The settlement of Quebec City is founded by Samuel de Champlain.
- August 24 – The first official English representative to India, Captain William Hawkins, lands at Surat.
- September 10 – John Smith is elected council president of Jamestown, and begins expanding the fort.
- September 21 – The University of Oviedo in Spain is founded.
- September 23 – The siege of the Troitsky monastery by the Polish–Lithuanian Commonwealth begins in Russia north of Moscow, but fails after 16 months.

==== October–December ====
- October 1 – The second of the Jamestown supply missions, which set out in July from England, arrives at Jamestown, Virginia, with Christopher Newport commanding the Mary and Margaret carrying 70 settlers, bringing the population back up to 120; the passengers include two women and some skilled artisans, mostly from continental Europe, to develop industries.
- October 2 – Dutch lens maker Hans Lippershey demonstrates the first telescope in the Dutch Parliament.
- November 19 – In Budapest, the coronation ceremonies take place for Matthias to be crowned as King Mátyás II of Hungary.
- November 20 – Sir Thomas Gates, Governor of the London Company's colony at Jamestown, Virginia, is ordered by the Board of Directors to forcibly convert the native Indians in the area to Christianity as Anglicans.
- November 30 – At the colony of Portuguese Macau, a port on the Chinese mainland leased from the Chinese Empire, a group of 100 Japanese samurai, wielding katana and muskets engage in a fight with musket-armed Portuguese soldiers commanded by Governor André Pessoa. Around 50 Japanese are killed and the others are imprisoned until they sign an affidavit blaming themselves for the incident. Tokugawa Ieyasu, the principal shogun of Japan, subsequently ends the "red seal ships" program of authorizing Japanese nationals to visit Macau. The incident eventually leads to much larger naval battle in 1610, the Nossa Senhora da Graça incident.
- December 13 – At the Morača monastery in Kolašin, in what is now the nation of Montenegro, Patriarch Jovan Kantul assembles the rebel leaders of Montenegro and Herzegovina. The group agrees with a representative of the Duchy of Savoy to deliver Duke Charles Emmanuel a monarchy within the Balkans, in return for special privileges to the Serbian Orthodox Church.
- December 20 – Karl of the House of Liechtenstein founds the Principality of Liechtenstein within the Holy Roman Empire, an independent nation that will continue more than 400 years later between Austria and Switzerland.
- December – Jamestown supply missions: Christopher Newport returns to England from Jamestown carrying cargo with "tryals of Pitch, Tarre, Glasse, Frankincense, Sope Ashes ..."

==== Date unknown ====
- Spring – The Scrooby Congregation of Protestant English Separatists successfully flees to the Dutch Republic from the Humber, origin of the Pilgrim Fathers who in 1620 move on to North America.
- The first cheques are used in the Dutch Republic.
- The Uniform Land-Tax Law is imposed in Korea.
- Five royal schools in Ulster are given a Royal Charter by King James I.

=== 1609 ===
==== January–March ====
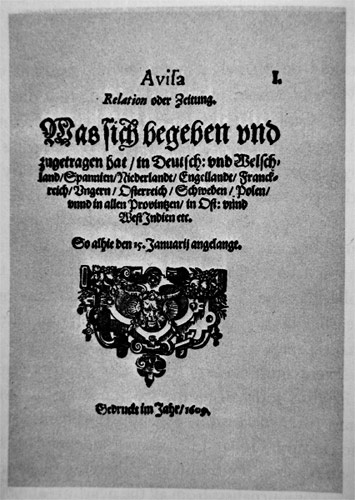
January 15: Avisa newspaper begins publication.

- January 12 – The Basque witch trials are started in Spain as the court of the Inquisition at Logroño receives a letter from the commissioner of the village of Zugarramurdi, and orders the arrest of four women, including María de Jureteguía and María Chipía de Barrenetxea.
- January 15 – One of the world's first newspapers, Avisa Relation oder Zeitung, begins publication in Wolfenbüttel (Holy Roman Empire).
- January 31 – The Bank of Amsterdam is established.
- February 4 – The last day of Keichō 慶長 13 (according to the Japanese lunar calendar).
- March 11 – The Swedish Army, under the command of General Jacob De la Gardie, begins marching east from Vyborg (at this time, part of the Swedish Empire, modern-day Russia) in order to defend the Russian Empire against the Polish-Lithuanian Commonwealth in the course of the Polish–Muscovite War.
- March 19 – The Dutch warship Mauritius sinks off the coast of the Cape of Cape Lopes Gonçalves on the modern-day West African nation of Gabon. The wreckage of the Mauritius will not be located until 375 years later, in 1985.
- March 24 – Led by the Grand Hetman of Lithuania, Jan Karol Chodkiewicz, the Lithuanian Navy breaks the blockade of Riga by sinking two Swedish Navy warships off the coast of Salacgrīva.
- March 25 – Johann Wilhelm, the Roman Catholic Duke of the United Duchies of Jülich-Cleves-Berg in Germany, dies at the capital in Düsseldorf with no heirs. On April 2, his widow, Duchess Antoinette of Lorraine establishes a regency to determine who the successor will be, prompting the War of the Jülich Succession between the states of the Protestant Union and the states of the Catholic League.

==== April–June ====
- April 4
  - King Philip III of Spain signs an edict for the expulsion of the Moriscos from his country with effect from September 11.
  - English explorer Henry Hudson, in the service of the Dutch East India Company, sets out from Amsterdam in the Halve Maen.
- April 5 – Invasion of Ryukyu in Japan: Soldiers of the Shimazu clan capture the castle on Ryukyu Island, beginning to make the Ryukyu Kingdom a vassal of Satsuma Han, but Ryukyu is still allowed to keep itself a tribute state of the Ming and Qing dynasties.
- April 9 – The Netherlands and Spain agree to the Twelve Years' Truce (which lasts until 1621) in the Eighty Years' War, with the signing of the Treaty of Antwerp, allowing the Dutch East India Company to trade within the Spanish Empire.
- May 20 – London publisher Thomas Thorpe issues Shake-speares Sonnets, with a dedication to "Mr. W.H.", and the poem A Lover's Complaint appended; it is uncertain whether this publication has Shakespeare's authority.
- May 23 – The Second Virginia Charter is officially ratified; it is intended to replace the council with a governor, who has absolute control in the colony.
- June 2 – With the Sea Venture as its flagship, a fleet of nine English ships and more than 500 passengers altogether, departs from England to bring supplies to the English settlement in Jamestown, Virginia. The fleet runs into a storm in July and the Sea Venture is wrecked in the Bermuda islands on July 24.
- June 10 – The War of the Jülich Succession begins as the Margraviate of Brandenburg and the Duchy of Palatinate-Neuburg sign a treaty at Dortmund and then send troops to establish Protestant Union rule in the Roman Catholic United Duchies of Jülich-Cleves-Berg.
- June 16 – The Battle of Tashiskari is fought as General Giorgi Saakadze of the Georgian Kingdom of Kartli repels invading troops from the Ottoman Empire before they can capture Tbilisi.
- June 29 – A fleet of ships from the Kingdom of Spain, assisted by a French warship, fights a battle in the Mediterranean Sea against a larger fleet of 23 ships from the North African Eyalet of Tunisia and sinks 21 of them. The other two Tunisian ships are captured.

==== July–September ====
- July 4 – French explorer Samuel de Champlain and his entourage of 60 men in 24 canoes become the first Europeans to enter Lake Champlain, located between the modern-day U.S. states of Vermont and New York.
- July 9 – Bohemia is granted freedom of religion by a 'Letter of Majesty'.
- July 10 – The German Catholic League is formed in Munich by Maximilian I, Elector of Bavaria to counteract the Protestant Union. Maximilian assembles representatives from Augsburg, Konstanz, Passau, Regensburg, and Würzburg in an alliance "for the defense of the Catholic religion and peace" within the Holy Roman Empire.
- July 23 – A three-day hurricane begins in the Caribbean Sea and separates the nine London Company's ships and their 600 passengers who are en route to relieve the Jamestown settlement. One ship sinks, and the flagship is wrecked. Less than 300 settlers make it to Virginia.
- July 25
  - The Sea Venture, flagship of the nine-ship fleet of the London Company is deliberately wrecked at Bermuda during a storm, as Admiral George Somers drives the ship into the reefs of Discovery Bay in order to prevent the ship from sinking. A group of 153 survivors stay, making the first English settlement of the island.
  - After a fight on November 30 in Portuguese Macau between Japanese traders and Portuguese soldiers, Japan's ruling shogun, Tokugawa Ieyasu, strictly prohibits further trade between Japan and Portugal.
- July 30 – At modern-day Crown Point, New York, Samuel de Champlain participates in a battle between the Huron and Iroquois, shooting and killing two Iroquois chiefs; this helps set the tone for French–Iroquois relations for the next 100 years.
- August 10 – The Spanish galleon San Francisco sinks in a storm off the coast of Japan, with the loss of 56 men. Clinging to floating wreckage, the survivors are able to reach Yubanda, near Onjuku in modern-day Chiba Prefecture.
- August 11 – Four ships arrive at the colony of Jamestown, Virginia, with almost 300 men, women and children, to bring supplies for the starving English colonists. They are followed days later by the other three ships remaining from the London Company. Most of the supplies, however, are spoiled by rain and seawater, and many of the passengers are ill with the bubonic plague.
- August 15 (August 5 O.S.) – English astronomer Thomas Harriot becomes the first person to make a detailed drawing of the Moon, based on his observations through a telescope.
- August 25 – Galileo Galilei demonstrates his first telescope to Venetian officials.
- August 28 – Henry Hudson is the first European to see Delaware Bay.
- September 2 – Henry Hudson enters New York Bay, aboard the Halve Maen.
- September 10 – Jamestown: Capt. George Percy replaces Captain John Smith as president of the Council, and Smith returns to England.
- September 11
  - Expulsion of the Moriscos from Valencia in accordance with the edict signed by Philip III on April 4.
  - Henry Hudson in the Halve Maen sails into Upper New York Bay, and begins a journey up the Hudson River.

==== October–December ====
- October 12 – A version of the rhyme Three Blind Mice is published in London. The editor, and possible author of the verse, is the teenage Thomas Ravenscroft.
- November 19 – Archduke Matthias of Austria is formally crowned in Budapest as Mátyás II, King of Hungary, after having been appointed on June 26, 1608.
- November 29 – In Japan, a treaty is signed between Spanish nobleman Rodrigo de Vivero, former Governor-General of the Philippines and the former shogun Tokugawa Ieyasu, for the establishment of a Spanish factory in eastern Japan.
- December 8 – One of the first public libraries, the Biblioteca Ambrosiana, is opened in the Italian city of Milan, founded by Cardinal Federico Borromeo. Unlike other reading rooms, the library houses its collection on shelves along the walls, rather than chained to reading tables.

==== Date unknown ====
- The Dutch East India Company imports tea to Europe.
- The Dutch East India Company establishes a trading post in Hirado, Japan.
- Dutch entrepreneur Isaac Le Maire devizes the concept of selling short shares in order to benefit from a falling Dutch East India Company share price.
- Hugo Grotius publishes Mare Liberum, his legal text on freedom of the seas, in Leiden.
- The Scrooby Congregation of Protestant English Separatists (predecessors of the Pilgrim Fathers) moves from Amsterdam to Leiden.
- Warsaw becomes the capital of Poland.
- The municipality of Buenavista in Marinduque, Philippines is founded.
- The Statutes of Iona are passed, marking the end of the bloody feuds between the clans in the Scottish Highlands.
- The Douay–Rheims Bible Old Testament translation from the Vulgate into English vol. 1 is published in Reims.
- English-born Sister Mary Ward founds the Sisters of Loreto at Saint-Omer, at this time in the Spanish Netherlands.
- Johannes Kepler publishes his first two laws of planetary motion in Astronomia nova.
- Cornelis Drebbel invents the thermostat.
- "Egyptians" (i.e., Romany people) are expelled from the Kingdom of Scotland.

== Births ==
1600

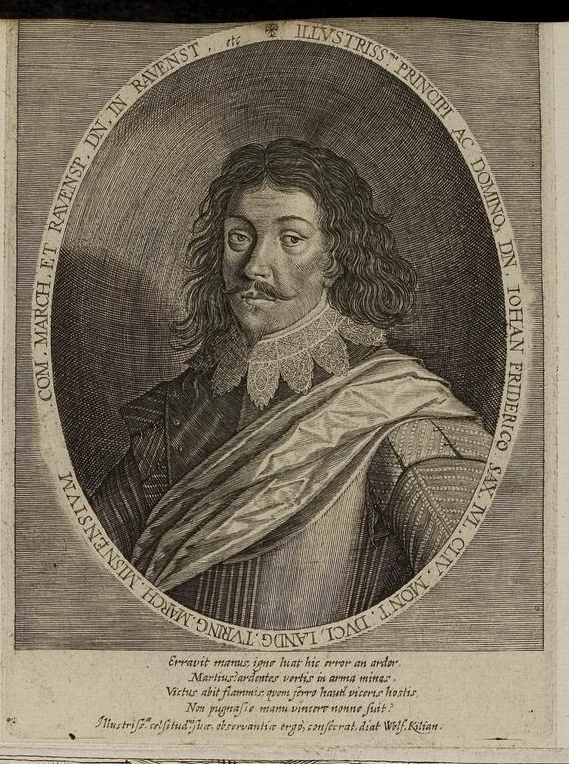
John Frederick, Duke of Saxe-Weimar

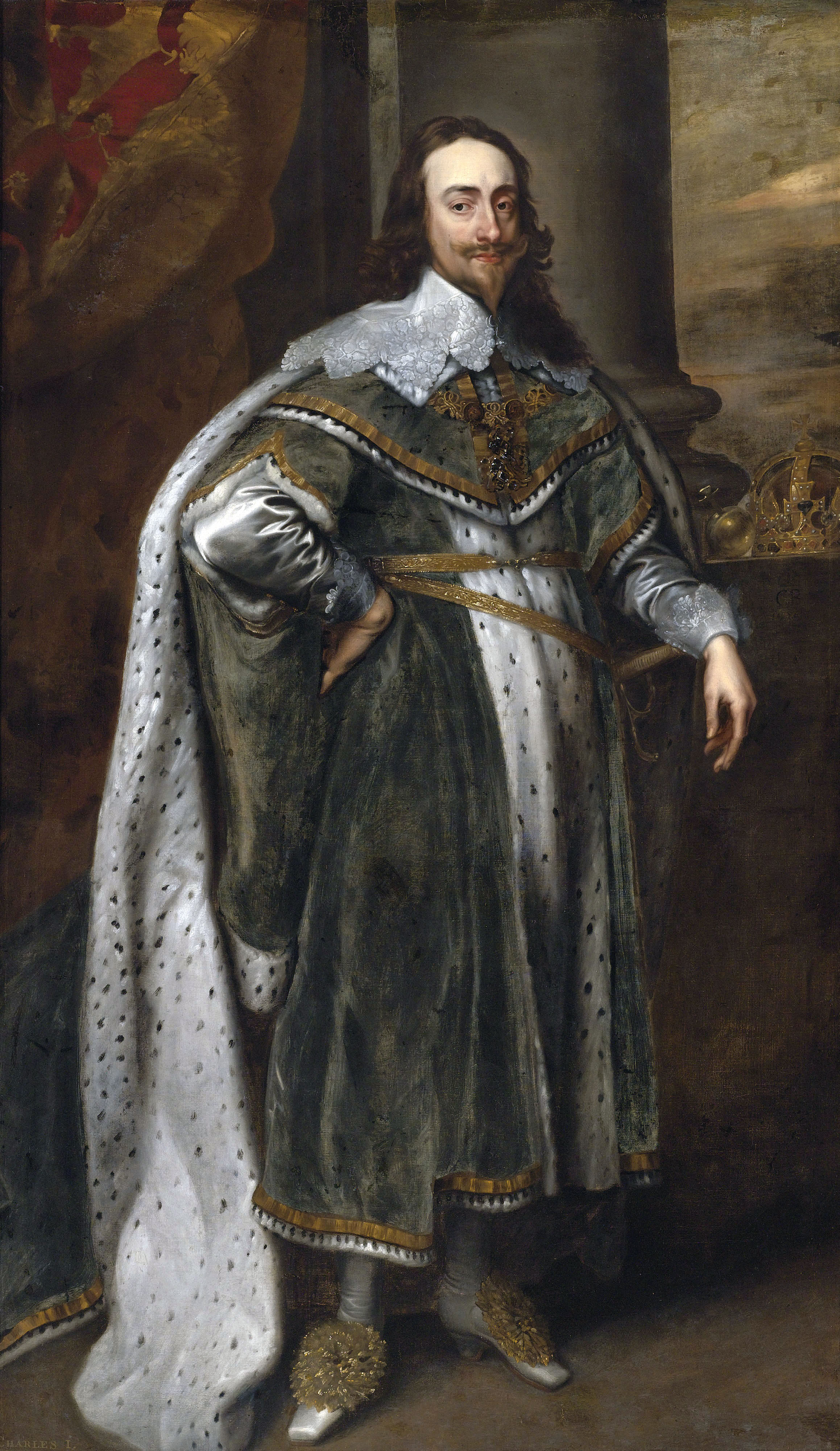
Charles I of England

- January 1 – Friedrich Spanheim, Calvinistic theology professor at the University of Leiden (d. 1649)
- January 17 – Pedro Calderón de la Barca, Spanish playwright (d. 1681)
- January 22 – Elisabet Juliana Banér, Swedish noble (d. 1640)
- January 23 – Alexander Keirincx, Flemish painter (d. 1652)
- January 28 – Pope Clement IX (d. 1669)
- February – Edmund Calamy the Elder, English Presbyterian (d. 1666)
- February 1 – Johan Evertsen, Dutch admiral (d. 1666)
- February 2 – Gabriel Naudé, French librarian and scholar (d. 1653)
- February 6 – Matthew Brend, English landowner (d. 1659)
- February 9 – Jean-Joseph Surin, French Jesuit writer (d. 1665)
- February 24 – Manuel António of Portugal, Dutch-Portuguese nobleman (d. 1666)
- February 26 – Matsudaira Norinaga, Japanese daimyō (d. 1654)
- March 3
  - George Ghica, Prince of Wallachia (d. 1664)
  - Robert Roberthin, German poet (d. 1648)
- March 19 – Anders Bille, Danish general (d. 1657)
- March 26 – Matthew Marvin, Sr., Connecticut settler (d. 1678)
- April 11 – Jacques Buteux, French missionary (d. 1652)
- April 13 – Duke Johann Wilhelm of Saxe-Altenburg, colonel in the Saxon Army (d. 1632)
- April 22 – Alessandro dal Borro, Austrian field marshal (d. 1656)
- May 25 – Thomas Hamilton, 2nd Earl of Haddington, Scottish noble (d. 1640)
- May 31 – Empress Xiaoduanwen of the Qing Dynasty (d. 1649)
- June 26
  - Sir Richard Grenville, 1st Baronet, English Royalist leader (baptised; d. 1658)
  - Juan de Palafox y Mendoza, Spanish politician, clergyman (d. 1659)
- June 29 – Maria Maddalena de' Medici, Italian princess (d. 1633)

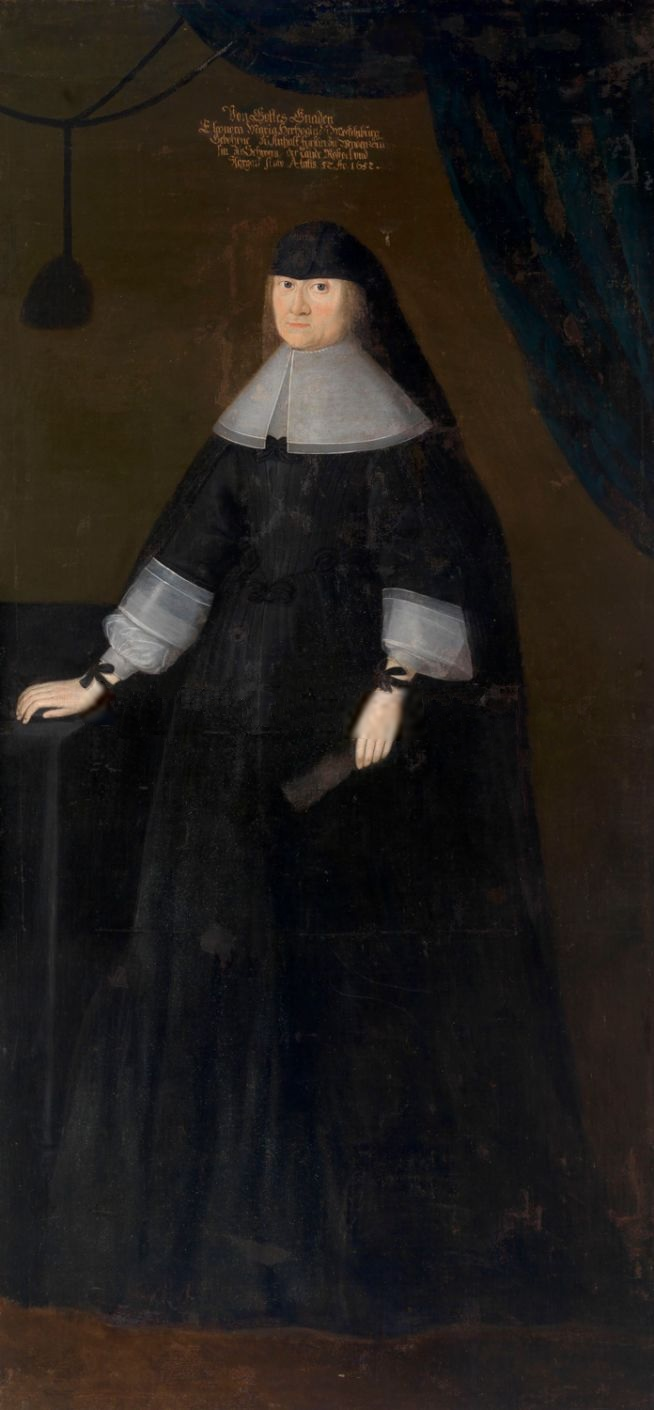
Eleonore Marie of Anhalt-Bernburg

- July 1 – George Gobat, French theologian (d. 1679)
- July 15 – Jan Cossiers, Flemish painter (d. 1671)
- July 20 – Sir Edward Acton, 1st Baronet, Sheriff of Shropshire (d. 1659)
- July 22
  - Sir Hugh Cholmeley, 1st Baronet, English politician (d. 1657)
  - Michel de Marolles, French translator and churchman (d. 1681)
- August 7 – Eleonore Marie of Anhalt-Bernburg, Duchess consort of Mecklenburg-Güstrow (d. 1657)
- August 16 – Maria Celeste, Italian nun, daughter of Galileo Galilei (d. 1634)
- August 24 – Antoine de Laloubère, French Jesuit mathematician (d. 1664)
- August 29 – John Stawell, English Member of Parliament and governor of Taunton (d. 1662)
- September 5 – Loreto Vittori, Italian singer and composer (d. 1670)
- September 19
  - Hermann Busenbaum, German Jesuit theologian (d. 1668)
  - John Frederick, Duke of Saxe-Weimar (d. 1628)
- September 29 – Sir Thomas Aston, 1st Baronet, English politician (d. 1645)
- September 30 – Francis Bacon, English politician and Ipswich MP (d. 1663)
- October 1 – Dirk Graswinckel, Dutch jurist (d. 1666)
- October 2 – Petronio Veroni, Roman Catholic prelate, Bishop of Boiano (1652–1653) (d. 1653)
- October 4 – Giovanni Paolo Oliva, Italian Jesuit (d. 1681)
- November – John Ogilby, English writer and cartographer (d. 1676)
- November 15 – Aniello Falcone, Italian Baroque painter (d. 1665)
- November 19
  - Lieuwe van Aitzema, Dutch historian and statesman (d. 1669)
  - Charles I, King of England, Scotland and Ireland (d. 1649)
- December 12 – Denis of the Nativity, French sailor and cartographer (d. 1638)
- December 14 – Anna Magdalene of Hanau, German countess (d. 1673)
- December 15 – Selius Marselis, Dutch/Norwegian tradesman (d. 1663)
- December 20 – Nicolas Sanson, French cartographer (d. 1667)
- December – Marie de Rohan, French courtier and political activist (d. 1679)
- Marin le Roy de Gomberville, French poet and novelist (d. 1674)
- Anna Alojza Ostrogska, Polish noblewoman (d. 1654)
- William Prynne, English Puritan politician (d. 1669)
- Brian Walton, English bishop and scholar (d. 1661)
- Martine Bertereau, French mineralogist
- Jonas Bronck, Swedish colonist in America (d. 1643)
- Dud Dudley, first Englishman to smelt iron ore with coke (d. 1684)
- Piaras Feiritéar, Irish language poet (d. 1653)
- Samuel Hartlib, British scholar (d. 1662)
- Claude Lorrain, French Baroque painter, draughtsman and engraver (d. 1682)
- Samuel Rutherford, Scottish theologian and controversialist (d. 1660)

1601

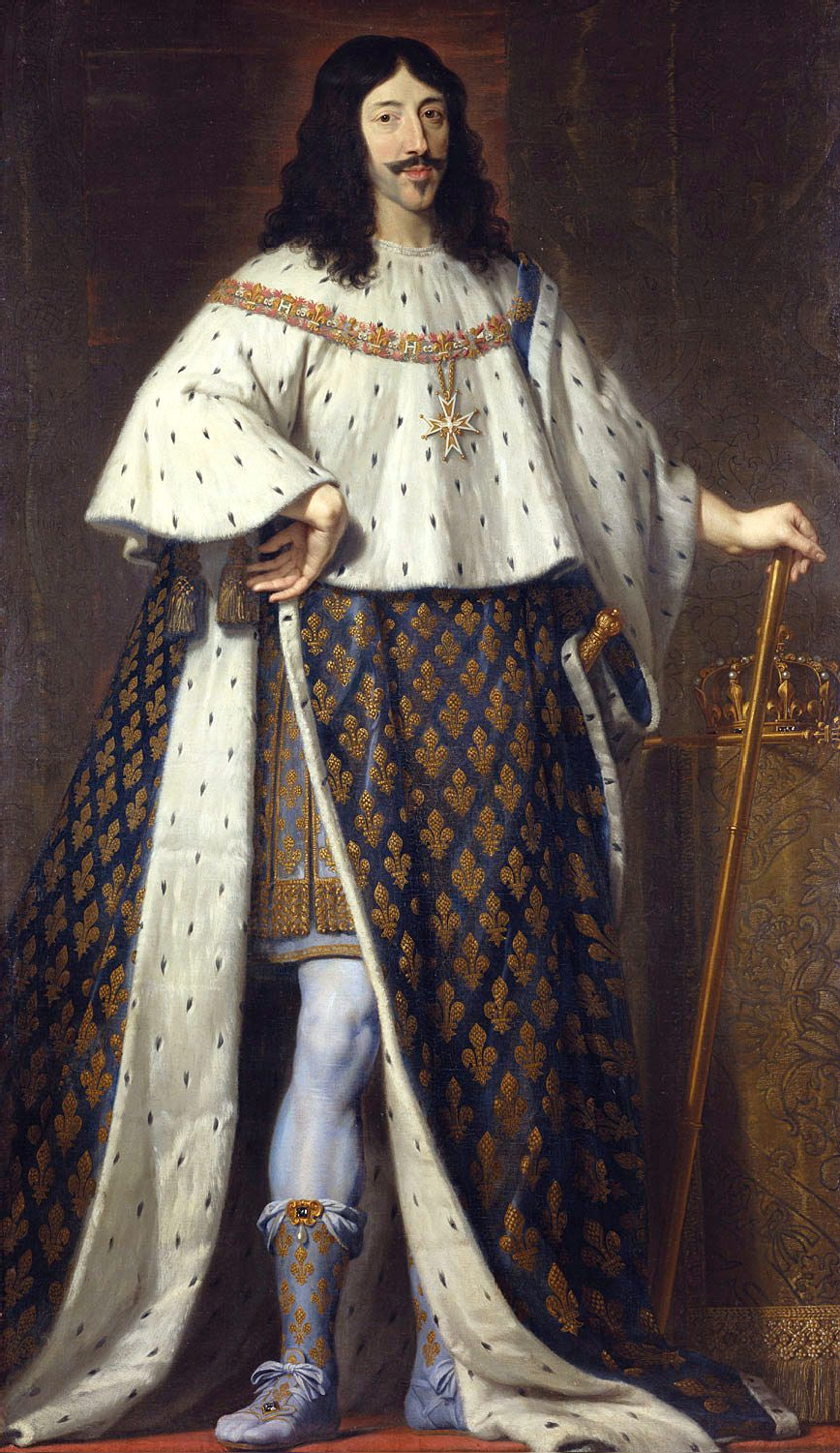
Louis XIII

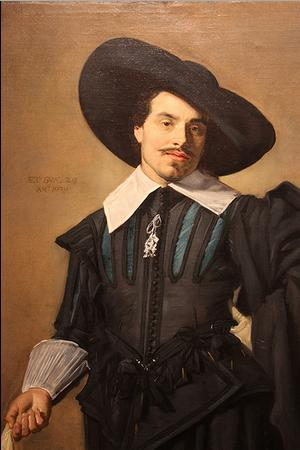
Cornelis Coning

- January 8 – Baltasar Gracián y Morales, Spanish prose writer (d. 1658)
- January 19 – Guido Cagnacci, Italian painter (d. 1663)
- February 4 – Shi Kefa, Chinese Ming Dynasty official (d. 1645)
- February 21 – Carolus Mulerius, Dutch Hispanist (d. 1638)
- February 22 – Pierre Chanut, French diplomat (d. 1662)
- March 7 – Johann Michael Moscherosch, German statesman, satirist (d. 1669)
- March 19 – Alonzo Cano, Spanish painter (d. 1667)
- March 20 – Henri, Count of Harcourt (d. 1666)
- March 22 – John Scudamore, 1st Viscount Scudamore, English politician and Viscount (d. 1671)
- March 31 – Jakov Mikalja, Italian linguist and lexicographer (d. 1654)
- May – Spencer Compton, 2nd Earl of Northampton (d. 1643)
- May 3 – Nathaniel Dickinson, American settler (d. 1676)
- May 27 – Antoine Daniel, Jesuit missionary at Sainte-Marie among the Hurons (d. 1648)
- June 5 – John Trapp, English theologian (d. 1669)
- June 6 – Hendrick Bloemaert, Dutch painter (d. 1672)
- June 21 – Godfrey Henschen, Jesuit hagiographer (d. 1681)
- June 23 – Anna Maria of Ostfriesland, German noblewoman (d. 1634)
- June 26 – Dorothea of Saxe-Altenburg, Duchess consort of Saxe-Eisenach (d. 1675)
- July 17 – Emmanuel Maignan, French physicist and theologian (d. 1676)
- July 18 – Philip I, Count of Schaumburg-Lippe (1640–1681) (d. 1681)
- July 20 – Robert Wallop, English politician (d. 1667)
- July 23 – János Szalárdi, Hungarian historian (d. 1666)
- July 30
  - Anne Eleonore of Hesse-Darmstadt, Duchess of Brunswick-Lüneburg by marriage (d. 1659)
  - Richard Onslow, English MP (d. 1664)
- August 9 – Matthias Sention, Sr., Connecticut settler (d. 1669)
- August 11 – John Evelyn, English politician (d. 1685)
- August 15 – John Campanius, Swedish Lutheran minister in New Sweden (d. 1683)
- August 22 – Georges de Scudéry, French novelist, dramatist and poet (d. 1667)
- September 13
  - Axel Urup, Danish general (d. 1671)
  - Jan Brueghel the Younger, Flemish painter (d. 1678)
- September 22 – Anne of Austria, queen of Louis XIII and regent of France (d. 1666)
- September 27 – King Louis XIII of France (d. 1643)
- October 7 – Florimond de Beaune, French mathematician and jurist (d. 1652)
- October 9 – Fra Bonaventura Bisi, Italian painter (d. 1659)
- October 24 – Alvise Contarini, Doge of Venice (d. 1684)
- October 25 – John Frederick, Lord Mayor of London (d. 1685)
- October 26 – Jan Reynst, Dutch art collector (d. 1646)
- November 3 – Henri, Duke of Verneuil, French bishop (d. 1682)
- November 14 – John Eudes, French missionary (d. 1680)
- November 15 – Cecco Bravo, Italian painter (d. 1661)
- December 25 – Ernest I, Duke of Saxe-Gotha (1640–1675) and Saxe-Altenburg (1672–1675) (d. 1675)
- William Coddington, first governor of Rhode Island (d. 1678)
- Catherine Lepère, French midwife and abortion provider (k. 1679)
- Jacques Gaffarel, French librarian and astrologer (d. 1681)
- Cornelis Coning, Dutch engraver and mayor of Haarlem (d. 1671)
- William Brooke, 12th Baron Cobham, English politician (d. 1643)
- Adrian Scrope, English regicide (d. 1660)
- Rose of Turaida, famous Latvian murder victim (d. 1620)
- François Tristan l'Hermite, French dramatist (d. 1655)
- Edward Somerset, 2nd Marquess of Worcester (d. 1667)

1602

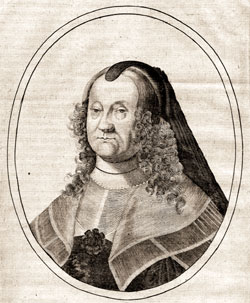
Countess Amalie Elisabeth of Hanau-Münzenberg born 29 January

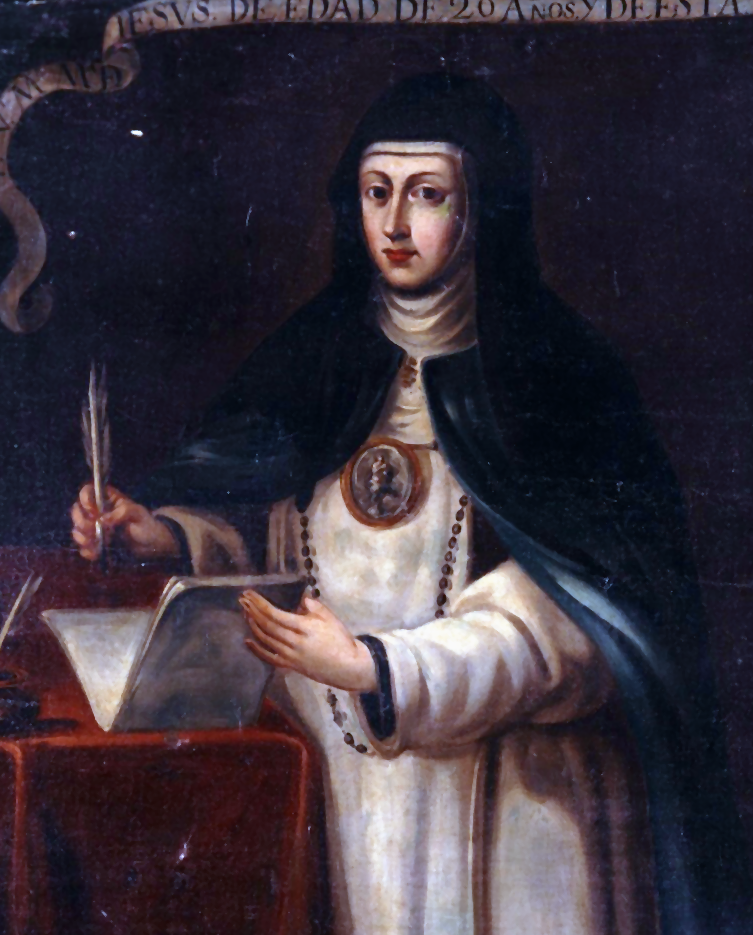
Mary of Jesus of Ágreda born 2 April

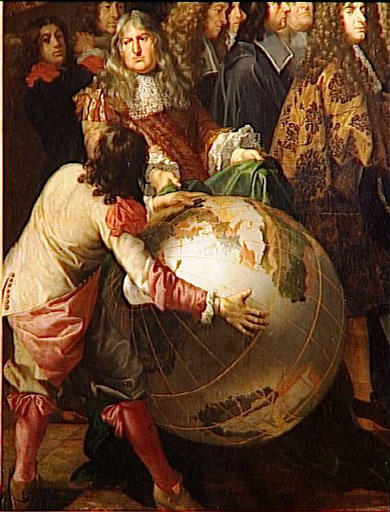
Gilles de Roberval born 10 August

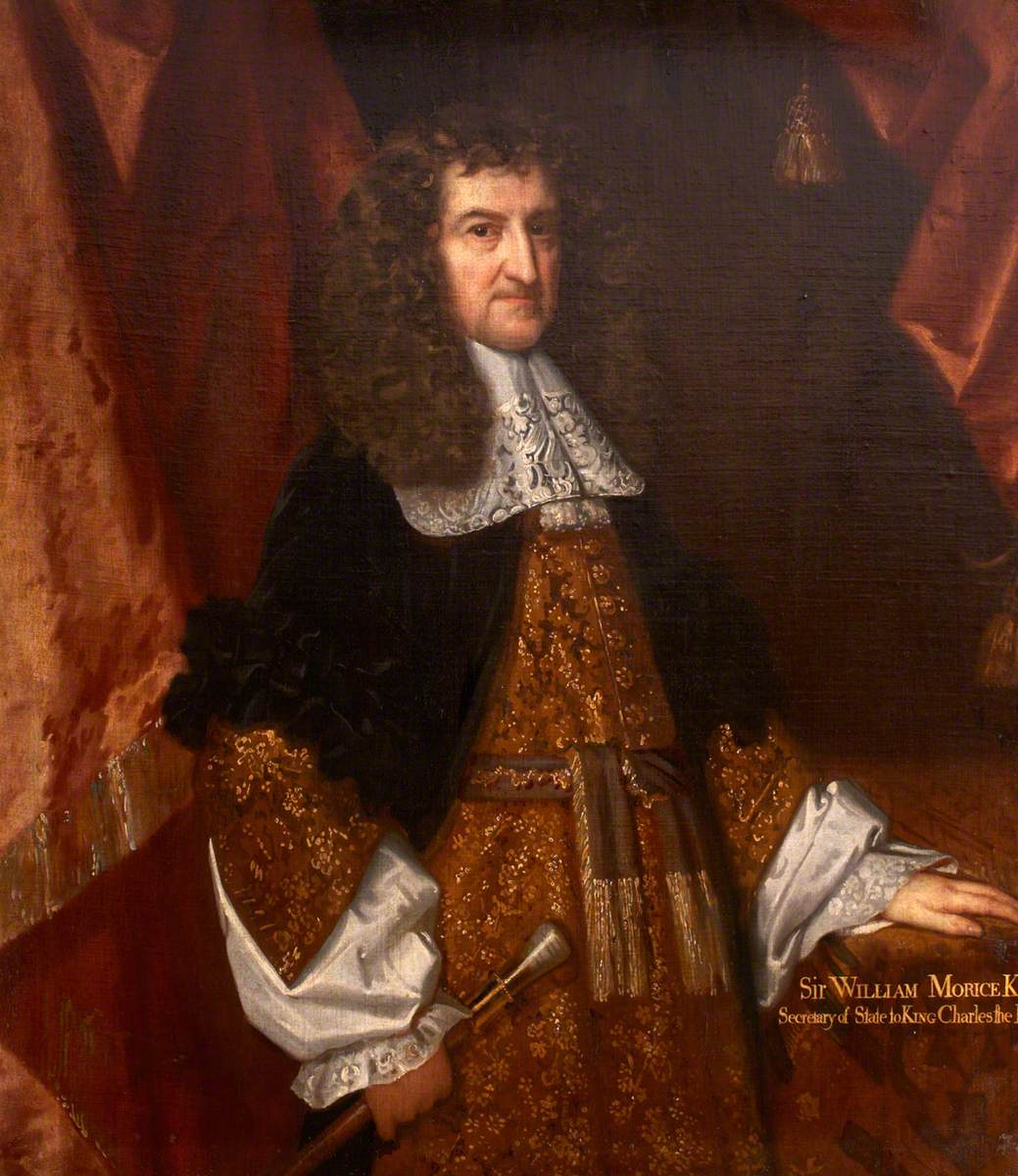
William Morice (Secretary of State) born 6 November

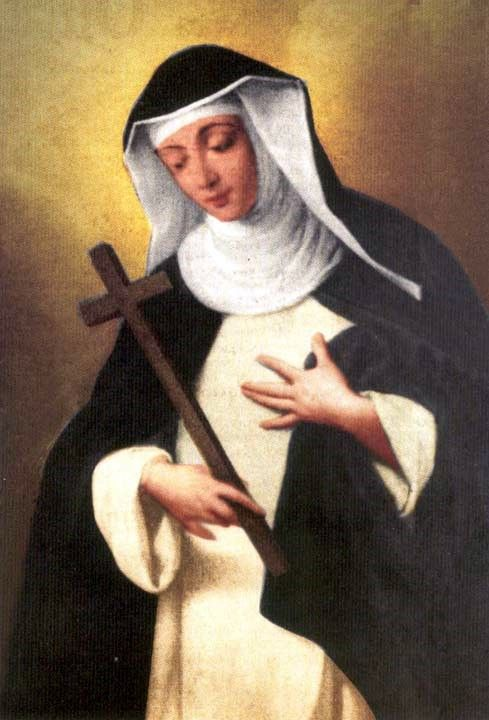
Agnes of Jesus born 17 November

- January 2
  - Rodrigo Ponce de León, 4th Duke of Arcos, Spanish noble (d. 1658)
  - Sir Thomas Twisden, 1st Baronet, English politician (d. 1683)
- January 14 – Sir Henry Slingsby, 1st Baronet, English baronet (d. 1658)
- January 18 – Robert Stuart, Duke of Kintyre and Lorne, fifth child of James VI of Scots and Anne of Denmark (d. 1602)
- January 19 – Anna Maria Antigó, Spanish Catholic nun (d. 1676)
- January 24 – Mildmay Fane, 2nd Earl of Westmorland, English politician (d. 1666)
- January 29 – Countess Amalie Elisabeth of Hanau-Münzenberg, Regent of Hesse-Kassel (1637–1650) (d. 1651)
- January 31 – Adam Billaut, French poet, carpenter (d. 1662)
- February 2 – Jeanne des Anges, French Ursuline nun in Loudun (d. 1665)
- February 12 – Michelangelo Cerquozzi, Italian painter (d. 1660)
- February 13 – William V, Landgrave of Hesse-Kassel (d. 1637)
- February 14 – Francesco Cavalli, Italian composer of the early Baroque period (d. 1676)
- February 16 – Eleonore Dorothea of Anhalt-Dessau, Duchess of Saxe-Weimar by marriage (d. 1664)
- February 18
  - Pieter Meulener, Flemish Baroque painter (d. 1654)
  - Per Brahe the Younger, Swedish soldier and statesman (d. 1680)
- March 12 – Juan Velez, Spanish Catholic prelate who was appointed Bishop of Cebu (d. 1661)
- March 18 – Jacques de Billy, French Jesuit mathematician (d. 1679)
- March 24 – Edward Leigh, English writer (d. 1671)
- March 27 – Sir Christopher Yelverton, 1st Baronet, English politician (d. 1654)
- March 29
  - John Arrowsmith, English theologian and academic (d. 1659)
  - John Lightfoot, English churchman and rabbinical scholar (d. 1675)
- April – William Lawes, English composer and musician (d. 1645)
- April 2 – Mary of Jesus of Ágreda, Franciscan abbess and spiritual writer (d. 1665)
- April 12 – Daniel Knudsen Bildt, Dano-Norwegian military officer and large estate owner in Norway (d. 1651)
- April 28 – Tokugawa Yorinobu, Japanese nobleman (d. 1671)
- April 30 – Robert Baillie, Scottish divine and historical writer (d. 1662)
- May 1 – William Lilly, English astrologer (d. 1681)
- May 2 – Athanasius Kircher, German scholar (d. 1680)
- May 10 – Samuel Newman, colonial Massachusetts clergyman (d. 1663)
- May 12 – Dorothea Augusta of Schleswig-Holstein-Gottorp, German duchess (d. 1682)
- May 26 – Philippe de Champaigne, French painter (d. 1674)
- June 2 – Rudolf Christian, Count of East Frisia, ruler of East Frisia in the early years of the Thirty Years' War (d. 1628)
- July 8 – François Perrochel, French cleric (d. 1682)
- July 9 – Maeda Gen'i, Japanese Buddhist priest
- July 14 – Cardinal Mazarin, French statesman (d. 1661)
- July 15 – John Bradshaw, English judge and regicide (d. 1659)
- July 18 – Samuel Stone, Connecticut Puritan minister (d. 1663)
- July 26 – Ana de los Angeles Monteagudo, Peruvian nun (d. 1686)
- August 10 – Gilles de Roberval, French mathematician (d. 1675)
- August 23 – Sir John Marsham, 1st Baronet, English politician (d. 1685)
- August 31 – Amalia of Solms-Braunfels, Princess consort to Frederick Henry (d. 1675)
- September 1 – Peregrine Hoby, English politician (d. 1679)
- September 17 – Sir Richard Newdigate, 1st Baronet, English politician (d. 1678)
- September 29 – Algernon Percy, 10th Earl of Northumberland, English military leader (d. 1668)
- October 3 – Arnold Braemes, English politician (d. 1681)
- October 9 – Robert Caesar, English politician (d. 1637)
- October 12 – William Chillingworth, controversial English churchman (d. 1644)
- November 6 – William Morice, English politician (d. 1676)
- November 17 – Agnes of Jesus, French Catholic nun (d. 1634)
- November 20 – Otto von Guericke, German inventor and Mayor of Magdeburg (d. 1686)
- November 22 – Elisabeth of France, queen of Philip IV of Spain (d. 1644)
- November 23 – Louis Philip, Count Palatine of Simmern-Kaiserslautern, Prince of Paltinate (d. 1655)
- November 27 – Chiara Margarita Cozzolani, Italian abbess and composer (d. 1670)
- December 4 – Johann Hülsemann, German theologian (d. 1661)
- December 7
  - Anne Holck, Danish noble and war heroine (d. 1660)
  - Bartholomew Mastrius, Italian theologian (d. 1673)
- December 18 – Simonds d'Ewes, English antiquarian and politician (d. 1650)
- December 26 – Sir Norton Knatchbull, 1st Baronet, English politician (d. 1685)
- John Berkeley, 1st Baron Berkeley of Stratton (d. 1678)
- Caesar, duc de Choiseul, French marshal and diplomat (d. 1675)
- John Greaves, English mathematician and antiquary (d. 1652)
- Jean-Baptiste Budes, Comte de Guébriant, marshal of France (d. 1643)
- Edward Montagu, 2nd Earl of Manchester, English soldier (d. 1671)
- Henry Marten, English lawyer, politician and regicide (d. 1680)
- Theodorus Moretus, Flemish mathematician (d. 1667)
- Nectarius of Jerusalem, Orthodox Patriarch of Jerusalem (d. 1676)
- Dudley North, 4th Baron North, English politician (d. 1677)
- Katarzyna Ostrogska, Polish noblewoman (d. 1642)
- Antoine de l'Age, duc de Puylaurens, French courtier (d. 1635)
- Eleonora Ramirez di Montalvo, Italian educator (d. 1659)
- Owen Feltham, English religious writer (d. 1668)
- Richard Óge Martyn, Irish politician (d. 1648)
- Salomon van Ruysdael, Dutch landscape painter (d. 1670)

1603

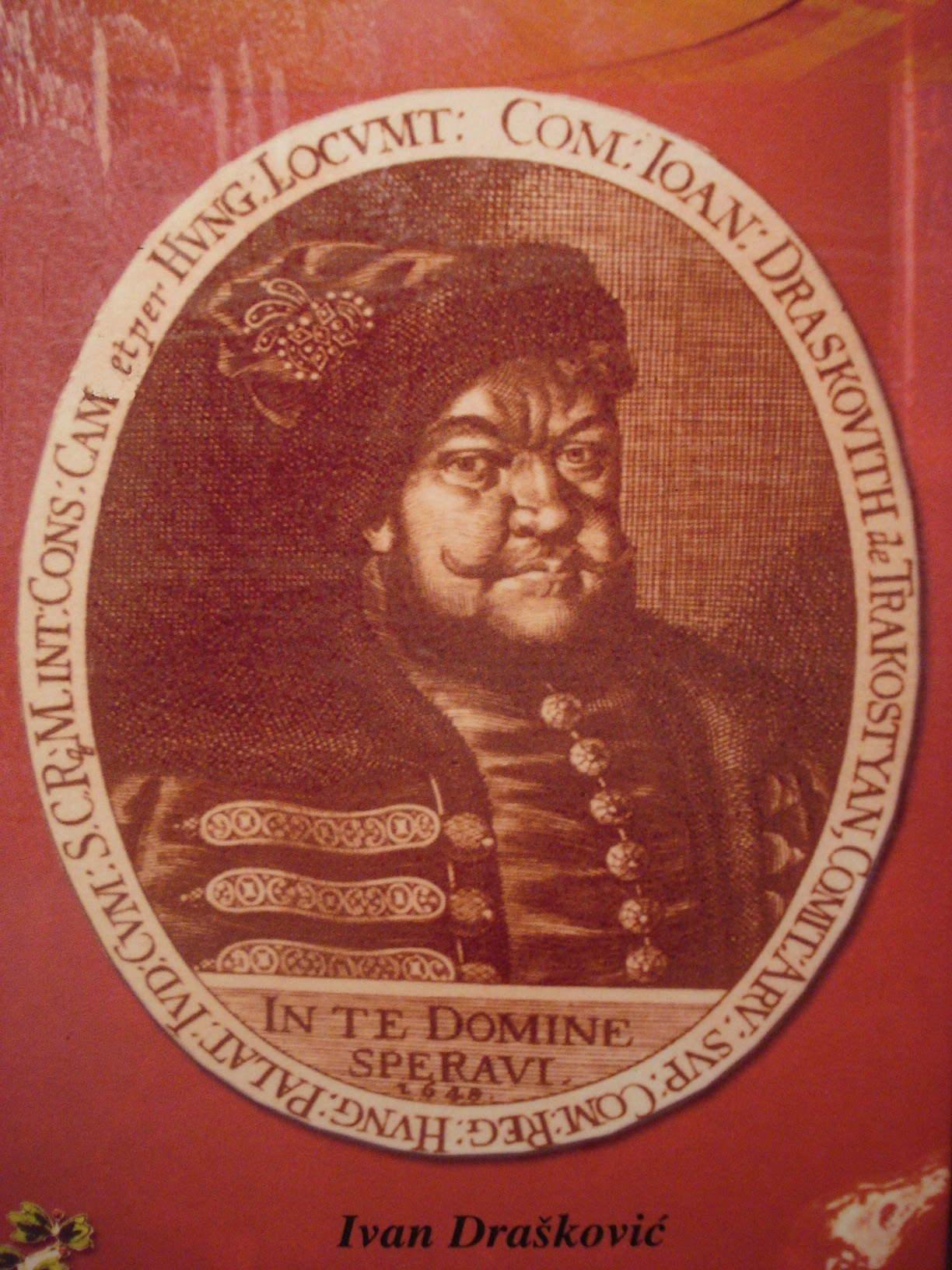
Ivan III Drašković

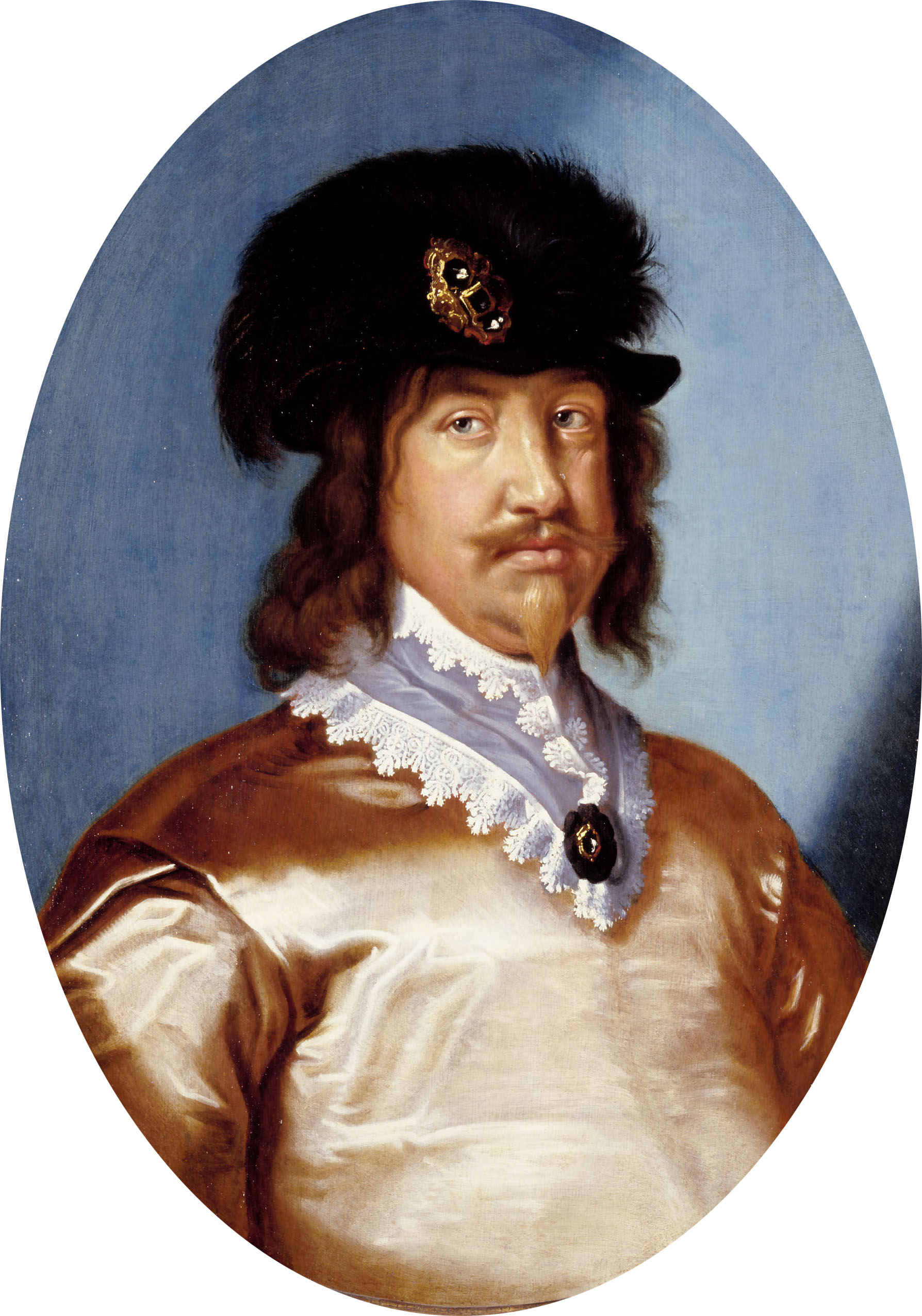
Christian, Prince-Elect of Denmark

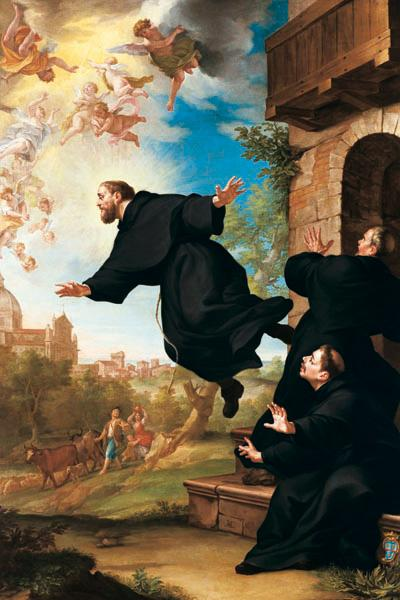
Joseph of Cupertino

- January 3 – Paul Stockmann, German hymnwriter (d. 1636)
- January 27
  - Sir Harbottle Grimston, 2nd Baronet, English lawyer and politician, Speaker in 1660 (d. 1685)
  - Humphrey Mackworth, English politician, lawyer and judge (d. 1654)
- January 30 – David Denicke, German jurist and hymnwriter (d. 1680)
- January – Shackerley Marmion, English dramatist (d. 1639)
- February 2 – Louise de Bourbon, French noble (d. 1637)
- February 7 – Friederich Stellwagen, German organ builder (d. 1660)
- February 12 – Friedrich Wilhelm II, Duke of Saxe-Altenburg (1639–1669) (d. 1669)
- March 2 – Pietro Novelli, Italian painter (d. 1647)
- March 13 – Ivan III Drašković, Croatian nobleman and soldier (d. 1648)
- March 18 – Simon Bradstreet, English colonial magistrate (d. 1697)
- March 21 bapt. – Samuel Luke, English politician (d. 1670)
- April 6 – Simon Paulli, Danish physician (d. 1680)
- April 10 – Christian, Prince-Elect of Denmark (d. 1647)
- April 19 – Michel le Tellier, French statesman (d. 1685)
- April 21 – Chamaraja Wodeyar VI, King of Mysore (d. 1637)
- April 24 – Thomas Allen, English politician (d. 1681)
- May 18 – Herbert Croft, English churchman (d. 1691)
- June 3 – Pietro Paolini, Italian painter (d. 1681)
- June 17 – Joseph of Cupertino, Italian saint (d. 1663)
- June 24 – Maria Overlander van Purmerland, Dutch noble (d. 1678)
- July 11
  - Sibylle Christine of Anhalt-Dessau, Princess of Anhalt-Dessau (d. 1686)
  - Kenelm Digby, English privateer and alchemist (d. 1665)
- July 12 – Edward Benlowes, English poet (d. 1676)
- July 23 – Axel Lillie, Swedish soldier and politician (d. 1662)
- July 27 – Alonso de Ovalle, Chilean priest and historian (d. 1651)
- August 9 – Johannes Cocceius, Dutch theologian (d. 1669)
- August 17 – Lennart Torstensson, Swedish Field Marshal, Privy Councillour and Governor-General (d. 1651)
- August 24 – Abu al-Ghazi Bahadur, Khan of Khiva, historian (d. 1663)
- September 10 – Henri Valois, French historian (d. 1676)
- September 14 – John Vaughan, Welsh judge (d. 1674)
- September 15 – Tokugawa Yorifusa, Japanese nobleman (d. 1661)
- October 2 – Sir John Yonge, 1st Baronet, English politician (d. 1663)
- October 20 – Simon de Vos, Flemish painter (d. 1676)
- November 10 – Agneta de Graeff van Polsbroek, Dutch noble (d. 1656)
- November 16 – Augustyn Kordecki, Polish prior of the Jasna Góra Monastery (d. 1673)
- November 24 – John, Count of Nassau-Idstein (1629–1677) (d. 1677)
- December 21
  - Jean de Launoy, French historian (d. 1678)
  - Roger Williams, English theologian and colonist (d. 1684)
- Abel Janszoon Tasman, Dutch seafarer and explorer (d. 1659)
- Louis Abelly, French monk and priest (d. 1691)
- Margareta Brahe, Swedish noble (d. 1669)
- John Ashburnham, English Member of Parliament (d. 1671)
- Daniel Blagrave, English Member of Parliament (d. 1668)
- Valentin Conrart, one of the founders of the Académie française (d. 1675)
- Denis Gaultier, French lutenist and composer (d. 1672)
- Aernout van der Neer, Dutch painter (d. 1677)
- Alexandre de Prouville, French statesman and soldier (d. 1670)
- William Stone, Colonial governor of Maryland (d. c. 1660)

1604

Johann Rudolf Glauber

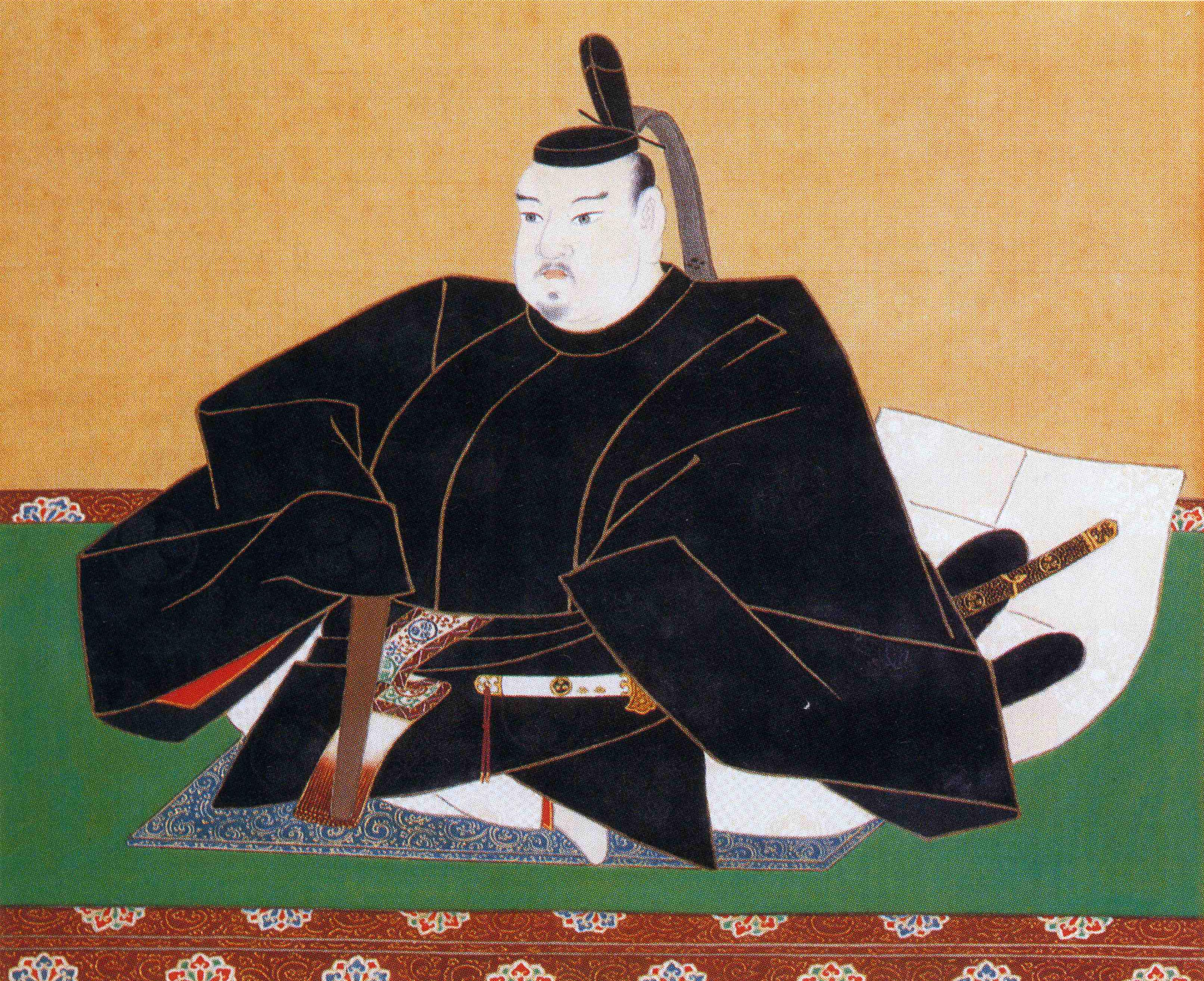
Tokugawa Iemitsu

- January 4 – Jakob Balde, German Latinist (d. 1668)
- February 2 – Juan de Leyva de la Cerda, conde de Baños, Spanish noble (d. 1678)
- February 24 – Arcangela Tarabotti, born Elena Tarabotti, Venetian nun and feminist (d. 1652)
- March 10 – Johann Rudolf Glauber, German-Dutch alchemist and chemist (approximate date; d. 1670)
- March 19 – King John IV of Portugal (d. 1656)
- March 23 – Girolamo Colonna, Catholic cardinal (d. 1666)
- April 5 – Charles IV, Duke of Lorraine (d. 1675)
- April 9 – Duke Francis Henry of Saxe-Lauenburg (d. 1658)
- April 17
  - Giovanni Giacomo Barbelli, Italian painter (d. 1656)
  - Frans Luycx, Flemish Baroque painter (d. 1668)
- April 22 – Peter Venables, Welsh politician (d. 1669)
- April 28 – Joris Jansen Rapelje, Early Dutch settler in colonial North America (d. 1662)
- May 1 – Louis, Count of Soissons (d. 1641)
- May 4 – Sir Hugh Owen, 1st Baronet, English politician (d. 1670)
- May 10 – Jean Mairet, classical French dramatist who wrote both tragedies and comedies (d. 1686)
- May 17 – Vincent Baron, French Dominican theologian writer (d. 1674)
- May 28 – Catherine of Brandenburg, Princess of Transylvania (1629–1630) (d. 1649)
- June 4 – Claudia de' Medici (d. 1648)
- June 10 – John Manners, 8th Earl of Rutland, English politician when he inherited the peerage (d. 1679)
- June 17 – John Maurice, Prince of Nassau-Siegen (d. 1679)
- June 28 – Heinrich Albert, German composer and poet (d. 1651)
- June 30 – Margaret Elisabeth of Leiningen-Westerburg, Regent of Hesse-Homburg (d. 1667)
- July 8 – Christiaen van Couwenbergh, Dutch painter (d. 1667)
- July 25 – Dorothea Diana of Salm, German noblewoman (d. 1672)
- August 4 – François Hédelin, abbé d'Aubignac, French author (d. 1676)
- August 12 – Tokugawa Iemitsu, Japanese shōgun (d. 1651)
- August 16 – Bernhard of Saxe-Weimar, general in the Thirty Years' War (d. 1639)
- August 25 – Shang Kexi, Chinese general (d. 1676)
- September 13 – Sir William Brereton, 1st Baronet, English soldier and politician (d. 1661)
- September 21 – Angelo Michele Colonna, Italian painter (d. 1687)
- October 14 – Nils Brahe, Swedish soldier and younger brother of Per Brahe (d. 1632)
- October 22 – Simon Le Moyne, French missionary (d. 1665)
- October 31
  - Luigi Baccio del Bianco, Italian painter (d. 1657)
  - Krisztina Nyáry, Hungarian noblewoman (d. 1641)
- November 3 – Osman II, Sultan of the Ottoman Empire (d. 1622)
- November 6 – George Ent, English scientist (d. 1689)
- November 7
  - Bernard of Offida, Italian saint (d. 1694)
  - Jacques Leneuf de La Poterie, Politician (d. 1687)
- November 26 – Johannes Bach, German composer and musician (d. 1673)
- December 7 – Ambrose Corbie, English Jesuit teacher (d. 1649)
- December 10 – David Barry, 1st Earl of Barrymore, Irish noble (d. 1642)
- Jasper Mayne, English dramatist (d. 1672)
- Isaac Ambrose, English Puritan divine (d. 1664)
- Menasseh Ben Israel, Jewish Rabbi (d. 1657)
- Giovanni Battista Michelini, Italian painter (d. 1655)
- Edward Pococke, English Orientalist and biblical scholar (d. 1691)
- Abraham Bosse, French engraver and artist (d. 1676)
- Egbert Bartholomeusz Kortenaer, Dutch admiral (d. 1665)

1605

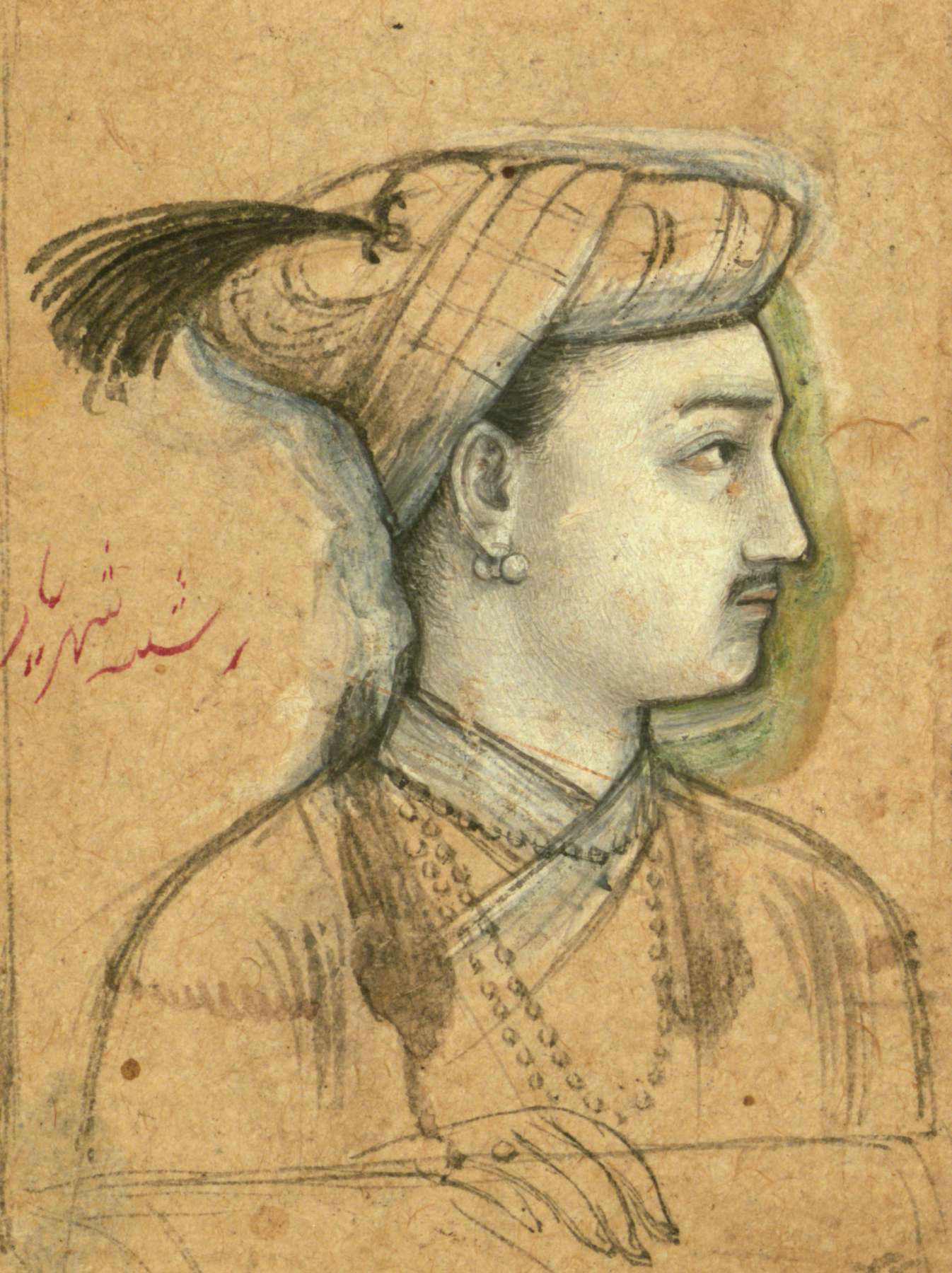
Shahryar

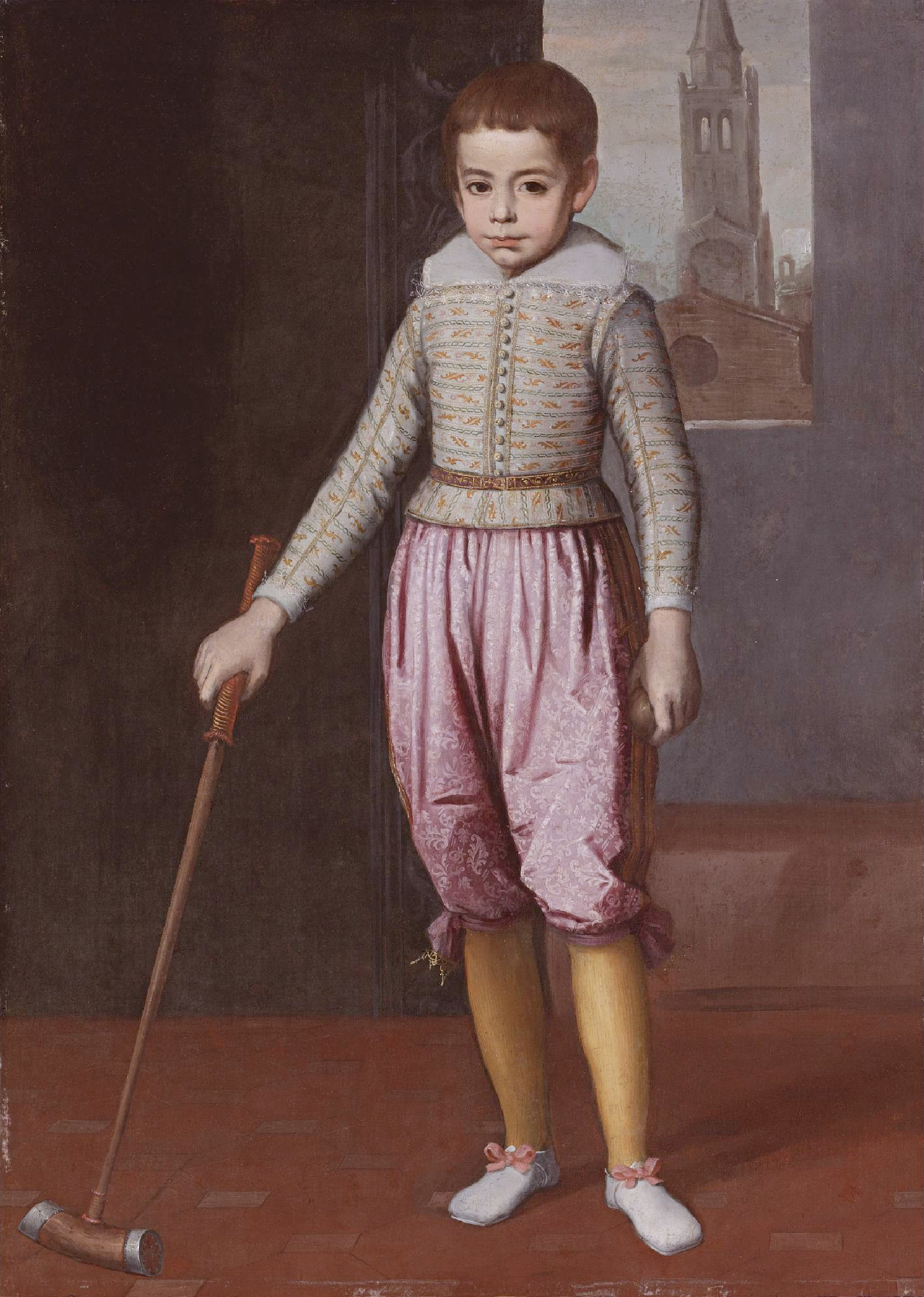
Federico Ubaldo della Rovere, Duke of Urbino

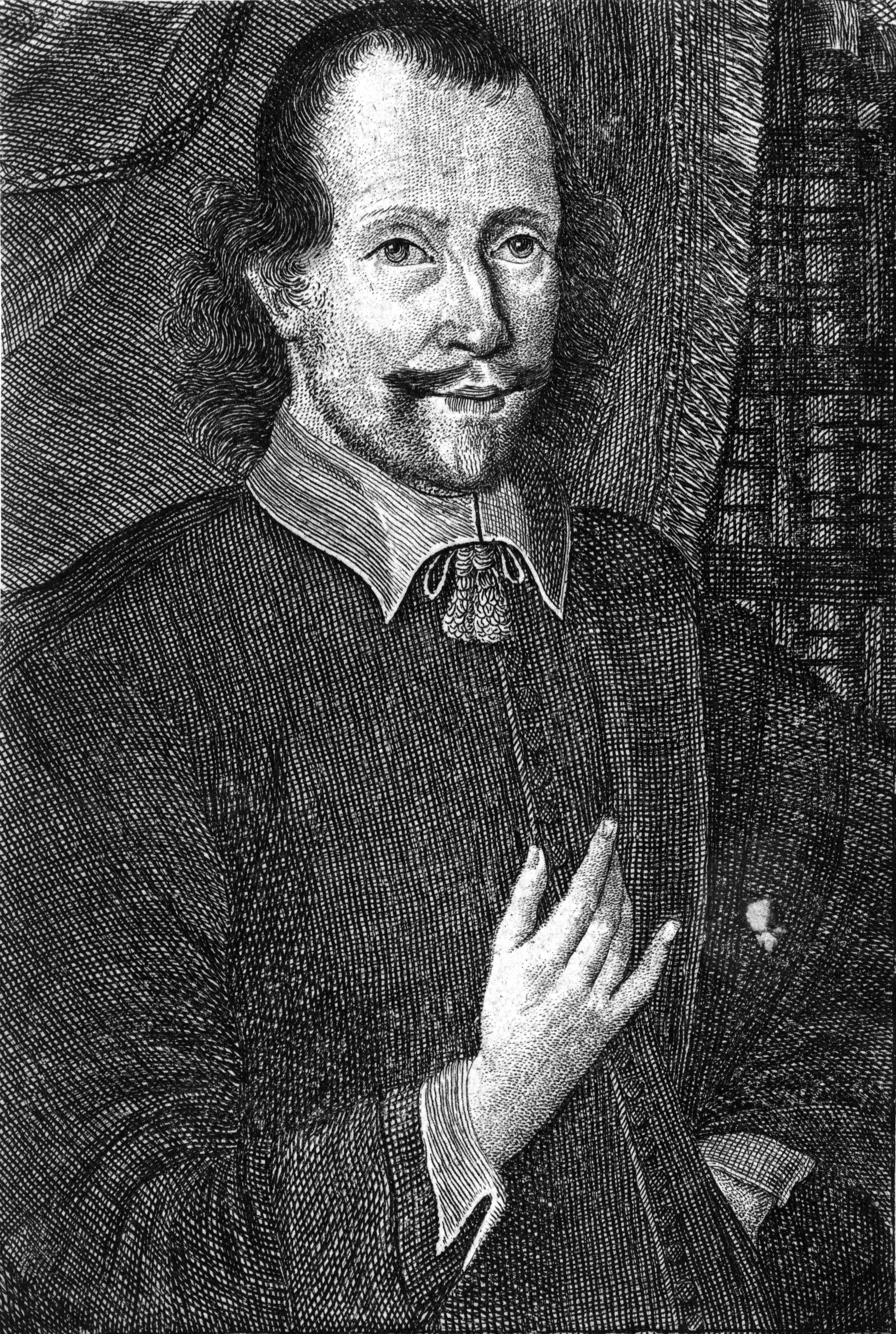
Simon Dach

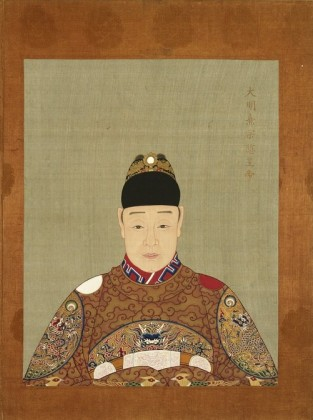
Tianqi Emperor

- January 16 – Shahryar, fifth and youngest son of the Mughal Emperor Jahangir (d. 1628)
- January 17 – Anthony Irby, English politician (d. 1682)
- February 1 – Isaac Aboab da Fonseca, Portuguese Sephardic rabbi (d. 1693)
- February 17 – Luca Ferrari, Italian painter (d. 1654)
- February 18
  - Juan de Almoguera, Roman Catholic prelate who served as Archbishop of Lima (1673–1676) and Bishop of Arequipa (1659–1673) (d. 1676)
  - Abraham Ecchellensis, Lebanese Maronite philosopher (d. 1664)
- February 20 – Sir John Lowther, 1st Baronet, of Lowther, English politician (d. 1675)
- March 1 – James Wriothesley, Lord Wriothesley, English politician (d. 1624)
- March 2 – René Menard, Canadian explorer (d. 1661)
- March 3 – George Horner, English politician (d. 1677)
- March 14 – Francis Davies, Welsh bishop (d. 1675)
- March 17 – George II, Landgrave of Hesse-Darmstadt (1626–1661) (d. 1661)
- April 8
  - King Philip IV of Spain (d. 1665)
  - Mary Stuart, English-Scottish princess (d. 1607)
- April 18 – Giacomo Carissimi, Italian composer (d. 1674)
- April 19 – Orazio Benevoli, Italian composer (d. 1672)
- April 30 – Peder Winstrup, Bishop of Lund (d. 1679)
- May 7 – Patriarch Nikon of Moscow, Patriarch of the Russian Orthodox Church (d. 1681)
- May 16 – Federico Ubaldo della Rovere, Duke of Urbino, Italian noble (d. 1623)
- May 29 – Hendrick van Anthonissen, Dutch painter (d. 1656)
- June 15 – Thomas Randolph, English poet and dramatist (d. 1635)
- June 22 – Andrea Bolgi, Italian sculptor (d. 1656)
- July 6 – Ulrich II, Count of East Frisia, ruler of East Frisia in the later years of the Thirty Years' War (d. 1648)
- July 25 – Theodore Haak, German scholar (d. 1690)
- July 29 – Simon Dach, Prussian German lyrical poet and writer of hymns (d. 1659)
- August 6
  - Johann Philipp von Schönborn, Archbishop-Elector of Mainz (1647– (d. 1673)
  - Bulstrode Whitelocke, English lawyer (d. 1675)
- August 8 – Cecil Calvert, 2nd Baron Baltimore, first Proprietor and Proprietary Governor of the Province of Maryland (d. 1675)
- August 18 – Henry Hammond, English churchman (d. 1660)
- August 25 – Philipp Moritz, Count of Hanau-Münzenberg, German noble (d. 1638)
- August 30 – Felice Ficherelli, Italian painter (d. 1660)
- August 31 – Nicolas Talon, French Jesuit (d. 1691)
- September 1 – Michele Mazzarino, Italian Catholic cardinal (d. 1648)
- September 8 – Cornelis Jan Witsen, Mayor of Amsterdam (d. 1669)
- September 12 – William Dugdale, English antiquary and herald (d. 1686)
- September 14 – Brynjólfur Sveinsson, Icelandic bishop and scholar (d. 1675)
- September 17 – Francesco Sacrati, Italian composer (d. 1650)
- September 24 – Antoine Godeau, French bishop and poet (d. 1672)
- September 28 – Ismaël Bullialdus, French astronomer (d. 1694)
- October 15 – Marie de Bourbon, Duchess of Montpensier, French princess (d. 1627)
- October 16 – Charles Coypeau d'Assoucy, French writer and composer (d. 1677)
- October 19 – Sir Thomas Browne, English physician and philosopher (d. 1682)
- October 22 – Frédéric Maurice de La Tour d'Auvergne, prince of the independent principality of Sedan (d. 1652)
- November 3 – John Henderson, 5th of Fordell, Scottish noble (d. 1650)
- November 4 – William Habington, English poet (d. 1654)
- November 5 – Thomas Shepard, American Puritan minister and a significant figure in early colonial New England (d. 1649)
- December 1 – Roger Hill, English politician (d. 1667)
- December 8 – François Vavasseur, French writer (d. 1681)
- December 16 – Jerome Weston, 2nd Earl of Portland, English diplomat and landowner (d. 1663)
- December 23 – Tianqi Emperor, Ming emperor of China (d. 1627)
- December 25 – Francis Godolphin, English politician (d. 1667)
- William Berkeley, English governor of Virginia (d. 1677)
- Adriaen Brouwer, Flemish painter (d. 1638)
- Aleksander Dominik Kazanowski, Polish nobleman (d. 1648)
- Alexandra Mavrokordatou, Greek intellectual and salonist (d. 1684)
- Afanasy Ordin-Nashchokin, Russian statesman (d. 1680)
- Jean-Baptiste Tavernier, French traveller and pioneer of trade with India (d. 1689)
- Constantia Zierenberg, German-Polish singer (d. 1653)
- Thomas Hastings, American politician (d. 1685)
- Johann Rudolf Stadler, Swiss clock-maker (d. 16 October 1637)
- Ayşe Sultan and/or Gevherhan Sultan, Ottoman princesses, daughters of Ahmed I
- Semyon Dezhnev, Pomor navigator (d. 1672)
- John Gauden, English bishop and writer (d. 1662)
- William Goffe, English parliamentarian and regicide (d. 1679)
- Thomas Nabbes, English dramatist (d. c. 1645)
- Francis Willoughby, 5th Baron Willoughby of Parham, English noble (d. 1666)

1606

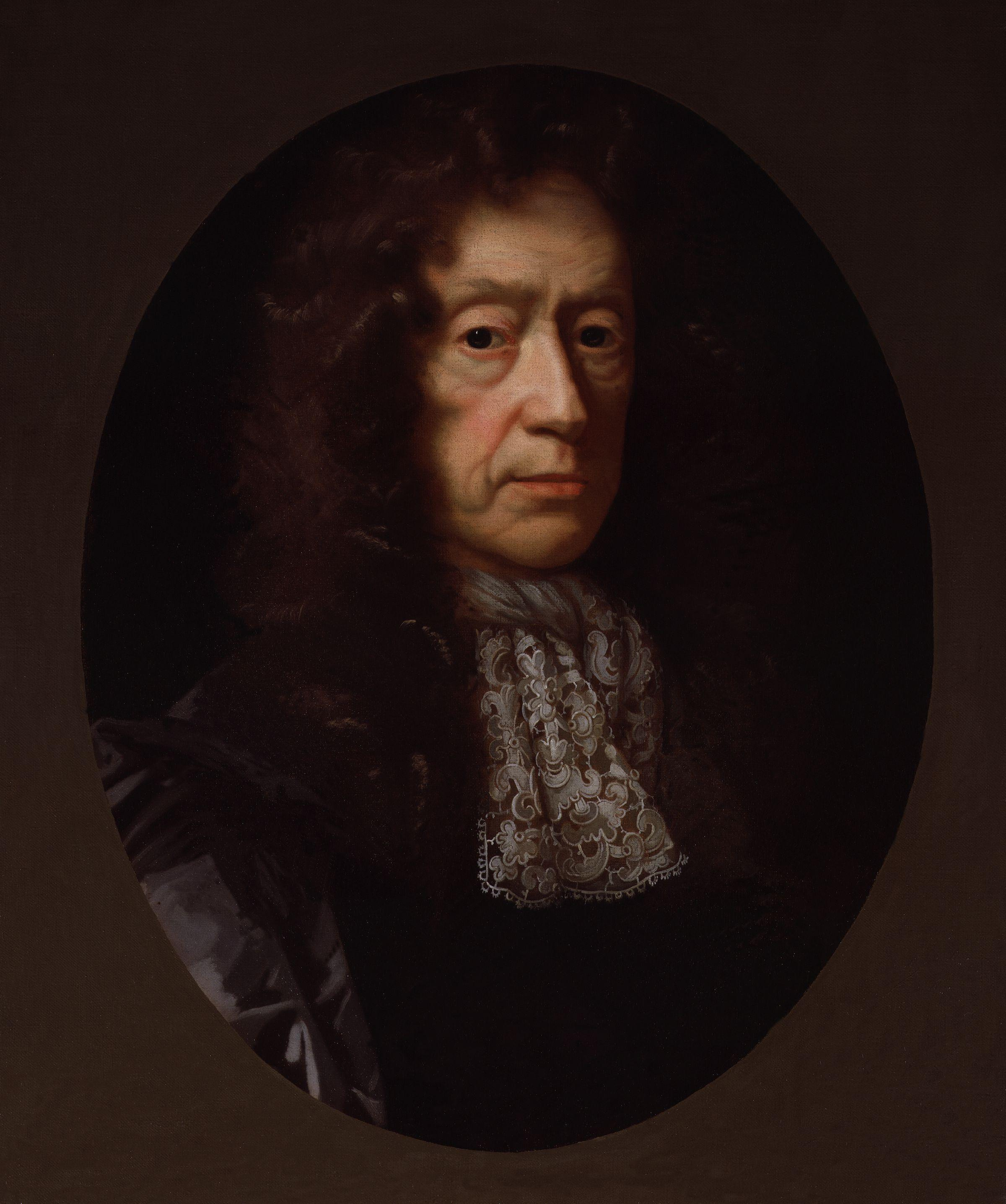
Edmund Waller

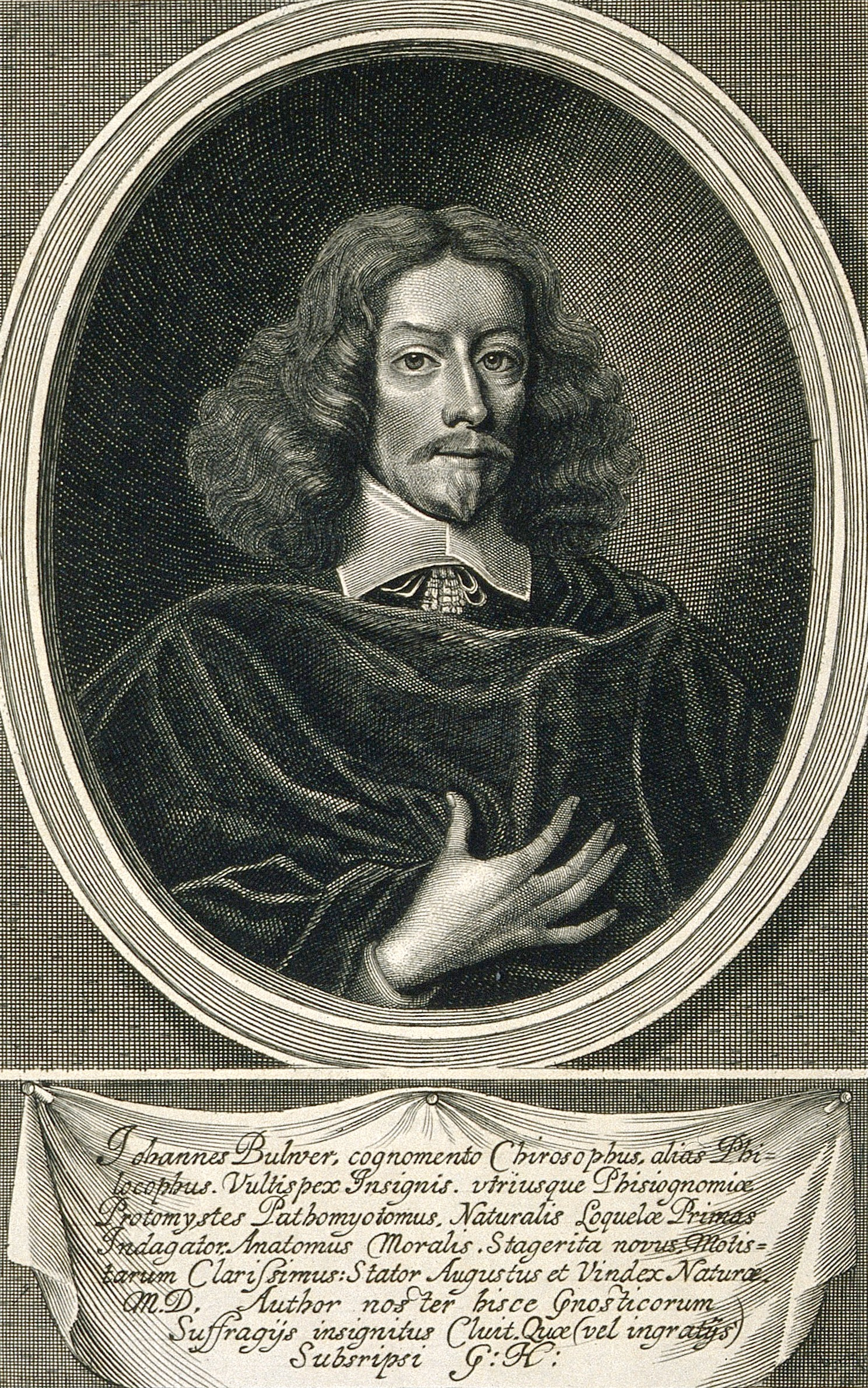
John Bulwer

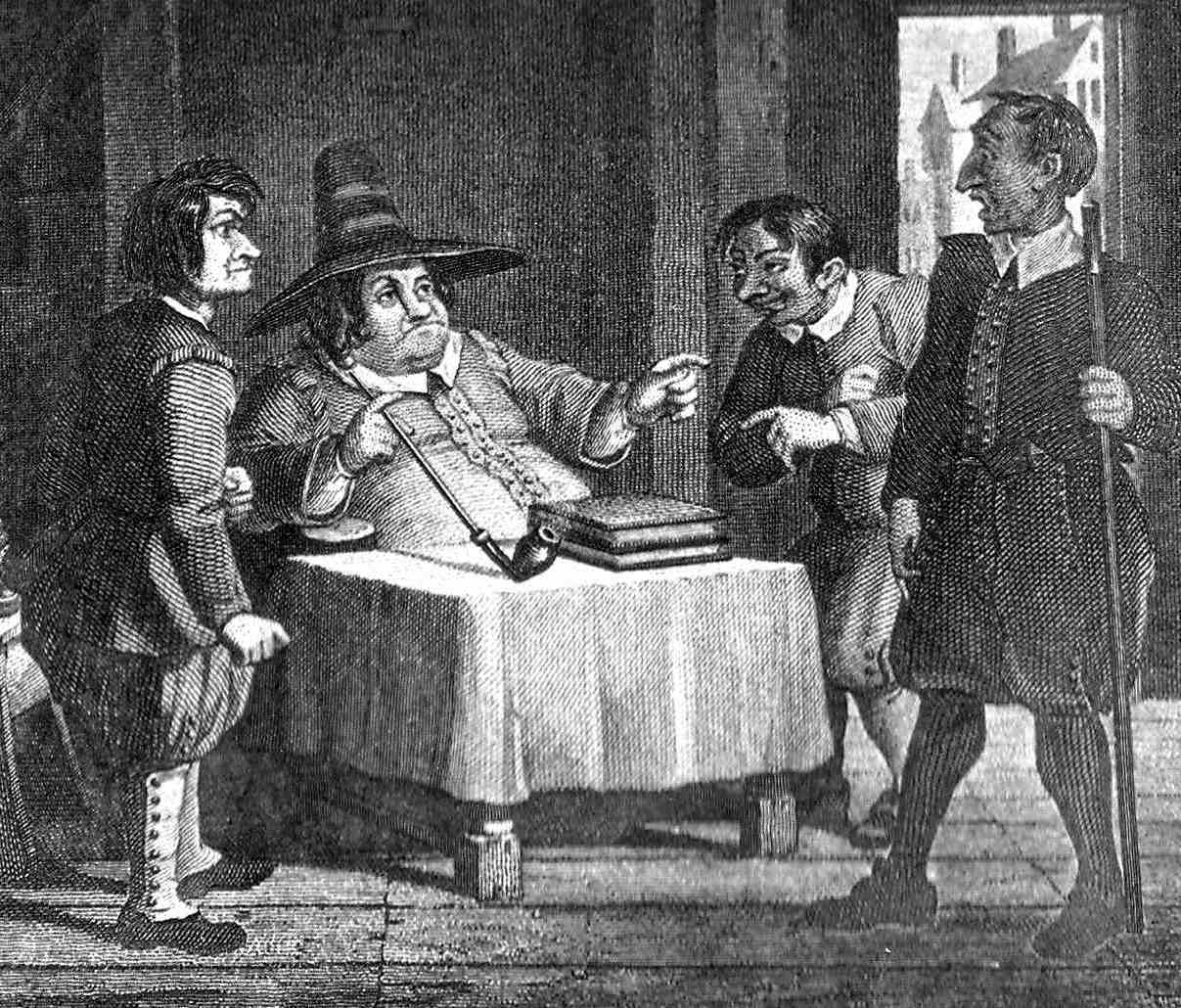
Wouter van Twiller

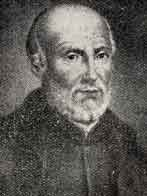
Julian Maunoir

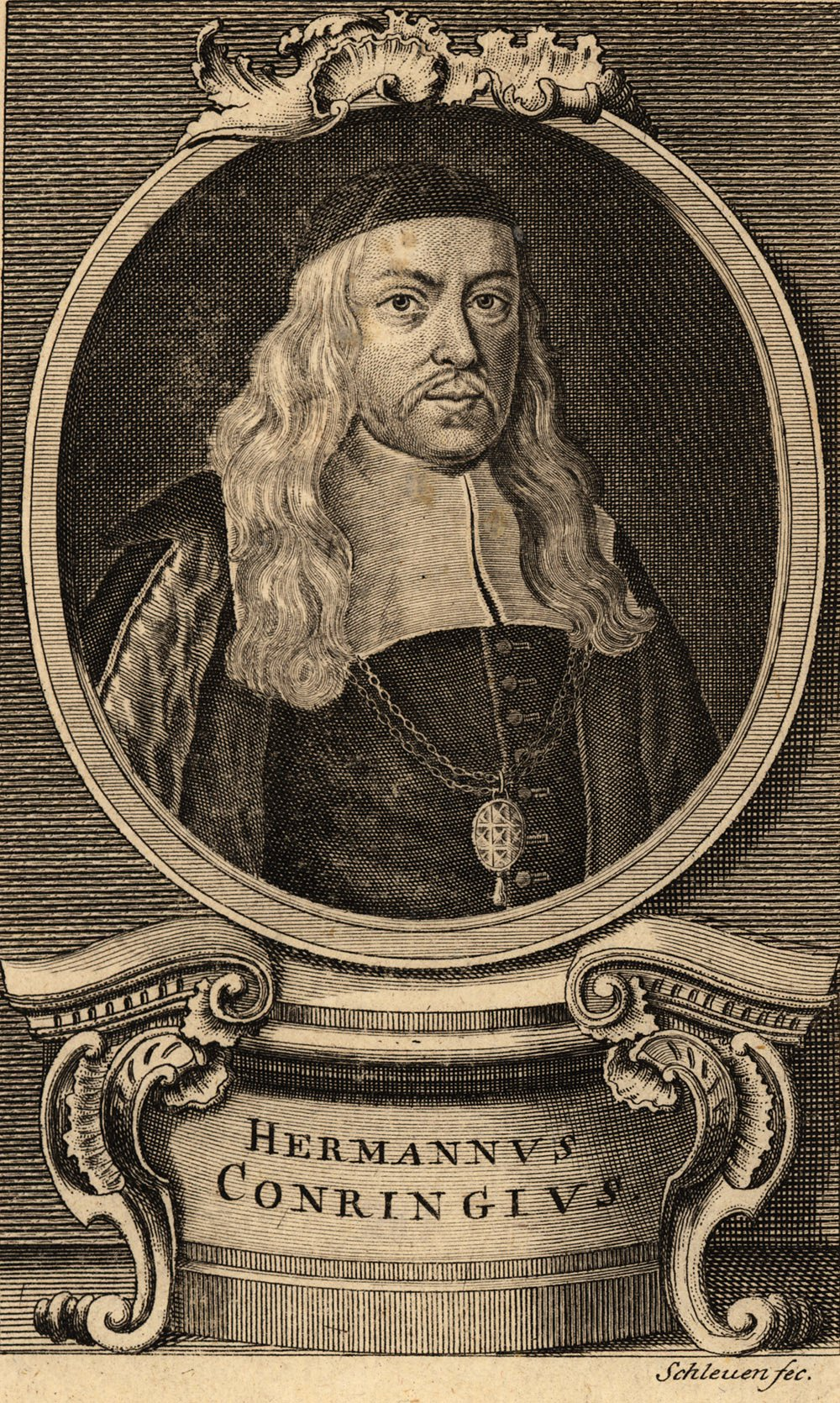
Hermann Conring

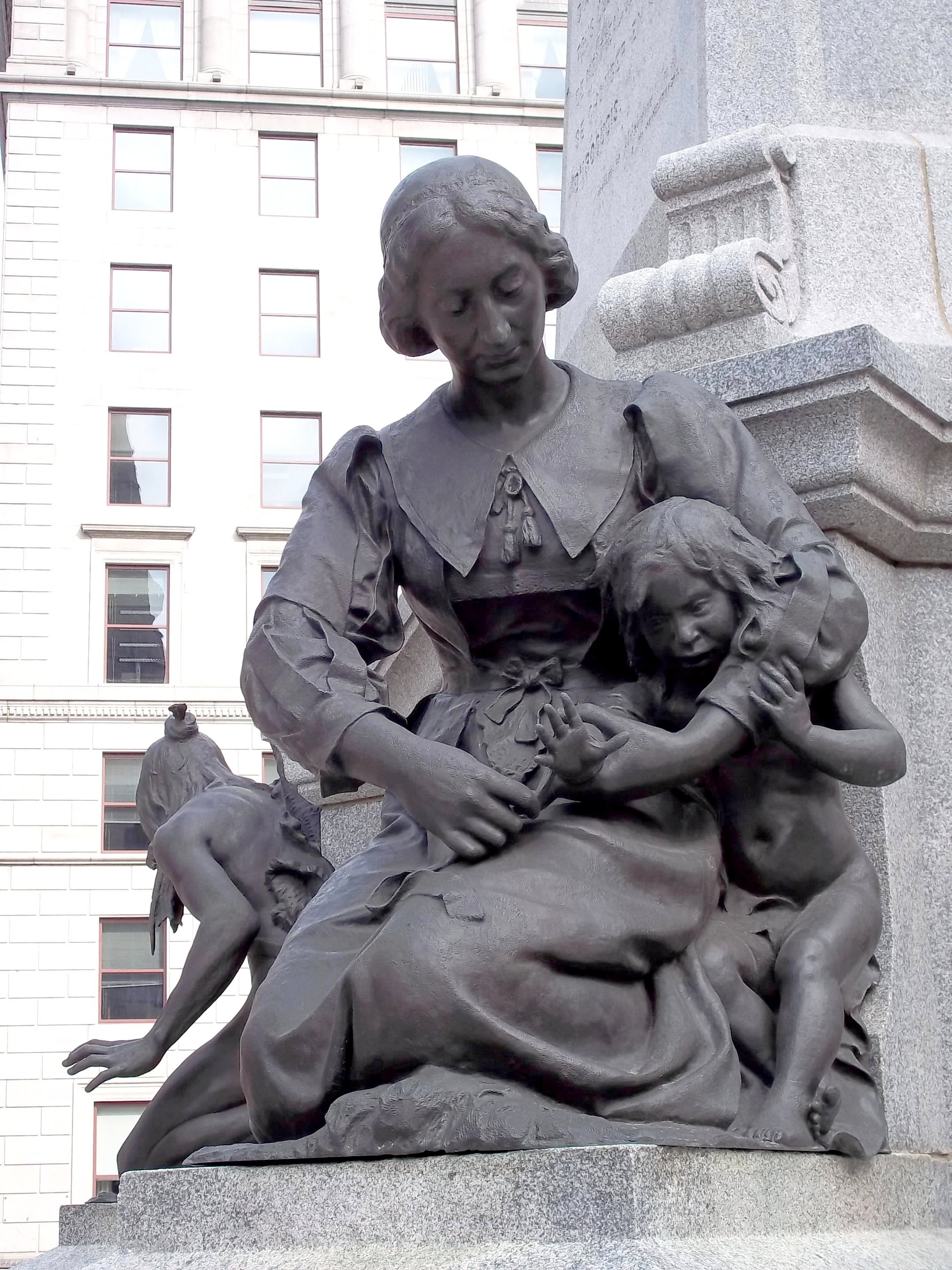
Jeanne Mance

- January 1 (bapt.) – Eva Ment, Dutch culture personality (d. 1652)
- January 4 (bapt.) – Edmund Castell, English orientalist (d. 1685)
- January 9 – William Dugard, English printer (d. 1662)
- January 11 – Judit Rumy, Hungarian noble (d. 1663)
- January 30 – Sir Orlando Bridgeman, 1st Baronet, of Great Lever (d. 1674)
- February 10 – Christine of France, Duchess of Savoy (d. 1663)
- February 12 – John Winthrop, the Younger, Governor of Connecticut (d. 1676)
- February 16 – William White, English politician (d. 1661)
- February 23
  - George Frederick of Nassau-Siegen, officer in the Dutch Army (d. 1674)
  - Richard Lloyd, English politician (d. 1676)
- February 27 – Laurent de La Hyre, French Baroque painter (d. 1656)
- c. February 28 – William Davenant, English poet and playwright (d. 1668)
- March – Henry Pierrepont, 1st Marquess of Dorchester (d. 1680)
- March 3 – Edmund Waller, English poet (d. 1687)
- March 18 – John X of Schleswig-Holstein-Gottorp, Prince-Bishop of Lübeck (1634–1655) (d. 1655)
- March 20 – Georg von Derfflinger, field marshal in the army of Brandenburg-Prussia (1618–1648) (d. 1695)
- March 25 – Gertrude More, English nun (d. 1633)
- March 27 – Hans Svane, Danish statesman (d. 1668)
- March 28 – Jacob Masen, German poet (d. 1681)
- March 30 – Vincentio Reinieri, Italian mathematician and astronomer (d. 1647)
- April 1 – Ernest Christopher, Count of Rietberg (1625–1640) (d. 1640)
- April 5 – Nicolas Perrot d'Ablancourt, Translator (d. 1664)
- April 6 – Amable de Bourzeys, French writer and academic (d. 1672)
- April 14 – Juliana of Hesse-Darmstadt, Countess of East Frisia (d. 1659)
- May 3
  - Marie de Bourbon, Countess of Soissons, wife of Thomas Francis (d. 1692)
  - Lorenzo Lippi, Italian painter and poet (d. 1665)
- May 6 – John Norton, American divine (d. 1663)
- May 12 – Joachim von Sandrart, German Baroque art-historian and painter (d. 1688)
- May 14 – Agnes of Hesse-Kassel, Princess consort of Anhalt-Dessau (d. 1650)
- May 16 (bapt.) – John Bulwer, British doctor (d. 1656)
- May 17 – Marco Faustini, Italian opera manager (d. 1676)
- May 22 – Wouter van Twiller, Director-General of New Netherland from 1633 until 1638 (d. 1654)
- May 23 – Juan Caramuel y Lobkowitz, Spanish writer (d. 1682)
- May 25 – Saint Charles Garnier, Jesuit missionary (d. 1649)
- June 3 – George Aribert of Anhalt-Dessau, German nobleman (d. 1643)
- June 6 – Pierre Corneille, French dramatist (d. 1684)
- June 16 – Arthur Chichester, 1st Earl of Donegall, Irish peer and soldier (d. 1675)
- June 19 – James Hamilton, 1st Duke of Hamilton, Scottish politician and noble (d. 1649)

Rembrandt

- July 8 – Jean Gamans, German hagiographer (d. 1684)
- July 10 – Corfitz Ulfeldt, Danish statesman (d. 1664)
- July 13 – Roland Fréart de Chambray, French architectural theorist (d. 1676)
- July 15 – Rembrandt (van Rijn), Dutch painter (d. 1669)
- July 20 – Hans Conrad Werdmüller, Swiss military commander (d. 1674)
- August 13 – Esteban de Aguilar y Zúñiga, Spanish writer (d. 1681)
- August 15 – Giovanna Maria Bonomo, beatified Italian Catholic nun (d. 1670)
- August 18 – Maria Anna of Spain (d. 1646)
- August 22 – Camille de Neufville de Villeroy, Archbishop of Lyon (d. 1693)
- September 1 – Nicholas Slanning, English politician (d. 1643)
- September 12 – John Spelman, English politician (d. 1663)
- September 18
  - Preben von Ahnen, German-born civil servant and landowner in Norway (d. 1675)
  - Zhang Xianzhong, Chinese rebel (d. 1647)
- September 22
  - Li Zicheng, Chinese rebel (d. 1645)
  - Richard Busby, English clergyman (d. 1695)
- September 28 – Sir William Drake, 1st Baronet, English politician (d. 1669)
- October 1 – Julian Maunoir, French Jesuit priest (d. 1683)
- October 12
  - Robert Barnham, English politician (d. 1685)
  - Christoph Bernhard von Galen, Westphalian Catholic prince-bishop of Münster and military leader (d. 1678)
- October 14 – Joan Maetsuycker, Governor-General of the Dutch East Indies from 1653 to 1678 (d. 1678)
- October 16 – Ottavio Amigoni, Italian painter (d. 1661)
- October 19 – Sir Gerrard Napier, 1st Baronet, English politician (d. 1673)
- October 20 – Francesco Maria Mancini, Italian Catholic cardinal (d. 1672)
- October 30 – Jean-Jacques Bouchard, French erotic writer (d. 1641)
- November 9 – Hermann Conring, German philosopher (d. 1681)
- November 12 – Jeanne Mance, French nurse and settler of New France (d. 1673)
- December 1 – Johann von Hoverbeck, Prussian diplomat (d. 1682)
- December 8 – Nicolò Sagredo, 105th Doge of Venice (d. 1676)
- December 11 – Thomas Nott, English Army officer (d. 1681)
- Leonard Calvert, Colonial governor of Maryland (d. 1647)
- Giovanni Francesco Grimaldi, Italian architect and painter (d. 1680)
- Thomas Herbert, English traveller and historian (d. 1682)
- John Robartes, 1st Earl of Radnor, English politician (d. 1685)
- Pierre du Ryer, French dramatist (d. 1658)
- Tokugawa Tadanaga, Japanese nobleman (d. 1633)
- Thomas Washbourne, English clergyman and poet (d. 1687)

1607

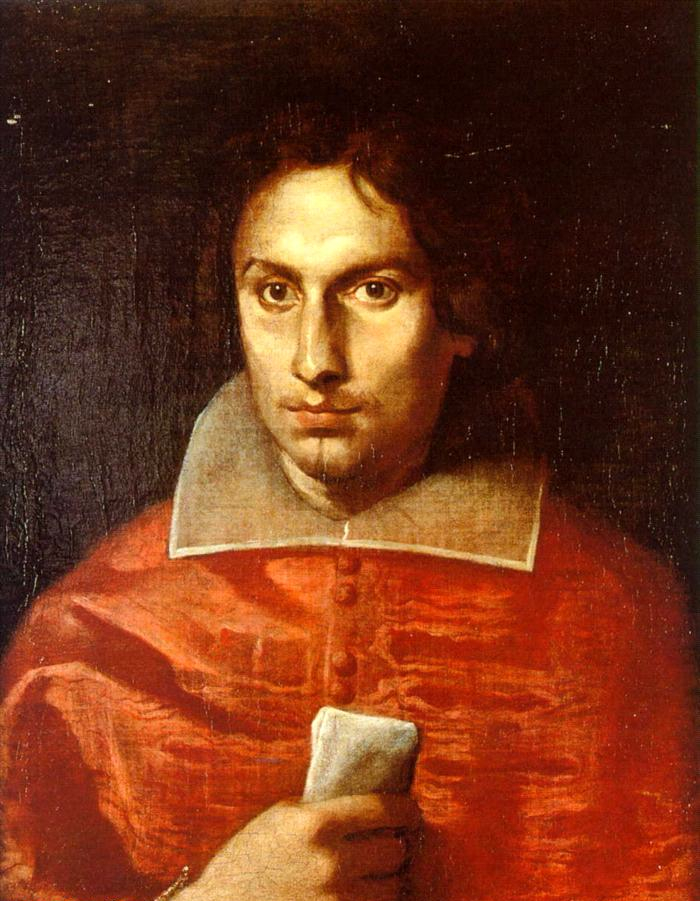
Antonio Barberini

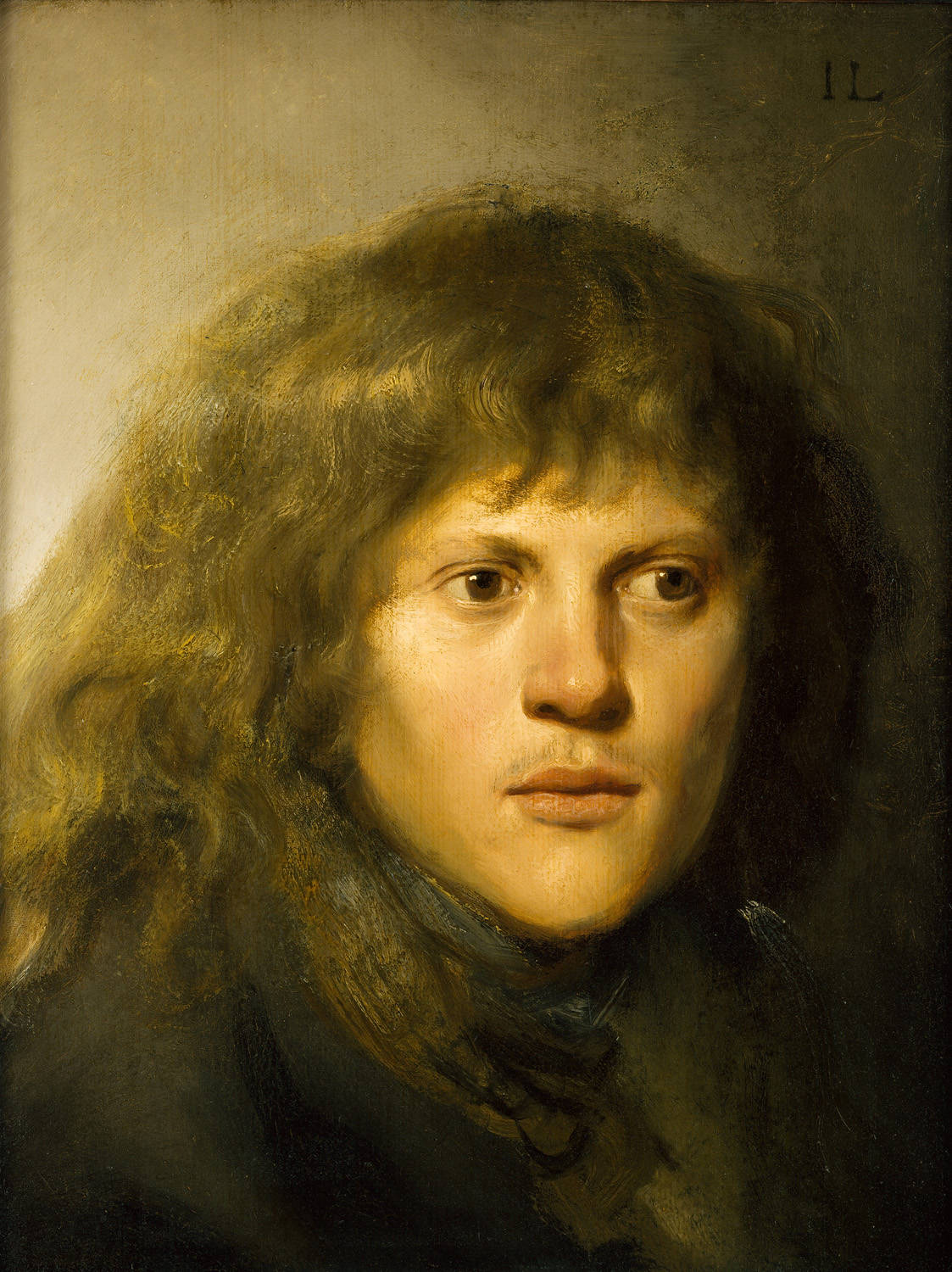
Jan Lievens

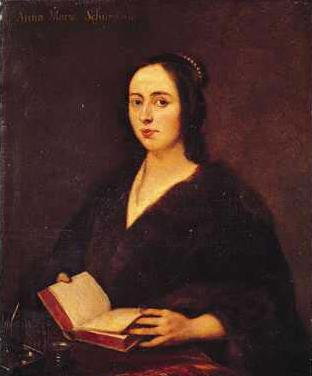
Anna Maria van Schurman

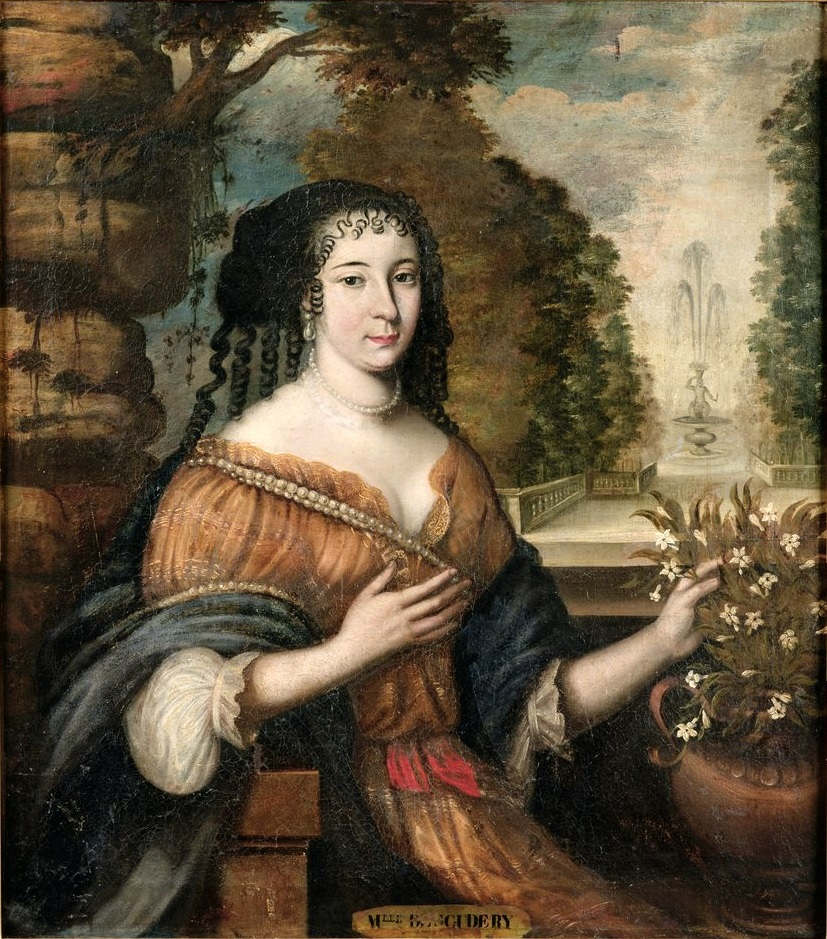
Madeleine de Scudéry

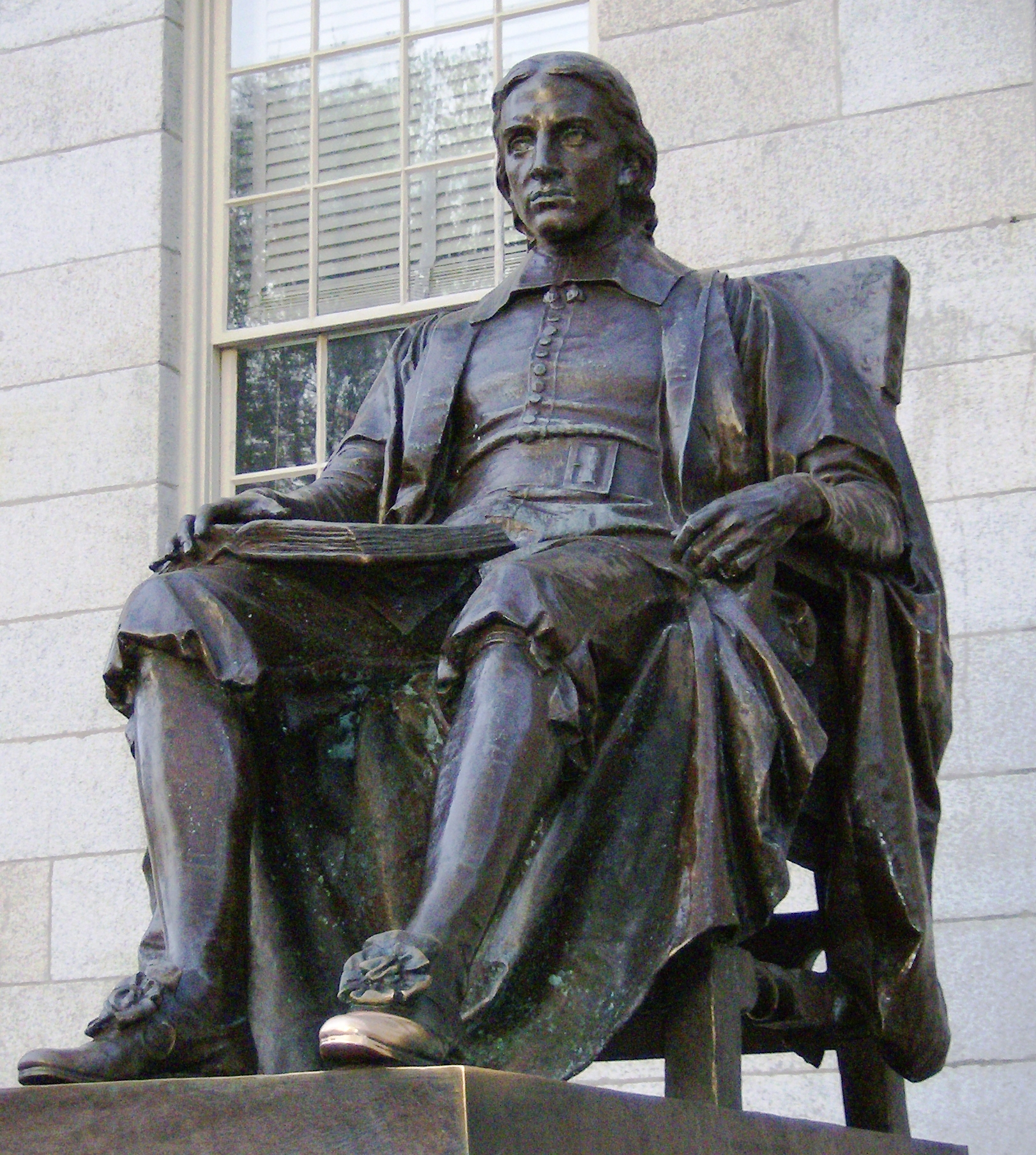
John Harvard

- January 10 – Isaac Jogues, French Jesuit missionary to the Native Americans (d. 1646)
- January 30 – Willem Nieupoort, Dutch politician, and diplomat (d. 1678)
- January 31 – James Stanley, 7th Earl of Derby (d. 1651)
- February 9 – Abraham Megerle, Austrian composer and organist (d. 1680)
- February 22 – Edward Thurland, English politician (d. 1683)
- February 25 – Ahasuerus Fromanteel, English clockmaker (d. 1693)
- February 27 – Christian Keymann, German hymnwriter (d. 1662)
- March – Archibald Campbell, 1st Marquess of Argyll, Scottish clan chief (d. 1661)
- March 8 – Johann Rist, German poet and dramatist known for hymns (d. 1667)
- March 9 – Gervase Holles, English Member of Parliament (d. 1675)
- March 10 – Thomas Wriothesley, 4th Earl of Southampton, English statesman (d. 1667)
- March 12 – Paul Gerhardt, German theologian (d. 1676)
- March 24 – Michiel de Ruyter, Dutch admiral (d. 1676)
- March 31 – Philippe Le Sueur de Petiville, French poet (d. 1657)
- April 5 – (bapt.) John Boys, English Royalist soldier, Lord Warden of the Cinque Ports (d. 1664)
- April 16 – Nicolas Henri, Duke of Orléans, French duke (d. 1611)
- April 26 – Countess Palatine Magdalene Catherine of Zweibrücken and Duchess of Birkenfeld (d. 1648)
- May 21 – Sir Philip Musgrave, 2nd Baronet, English politician (d. 1678)
- May 31 – Johann Wilhelm Baur, German artist (d. 1640)
- June 17 – Lacuzon, Franche-Comté military leader (d. 1681)
- June 24 – Jean-Jacques Renouard de Villayer, French postal pioneer (d. 1691)
- July 1 – Thomas de Critz, British artist (d. 1653)
- July 12 – Jean Petitot, French-Swiss enamel painter (d. 1691)
- July 13 – Václav Hollar, Bohemian etcher (d. 1677)
- August – Claude de Rouvroy, duc de Saint-Simon, French courtier (d. 1693)
- August 5
  - Antonio Barberini, Italian Catholic cardinal (d. 1671)
  - Philipp Friedrich Böddecker, German organist and composer (d. 1683)
- August 6 – Dirck van der Lisse, Dutch painter (d. 1669)
- August 15
  - St. Francisco Fernandez de Capillas, Spanish saint (d. 1648)
  - Herman IV, Landgrave of Hesse-Rotenburg (d. 1658)
- August 24 – Sebastian von Rostock, German bishop (d. 1671)
- September 15 – Archduke Charles of Austria (d. 1632)
- September 25 – Dorothea of Anhalt-Zerbst, Duchess of Brunswick-Wolfenbüttel (d. 1634)
- September 26 – Francesco Cairo, Italian painter (d. 1665)
- October 4 – Francisco de Rojas Zorrilla, Spanish dramatist (d. 1648)
- October 19 – Louis of Anhalt-Köthen, German prince (d. 1624)
- October 24 – Jan Lievens, Dutch painter (d. 1674)
- October 25 – Antonio de la Cerda, 7th Duke of Medinaceli, Grandee of Spain (d. 1671)
- November 1 – Georg Philipp Harsdörffer, Baroque-period German poet and translator (d. 1658)
- November 5 – Anna Maria van Schurman, Dutch painter (d. 1678)
- November 6 – Sigmund Theophil Staden, important early German composer (d. 1655)
- November 10 – John Gregory, English orientalist (d. 1646)
- November 15
  - Ernest Casimir, Count of Nassau-Weilburg, founder of the younger line of Nassau-Weilburg (d. 1655)
  - Madeleine de Scudéry, French writer (d. 1701)
- November 23 – Andrzej Trzebicki, nobleman and priest in the Polish-Lithuanian Commonwealth (d. 1679)
- November 25 – Kanō Naonobu, Japanese painter of the Kanō school of painting during the early Edo period (d. 1650)
- November 26 – John Harvard, English-born American clergyman (d. 1638)
- November 28 – Francesco Sforza Pallavicino (d. 1667)
- December 4 – John Frescheville, 1st Baron Frescheville, English politician (d. 1682)
- December 6 – Christopher Turnor, English judge (d. 1675)
- December 10 – Kjeld Stub, Danish priest (d. 1663)
- December 14 – John Kemény, Prince of Transylvania (d. 1662)
- December 17 – Pacecco De Rosa, Italian painter (d. 1656)
- December 19 – Remigius van Leemput, painter from the Southern Netherlands (d. 1675)
- December 30
  - Sir James Harington, 3rd Baronet, English politician (d. 1680)
  - Song Si-yeol, Korean philosopher (d. 1689)
- Elizabeth Tilley, English pilgrim settler in North America who was one of the original passengers of the Mayflower (d. 1687)
- Jan Kazimierz Krasiński, Polish nobleman (d. 1669)
- John Dixwell, English judge and regicide (d. 1689)
- Pierre de Fermat, French mathematician (d. 1665)
- Yagyū Jūbei Mitsuyoshi, Japanese samurai (d. 1650)

1608

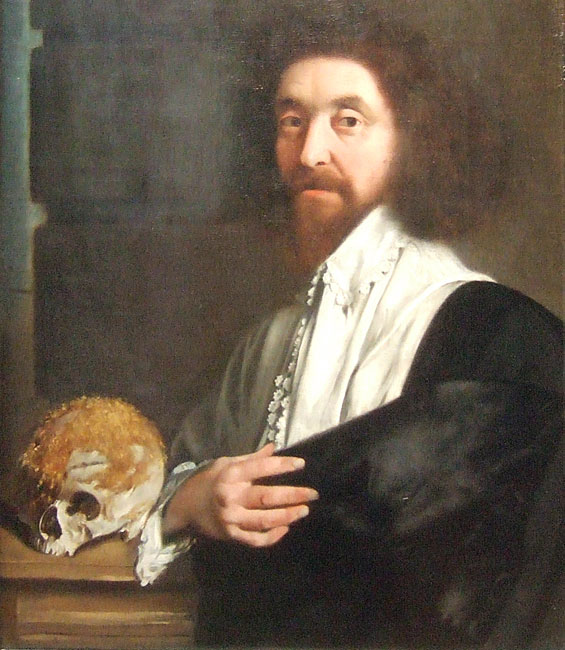
John Tradescant the Younger born 4 August

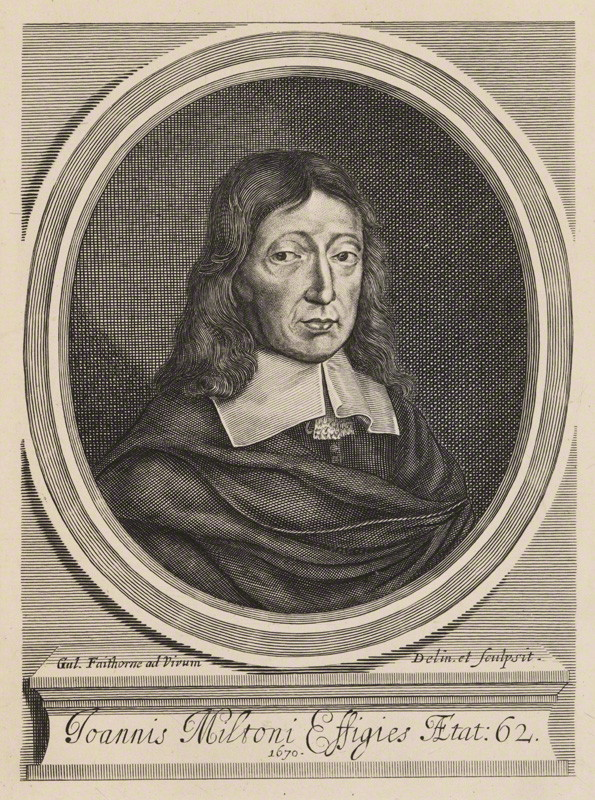
John Milton born 9 December

- January 10 – Henry Winthrop, governor of the Massachusetts Bay Company (d. 1630)
- January 14 – Francis Hawley, 1st Baron Hawley, English politician (d. 1684)
- January 21 – Theaurau John Tany, English Christian mystic (d. 1659)
- January 26 – Johannes Heinrich Ursinus, German Lutheran scholar (d. 1667)
- January 28 – Giovanni Alfonso Borelli, Italian physiologist and physicist (d. 1679)
- January 30 – John Oxenbridge, English Nonconformist divine (d. 1674)
- February 5 – Gaspar Schott, German Jesuit scholar (d. 1666)
- February 6 – António Vieira, Portuguese writer (d. 1697)
- February 12 – Daniello Bartoli, Italian Jesuit priest (d. 1685)
- February 20 – Arthur Capell, 1st Baron Capell of Hadham (d. 1649)
- February 21 – Elizabeth Barnard, Granddaughter of William Shakespeare (d. 1670)
- March 18 – Paul Ragueneau, French Jesuit missionary (d. 1680)
- March 27 – Thomas Rouse, English politician (d. 1676)
- March 28 – Léon Bouthillier, comte de Chavigny, French politician (d. 1652)
- April 13 – Cornelis Schrevel, Dutch scholar (d. 1664)
- April 14 – Illiam Dhone, Manx politician (d. 1663)
- April 15
  - Honoré Fabri, French mathematician (d. 1688)
  - John Huddleston, English monk of the Order of St. Benedict (d. 1698)
- April 20 – Edward Rainbowe, English clergyman and preacher (d. 1684)
- April 23 – Thomas Minor, American city founder (d. 1690)
- April 24 – Gaston, Duke of Orléans, third son of King Henry IV of France (d. 1660)
- May 1 – Pieter Post, Dutch architect, painter and printmaker (d. 1669)
- May 15 – René Goupil, French Jesuit lay missionary (d. 1642)
- June – Richard Fanshawe, English diplomat (d. 1666)
- June 19 (bapt.) – Thomas Fuller, English churchman and historian (d. 1661)
- July 13 – Ferdinand III, Holy Roman Emperor (d. 1657)
- July 14 – George Goring, Lord Goring, English Royalist soldier (d. 1657)
- July 24 – Sir Philip Wodehouse, 3rd Baronet, English baronet (d. 1681)
- August 4 – John Tradescant the Younger, British botanist (d. 1662)
- August 15 – Henry Howard, 22nd Earl of Arundel, English politician (d. 1652)
- August 16 – Jean-Louis Raduit de Souches, German Imperial field marshal (d. 1682)
- August 20 – Ludovicus a S. Carolo, French monk (d. 1670)
- August 30 – Alonso Perez de Leon, Spanish conquistador, explorer, man of letters (d. 1661)
- September 1 – Giacomo Torelli, Italian stage designer, engineer, and architect (d. 1678)
- September 15 – Niccolò Albergati-Ludovisi, Italian Catholic cardinal (d. 1687)
- September 17 – Cesare Facchinetti, Italian Catholic cardinal (d. 1683)
- September 19 – Alfonso Litta, Cardinal, Archbishop of Milan (d. 1679)
- September 20
  - Luis de Benavides Carrillo, Marquis of Caracena, Spanish general (d. 1668)
  - Jean-Jacques Olier, French Catholic priest (d. 1657)
- October 3 – Nicole, Duchess of Lorraine, French noble (d. 1657)
- October 15 – Evangelista Torricelli, Italian physicist and mathematician (d. 1647)
- October 18 – John Conant, English theologian, clergyman, and academic administrator (d. 1694)
- November 5 – Margareta Huitfeldt, Norwegian-Swedish noble (d. 1683)
- November 9 – Tiberio Fiorilli, Italian actor (d. 1694)
- November 10 – Eleanor of Anhalt-Zerbst, duchess by marriage of Schleswig-Holstein-Sønderburg-Norburg (d. 1681)
- November 13 (bapt.) – John Desborough, English soldier and politician (d. 1680)
- November 16 – Johann Freinsheim, German classical scholar, critic (d. 1660)
- November 23 – Francisco Manuel de Mello, Portuguese writer (d. 1666)
- December 6 – George Monck, 1st Duke of Albemarle, English soldier (d. 1670)
- December 8 – Vendela Skytte, Swedish noble (d. 1629)
- December 9 – John Milton, English poet (d. 1674)
- December 15
  - Joachim Lütkemann, German theologian (d. 1655)
  - John Tufton, 2nd Earl of Thanet, English earl (d. 1664)
- Thomas Barlow, Bishop of Lincoln, English churchman (d. 1691)
- Eudoxia Streshneva, Tsarina of Mikhail I of Russia (d. 1645)
- Ayşe Sultan and/or Hanzade Sultan, Ottoman princesses, daughters of Ahmed I

1609

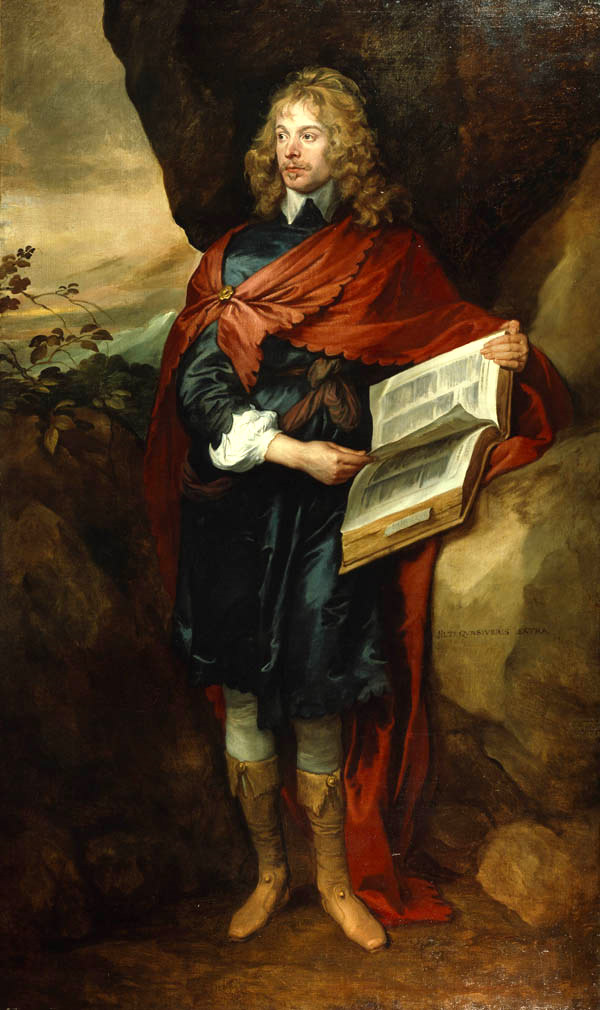
John Suckling

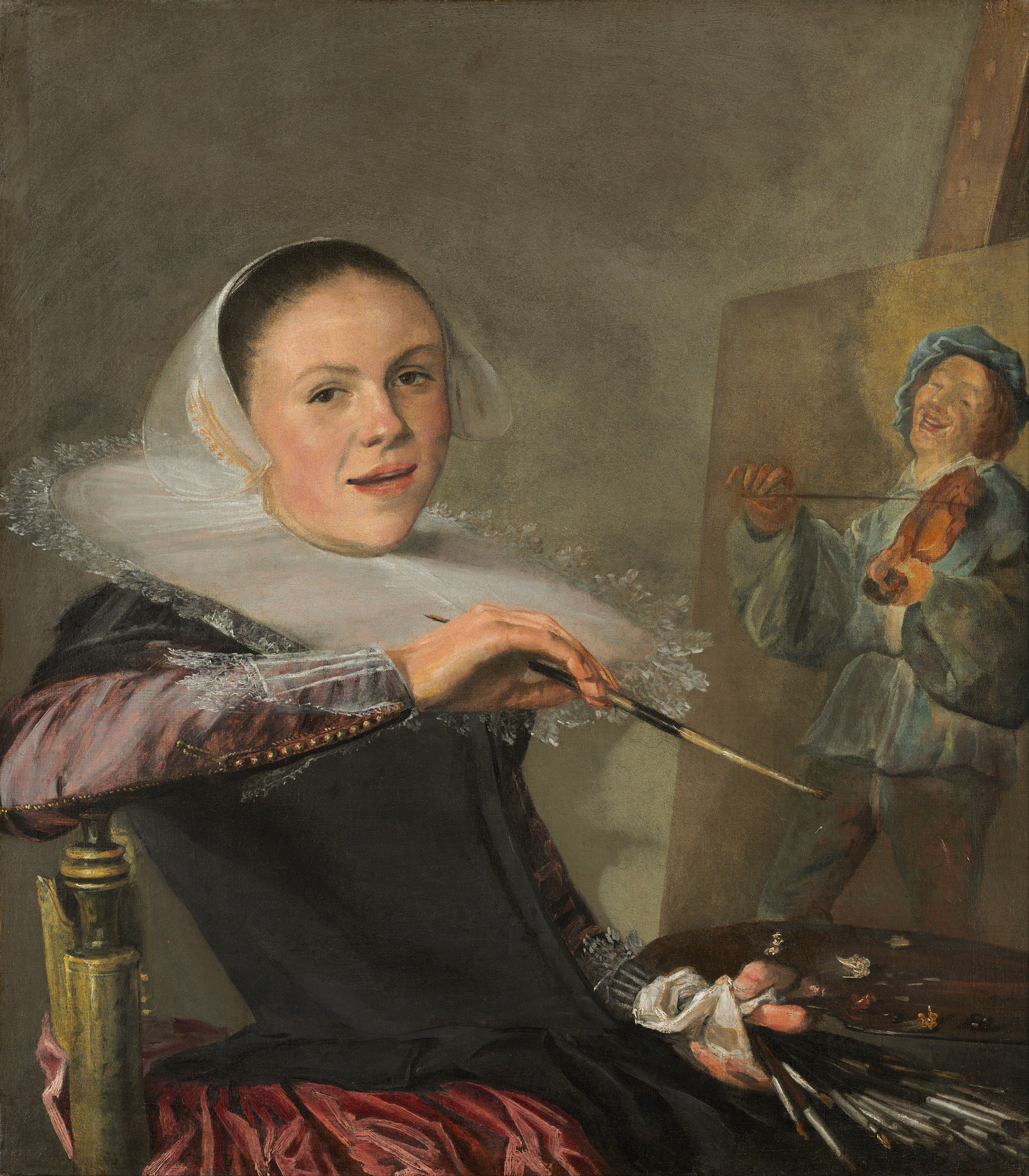
Judith Leyster

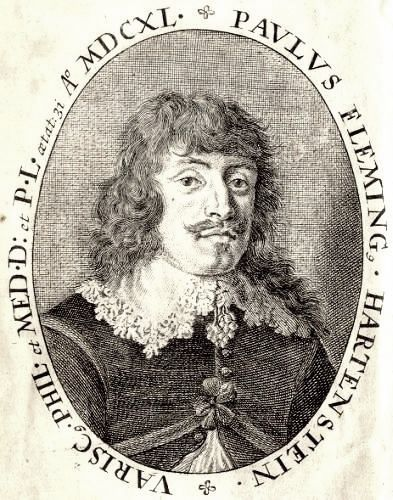
Paul Fleming

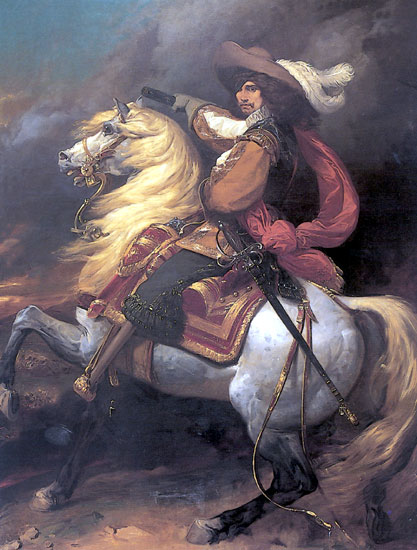
Josias von Rantzau

- January 18
  - Ferdinando Hastings, 6th Earl of Huntingdon, English politician (d. 1656)
  - Henry Oxenden, English poet (d. 1670)
- January 20 – Carlo Ceresa, Italian painter (d. 1679)
- January 30 – Václav Eusebius František, Prince of Lobkowicz, Austrian field marshal and prince (d. 1677)
- February 10
  - Lancelot Lake, Member of the English Parliament of (d. 1680)
  - John Suckling, English poet (d. 1642)
- February 14 – Bartram de Fouchier, Dutch painter (d. 1673)
- February 18 – Edward Hyde, 1st Earl of Clarendon, English statesman and historian (d. 1674)
- February 21 – Raimondo Montecuccoli, Italian general (d. 1680)
- March 16
  - Michael Franck, German composer and poet (d. 1667)
  - Agostino Mitelli, Italian painter (d. 1660)
- March 18 – King Frederick III of Denmark (d. 1670)
- March 22 – John II Casimir of Poland (d. 1672)
- March 23 – Johann Heinrich Schönfeld, German artist (d. 1684)
- March 25 – Paul Fréart de Chantelou, French collector and patron of the arts (d. 1694)
- April 6 – Walter Aston, 2nd Lord Aston of Forfar, second and eldest surviving son of Walter Aston (d. 1678)
- April 15 – Richard Winwood, English politician (d. 1688)
- May 6 – Antonie Waterloo, Flemish painter (d. 1690)
- May 10 – Mauritia Eleonora of Portugal, Princess of Portugal and through marriage countess of Nassau-Siegen (d. 1674)
- June 2 – Zsófia Bosnyák, Hungarian noblewoman (d. 1644)
- June 17 – John of Hesse-Braubach, German general (d. 1651)
- June 29 – Pierre-Paul Riquet, French engineer and canal builder (d. 1680)
- July 17 – Wilhelm Gumppenberg, German Jesuit theologian (d. 1675)
- July 28 – Judith Leyster, Dutch painter (d. 1660)
- July 29 – Maria Gonzaga, Duchess of Montferrat, Italian noble (d. 1660)
- August 6 – Richard Bennett, British Colonial Governor of Virginia (d. 1675)
- August 21 – Jean Rotrou, French poet and tragedian (d. 1650)
- August 25 – Giovanni Battista Salvi da Sassoferrato (d. 1685)
- August 30
  - Sir Alexander Carew, 2nd Baronet, English politician (d. 1644)
  - Artus Quellinus the Elder, Flemish sculptor (d. 1668)
- September 3 – Raymond Breton, French missionary (d. 1679)
- September 19 (or 1605) – Thomas Gouge, English minister (d. 1681)
- October 5 – Paul Fleming, German physician and poet (d. 1640)
- October 8 – John Clarke, English physician (d. 1676)
- October 9 – Thomas Weston, 4th Earl of Portland, younger son of the Richard Weston (d. 1688)
- October 14 – Ernest Günther, Duke of Schleswig-Holstein-Sonderburg-Augustenburg, Duke of Schleswig-Holstein of its Sonderborg line (d. 1689)
- October 16 – Thomas Minors, English politician and merchant (d. 1677)
- October 18 – Josias von Rantzau, Marshal of France (d. 1650)
- October 19 – Gerrard Winstanley, English Protestant religious reformer (d. 1676)
- October 26 – William Sprague, English co-founder of Charlestown, Massachusetts (d. 1675)
- October 29 – Wadham Wyndham, English judge (d. 1668)
- November 1 – Matthew Hale, Lord Chief Justice of England (d. 1676)
- November 23 – Sophia Eleonore of Saxony, German duchess (d. 1671)
- November 25 – Henrietta Maria of France, queen of England, Scotland and Ireland (d. 1669)
- November 26 – Henry Dunster, first President of Harvard College (d. 1659)
- December 6 – Nicholas Francis, Duke of Lorraine (d. 1670)
- December 11 – Alexander Cooper, English Baroque miniature painter (d. 1660)
- December 13 – Isbrand van Diemerbroeck, Dutch physician (d. 1674)
- December 24 – Philip Warwick, English writer and politician (d. 1683)
- December 30 – Anna Maria von Eggenberg, née Brandenburg-Bayreuth, Austrian noble (d. 1680)
- Luc d'Achery, French Benedictine (d. 1685)
- Samuel Cooper, English miniature painter (d. 1672)
- Alberich Mazak, Austrian composer (d. 1661)
- Elizabeth Isham, English diarist (d. 1654)
- Hannibal Sehested, Danish statesman (d. 1666)
- Thomas Greene, Colonial governor of Maryland (d. 1651)

Gauthier de Costes, seigneur de la Calprenède, French novelist and dramatist (d. 1663)

== Deaths ==
1600

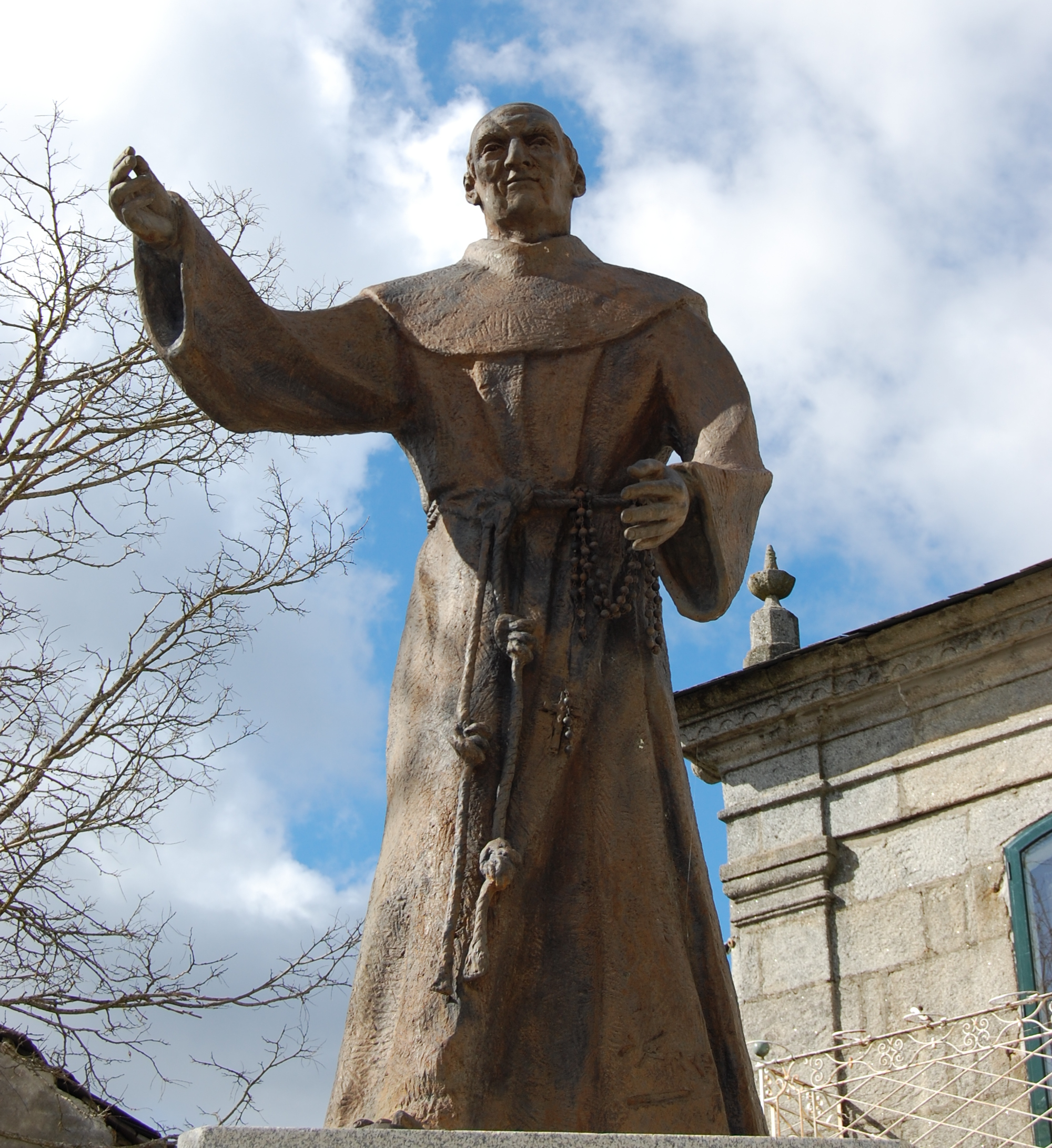
Sebastian de Aparicio

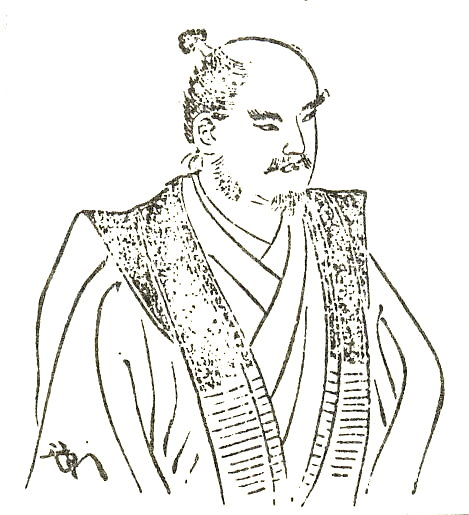
Shima Sakon

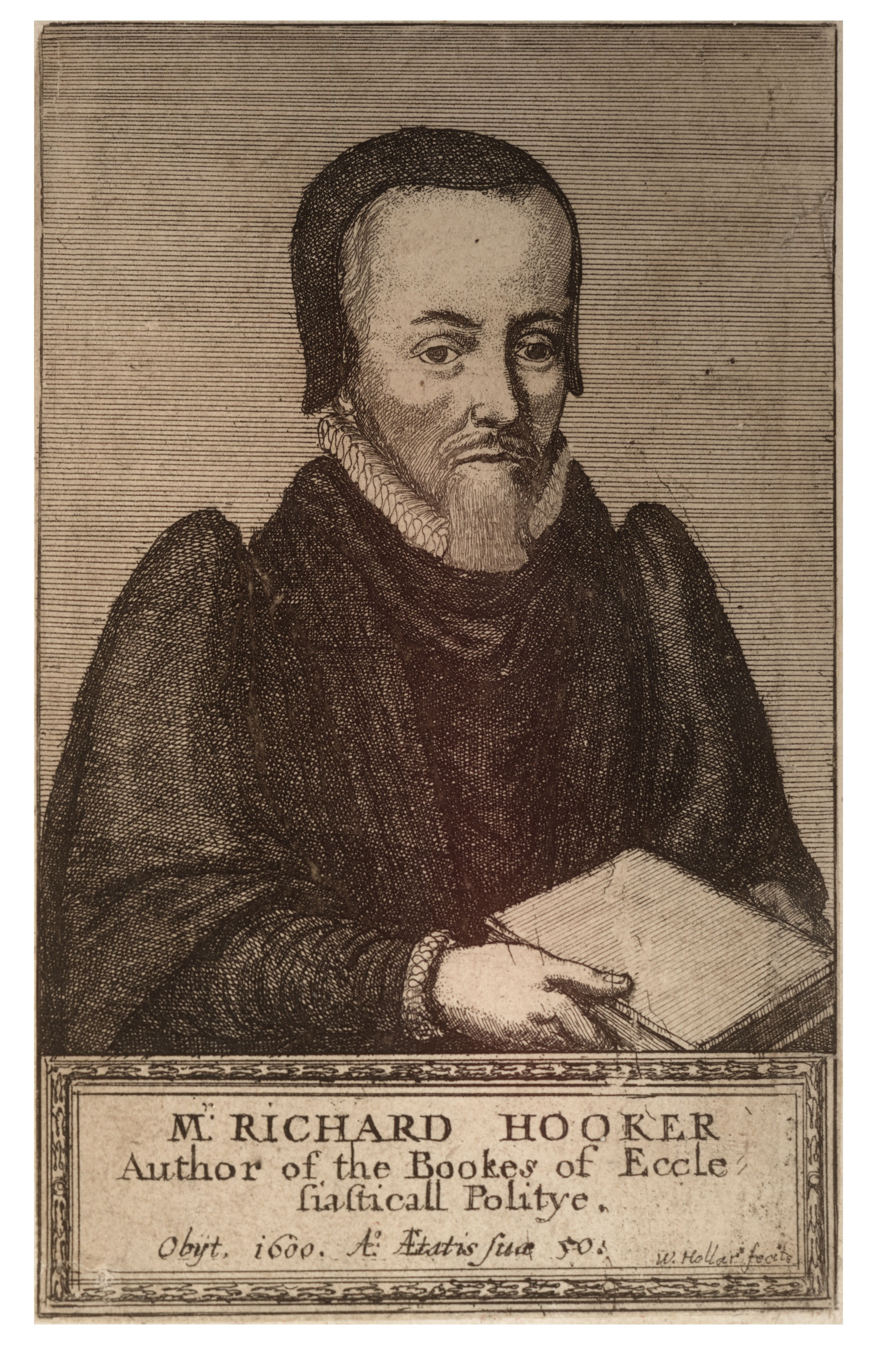
Richard Hooker

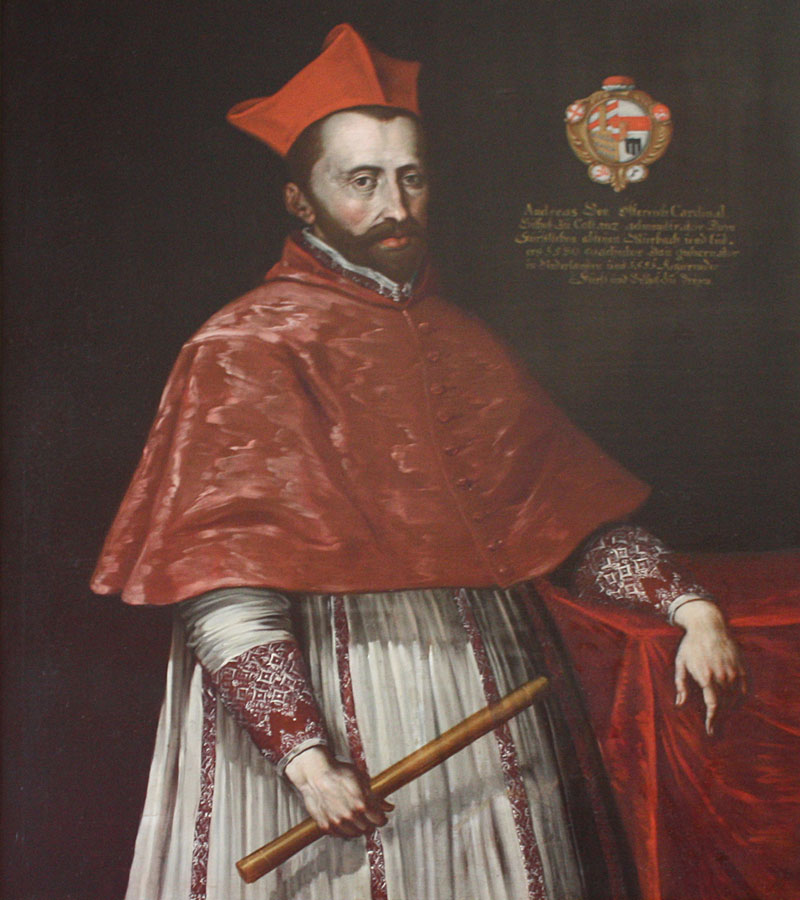
Margrave Andrew of Burgau

- January 9 – John Spencer, English landowner and politician (b. 1549)
- January 21 – Jerzy Radziwiłł, Polish–Lithuanian nobleman (szlachcic) from the Radziwiłł family (b. 1556)
- February 9 – John Frederick, Duke of Pomerania, Protestant Bishop of Cammin (1567–1574) and ruling Duke of Pomerania (1569–1600) (b. 1542)
- February 15 – José de Acosta, Spanish Jesuit missionary and naturalist (b. 1540)
- February 17 – Giordano Bruno, Italian philosopher (burned at the stake) (b. 1548)
- February 25 – Sebastian de Aparicio, Spanish colonial industrialist, Roman Catholic priest and blessed in Mexico (b. 1502)
- February 29 – Caspar Hennenberger, German historian and cartographe (b. 1529)
- March 6 – Johann Major, German poet and theologian (b. 1533)
- March 20 – Gustaf Banér, Swedish noble (b. 1547)
- April 1 – Esperanza Malchi, Ottoman businessperson
- April – Thomas Deloney, English writer (b. 1543)
- May 17 – Thomas Leighton, English politician (b. 1554)
- May 18
  - Nicolaus Olai Bothniensis, Swedish archbishop (b. 1550)
  - Fulvio Orsini, Italian humanist, historian and archaeologist (b. 1529)
- May 19 – Abe Masakatsu, Japanese nobleman (b. 1541)
- June 3 – Juan Grande Román, Spanish Catholic saint (b. 1546)
- June 8 – Edward Fortunatus, German nobleman (b. 1565)
- June 25 – David Chytraeus, German historian and theologian (b. 1530)
- June 19 – Christopher Layer, English politician (b. 1531)
- July 5 – Jean Kincaid, Scottish murderer (b. 1579)
- July 7 – Thomas Lucy, English politician (b. 1532)
- July 20 – William More, English courtier (b. 1520)
- July 27 – John Glanville, English politician (b. 1542)
- August 5
  - Alexander Ruthven, Scottish earl (b. 1580)
  - John Ruthven, 3rd Earl of Gowrie, Scottish conspirator (b. 1577)
  - Queen Uiin, Korean royal consort (b. 1555)
- August 18 – Sebastiano Montelupi, Italian businessman (b. 1516)
- August 22 – Nicasius de Sille, Dutch diplomat (b. 1543)
- August 25 – Hosokawa Gracia, Japanese noblewoman (b. 1563)
- August 27 – Mizuno Tadashige, Japanese nobleman (b. 1541)
- September 1 – Tadeáš Hájek, Czech physician and astronomer (b. 1525)
- September 25 – Antoine du Verdier, French politician (b. 1544)
- September 26 – Claude Le Jeune, French composer (b. 1530)
- October 12 – Luis de Molina, Spanish Jesuit priest and philosopher (b. 1535)
- October 16 – Nicolaus Reimers, German astronomer (b. 1551)
- October 17 – Cornelis de Jode, Flemish cartographer, engraver and publisher (b. 1568)
- October 21
  - Toda Katsushige, Japanese warlord (b. 1557)
  - Shima Sakon, Japanese samurai (b. 1540)
  - Shimazu Toyohisa, Japanese samurai (b. 1570)
  - Ōtani Yoshitsugu, Japanese samurai (b. 1558)
- November 3 – Richard Hooker, English Anglican theologian (b. 1554)
- November 6
  - Ishida Mitsunari, Japanese feudal lord (decapitated) (b. 1560)
  - Konishi Yukinaga, Japanese Christian warlord (b. 1555)
- November 8 – Natsuka Masaie, Japanese warlord (b. 1562)
- November 12 – Margrave Andrew of Burgau, German nobleman, Cardinal, Bishop of Constance and Brixen (b. 1558)
- November 15 – Sigmund Fugger von Kirchberg und Weißenhorn, bishop of Regensburg (b. 1542)
- November 17 – Kuki Yoshitaka, Japanese naval commander (b. 1542)
- November 25 – Juan Téllez-Girón, 2nd Duke of Osuna, Spanish duke (b. 1559)
- November 30 – Nanda Bayin, King of Burma (b. 1535)
- December 3 – Roger North, 2nd Baron North, English politician (b. 1530)
- December 16 – Charles I, Count Palatine of Zweibrücken-Birkenfeld (1569–1600) (b. 1560)
- Gilles de Noailles – French Ambassador to the Ottoman Empire from 1575 to 1579 (b. 1524)

1601

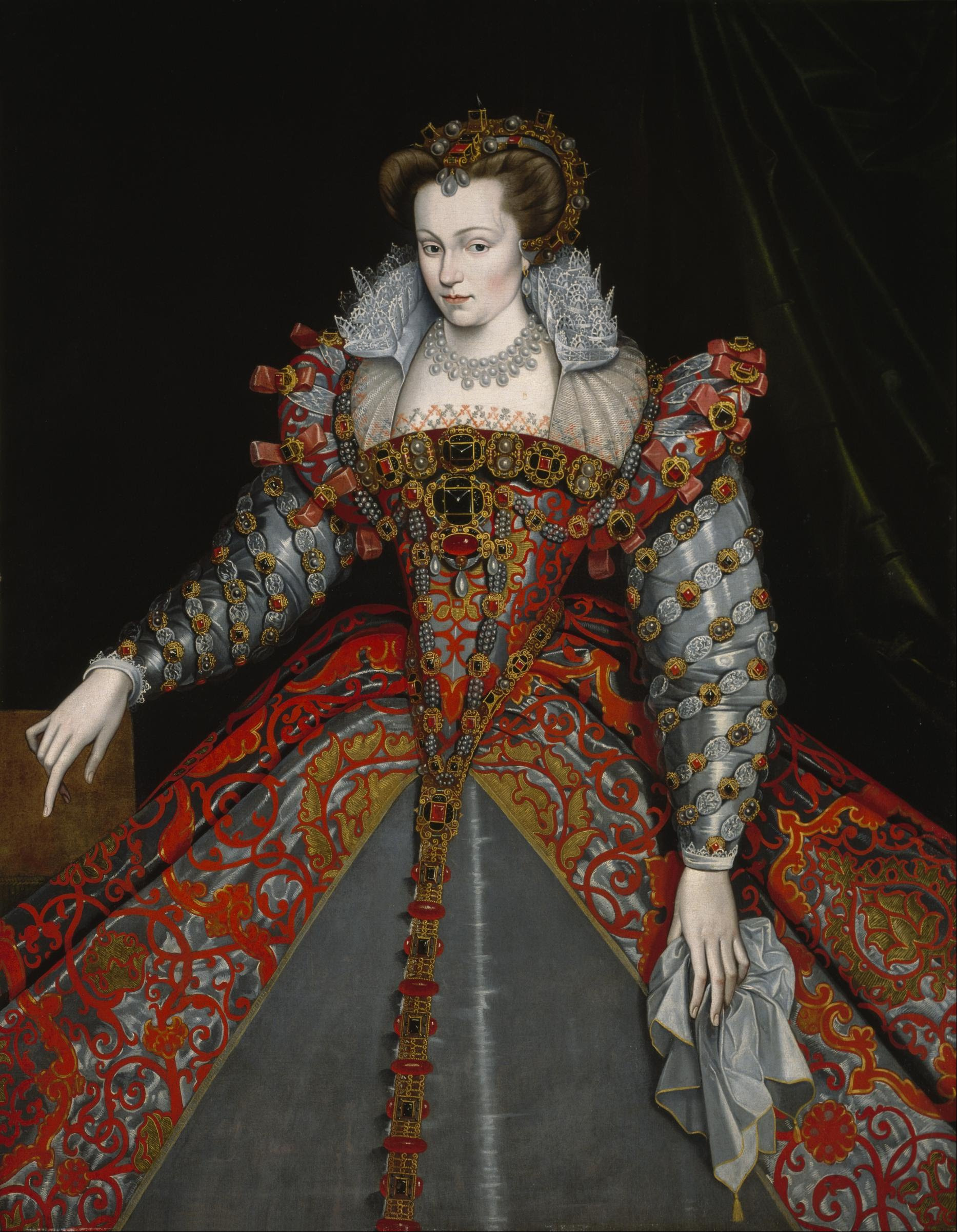
Louise of Lorraine

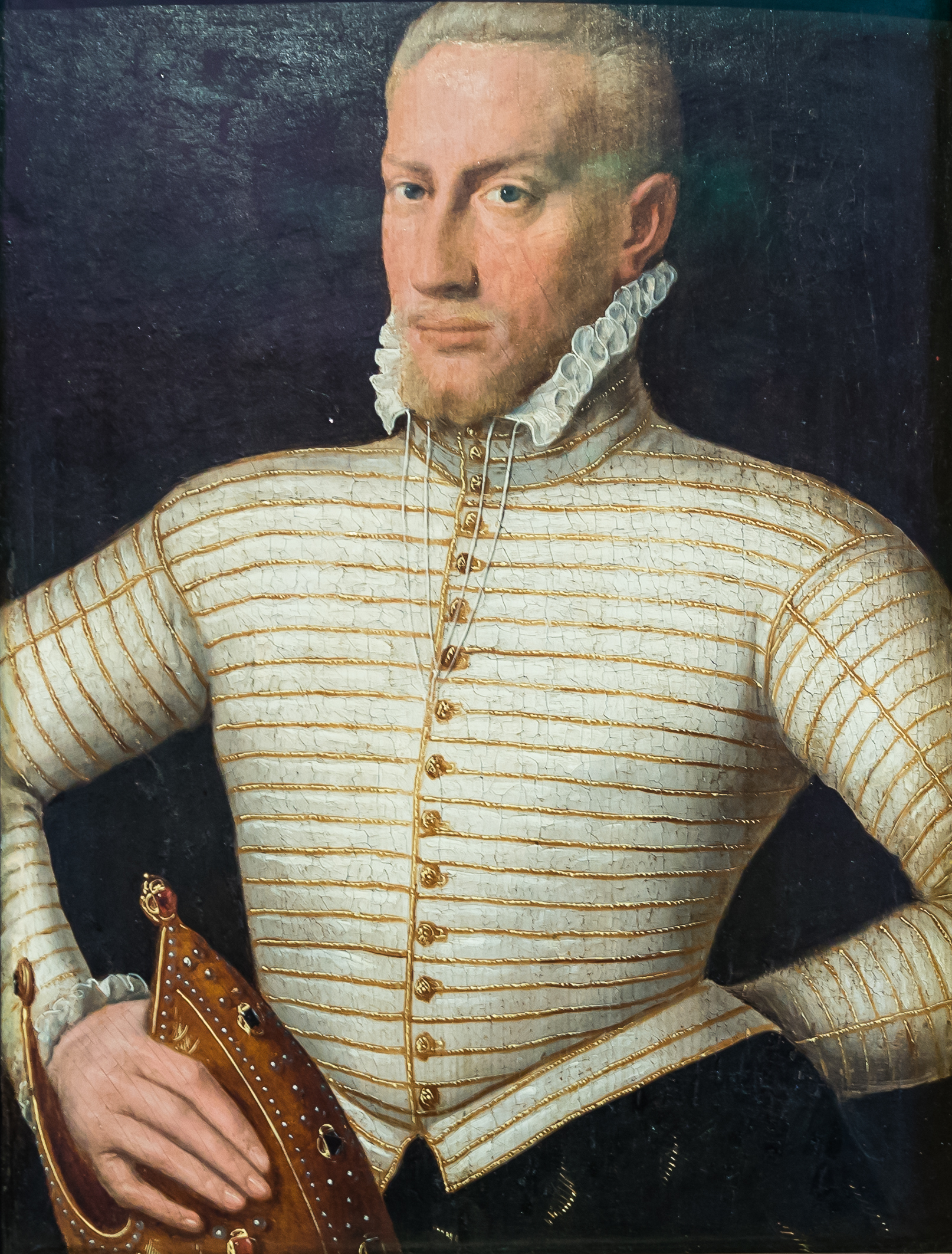
Gebhard Truchsess von Waldburg

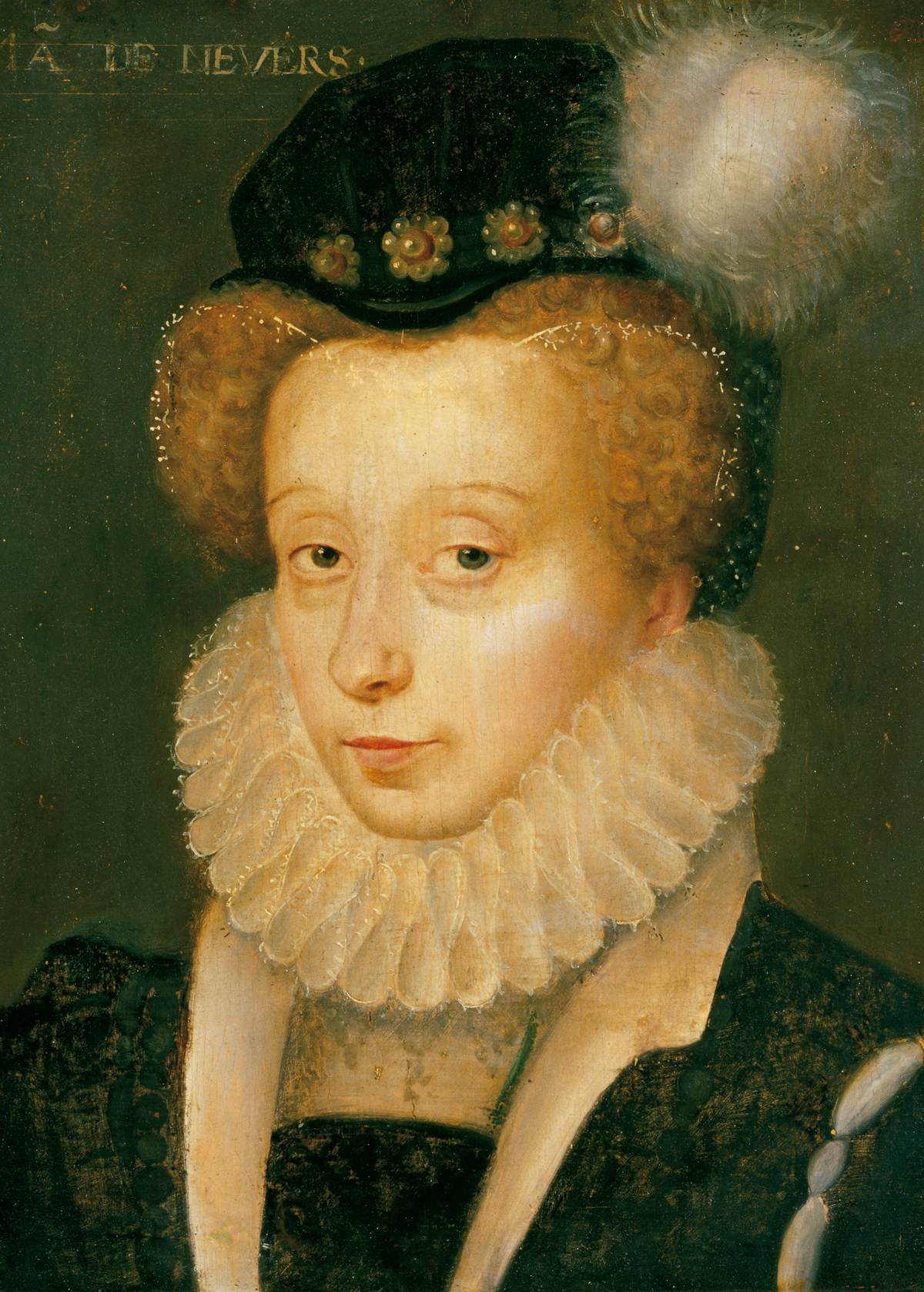
Henriette of Cleves

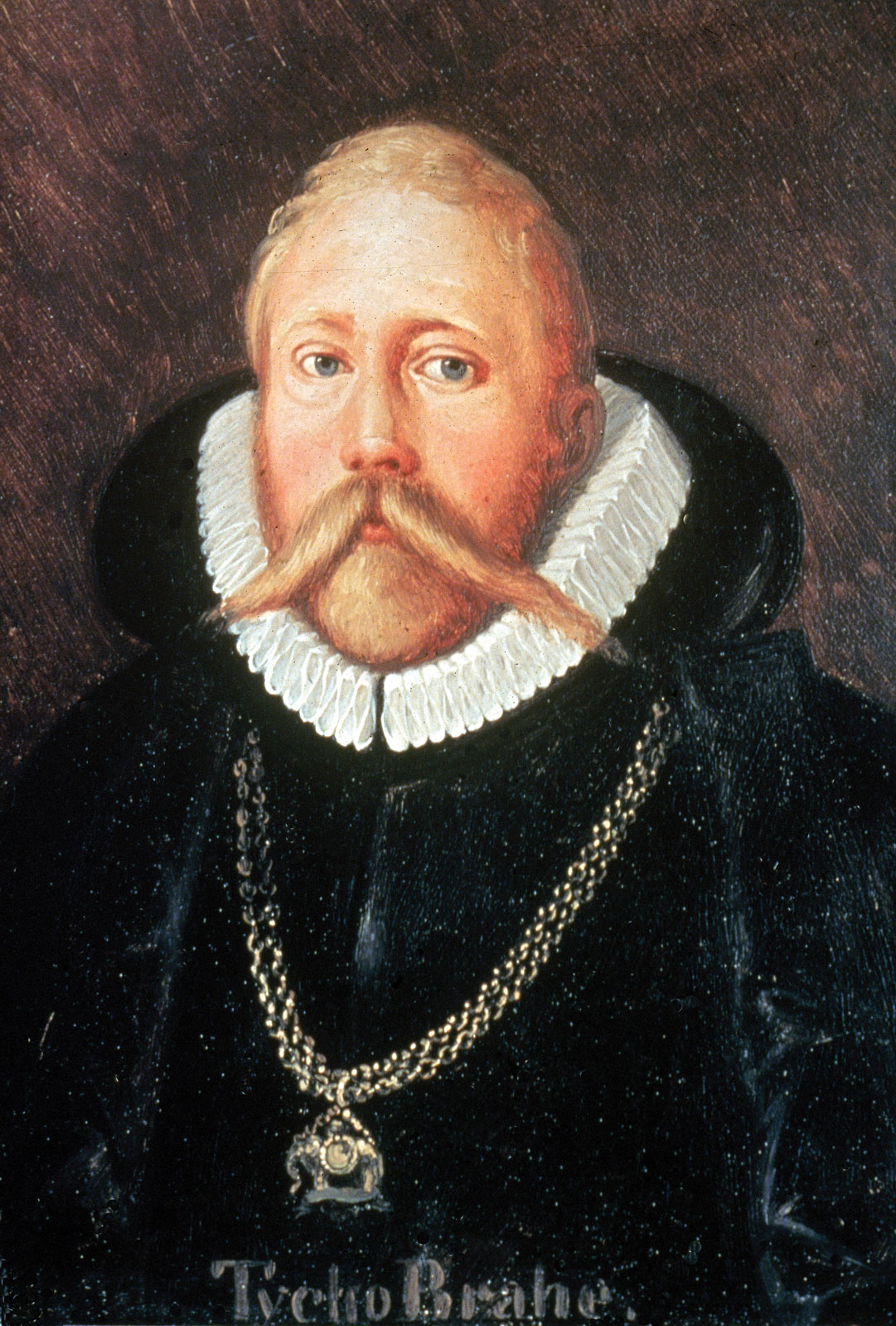
Tycho Brahe

- January 11 – Scipione Ammirato, Italian historian (b. 1531)
- January 17 – Christoffer Valkendorff, Danish politician (b. 1525)
- January 19 – Henry Herbert, 2nd Earl of Pembroke, English statesman (b. 1538)
- January 29 – Louise of Lorraine, French queen consort (b. 1553)
- February 7 – Martin Garzez, Aragonese-born 53rd Grandmaster of the Knights Hospitaller (b. 1526)
- February 25 – Robert Devereux, 2nd Earl of Essex, English politician (b. 1566)
- February 27 – Anne Line, English Catholic martyr (b. c. 1563)
- March 2 – Antonio del Rincón, Mexican academic (b. 1566)
- March 13 – Henry Cuffe, English politician (b. 1563)
- April 5 – Wolfgang von Dalberg, Roman Catholic Archbishop of Mainz, Germany (b. 1538)
- April 10 – Mark Alexander Boyd, Scottish poet and soldier of fortune (b. 1562)
- May 10 – Hans van Steenwinckel the Elder, Flemish/Danish architect, sculptor (b. 1550)
- May 12 – Anna III, Abbess of Quedlinburg, Princess-Abbess of Quedlinburg (b. 1565)
- May 19 – Costanzo Porta, Italian composer (b. 1528)
- May 21 – Gebhard Truchsess von Waldburg, Archbishop-Elector of Cologne (b. 1547)
- June 11 – Françoise d'Orléans-Longueville, French princess (b. 1549)
- June 16 – Lewis Mordaunt, 3rd Baron Mordaunt, Member of Parliament and High Sheriff of Bedfordshire and Buckinghamshire (b. 1538)
- June 17 – Gabriel Goodman, English priest (b. 1528)
- June 24 – Henriette of Cleves, Duchess of Nevers, Countess of Rethel (b. 1542)
- June 25 – Peregrine Bertie, 13th Baron Willoughby de Eresby, English baron (b. 1555)
- June 27 – Henry Norris, 1st Baron Norreys (b. 1525)
- August 9 – Prince Michael the Brave of Wallachia (b. 1558)
- August 11 – Johannes Heurnius, Dutch physician (b. 1543)
- August 19 – William Lambarde, English antiquarian and politician (b. 1536)
- September 7 – John Shakespeare, English glover, father of William Shakespeare (b. 1529)
- September 12 – Meletius I Pegas, Greek Patriarch of Alexandria (b. 1549)
- September 20 – Fernando Ruiz de Castro Andrade y Portugal, Grandee of Spain (b. 1548)
- October 12 – Nicholas Brend, English landowner (b. 1560)
- October 21 – Hoshina Masanao, Japanese daimyō of the Takeda clan (b. 1542)
- October 24
  - Tycho Brahe, Danish astronomer (b. 1546)
  - Louis Philip, Count Palatine of Guttenberg, Palatinate-Veldenz (b. 1577)
- November 16 – Charles Neville, 6th Earl of Westmorland, exiled English nobleman (b. 1542)
- December 3 – Peter Thyraeus, German theologian (b. 1546)
- December 17 – Bernardino de Cárdenas y Portugal, Duque de Maqueda, Spanish noble (b. 1553)
- Girolamo Dalla Casa, Italian composer
- Ogawa Suketada, Japanese daimyō (b. 1549)
- Onodera Shigemichi, Japanese samurai

1602

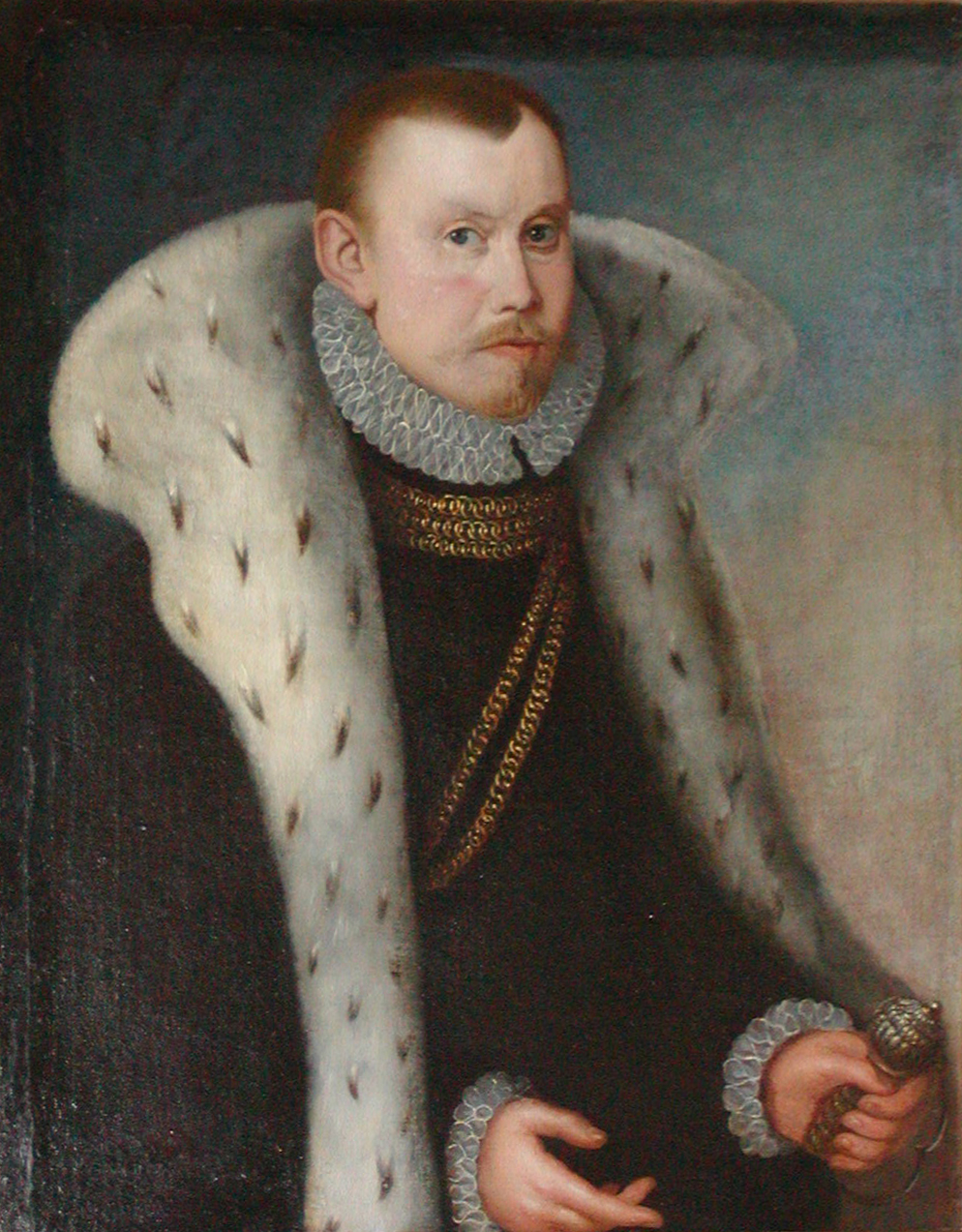
Ludvig Munk died 8 April

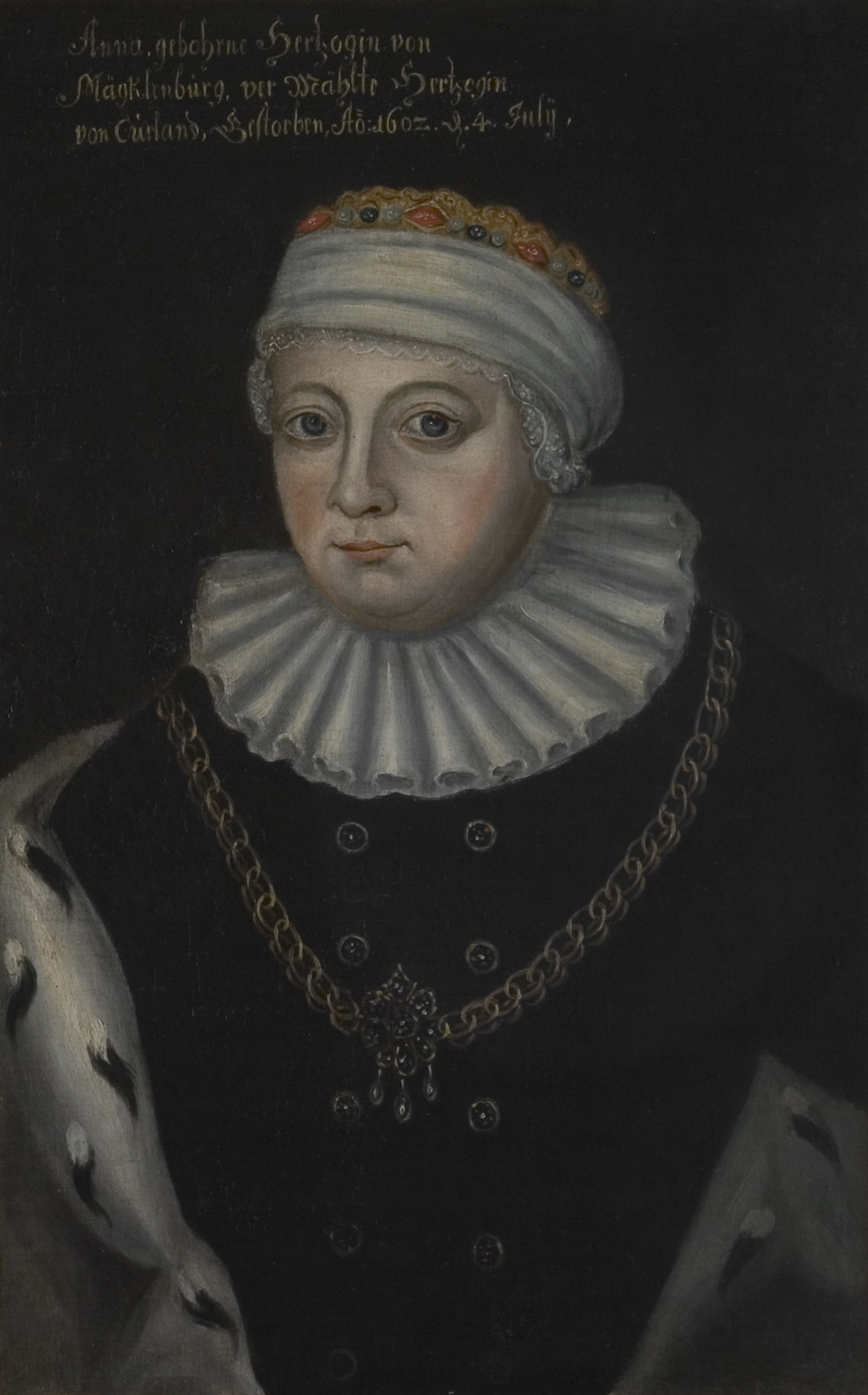
Anna of Mecklenburg died 4 July

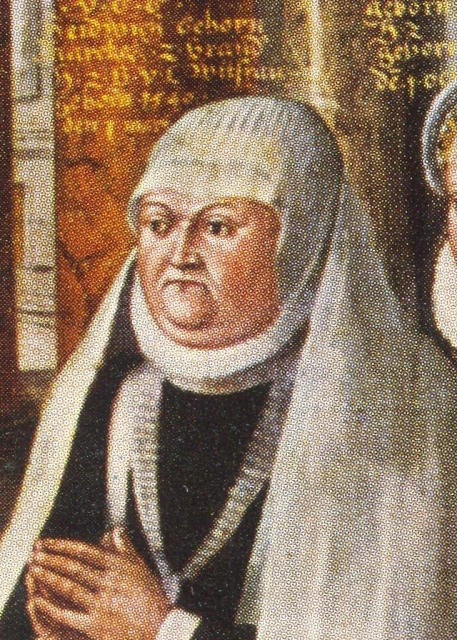
Hedwig of Brandenburg died 21 October

David I of Kakheti died 21 October

- January – Claude Fauchet, French historian
- February 3 – Paulus Melissus, German composer (b. 1539)
- February 13 – Alexander Nowell, English clergyman (b. 1507)
- February 19 – Philippe Emmanuel, Duke of Mercœur, French soldier (b. 1558)
- March 11 – Emilio de' Cavalieri, Italian composer (b. c. 1550)
- March 12 – Philip IV, Count of Nassau-Weilburg and Nassau-Saarbrücken (1574–1602) (b. 1542)
- March 22 – Agostino Carracci, Italian painter and graphical artist (b. 1557)
- March 24 – Ii Naomasa, Japanese general (b. 1561)
- March 25 – Joachim Frederick of Brieg, Duke of Wołów (b. 1550)
- April 8 – Ludvig Munk, Governor-general of Norway (b. 1537)
- April 10 – Amalia of Neuenahr, German noble (b. 1539)
- April 20 – Thomas Tichborne, English martyr (b. 1567)
- April 26 – Antonio Maria Salviati, Italian Catholic cardinal (b. 1537)
- May 9 – Giulio Antonio Santorio, Italian Catholic cardinal (b. 1532)
- May 22 – Renata of Lorraine (b. 1544)
- May 27 – Robert Stuart, Duke of Kintyre and Lorne, infant son of King James I/VI
- July 4 – Anna of Mecklenburg, Duchess consort of Courland (1566–1587) (b. 1533)
- July 7 – Friedrich Wilhelm I, Duke of Saxe-Weimar, German noble (b. 1562)
- July 31 – Charles de Gontaut, 1st Duke of Biron, French noble and military commander (b. 1562)
- August 12 – Abu'l-Fazl ibn Mubarak, Mughal vizier and historian (b. 1551)
- August 23 – Bastianino, Italian painter (b. c. 1536)
- September 14 – Jean Passerat, French writer (b. 1534)
- September 25
  - Caspar Peucer, German reformer (b. 1525)
  - William Redman, Bishop of Norwich (b. 1541)
- September 30 – Catherine of Brandenburg-Küstrin, daughter of Margrave John of Küstrin (b. 1549)
- October – Thomas Morley, English composer (b. 1557)
- October 1 – Hernando de Cabezón, Spanish composer and organist (b. 1541)
- October 7 – Thomas Schweicker, German artist (b. 1540)
- October 13 – Franciscus Junius, French theologian (b. 1545)
- October 20 – Walter Leveson, English Elizabethan Member of Parliament, Shropshire landowner (b. 1550)
- October 21
  - Hedwig of Brandenburg, Duchess of Brunswick-Wolfenbüttel, Duchess consort of Brunswick-Wolfenbüttel (b. 1540)
  - King David I of Kakheti (b. 1569)
- October 28 – John, Prince of Schleswig-Holstein, youngest son of Frederick II of Denmark and Norway (b. 1583)
- October 30 – Jean-Jacques Boissard, French antiquary and Latin poet (b. 1528)
- October 31 – Dominic Collins, Irish Jesuit lay brother and martyr (b. 1566)
- November 23 – Agnes of Solms-Laubach, Landgravine of Hesse-Kassel (b. 1578)
- November 29 – Anthony Holborne, English composer (b. c. 1545)
- December 1 – Kobayakawa Hideaki, Japanese samurai and warlord (b. 1577)
- December 29 – Jacopo Corsi, Italian composer (b. 1561)
- Epifani Olives i Terès, Spanish politician
- Oda Ujiharu, Japanese warlord (b. 1534)
- Valpuri Innamaa, Finnish shipowner
- Daniel Tossanus, French Reformed theologian (b. 1541)

1603

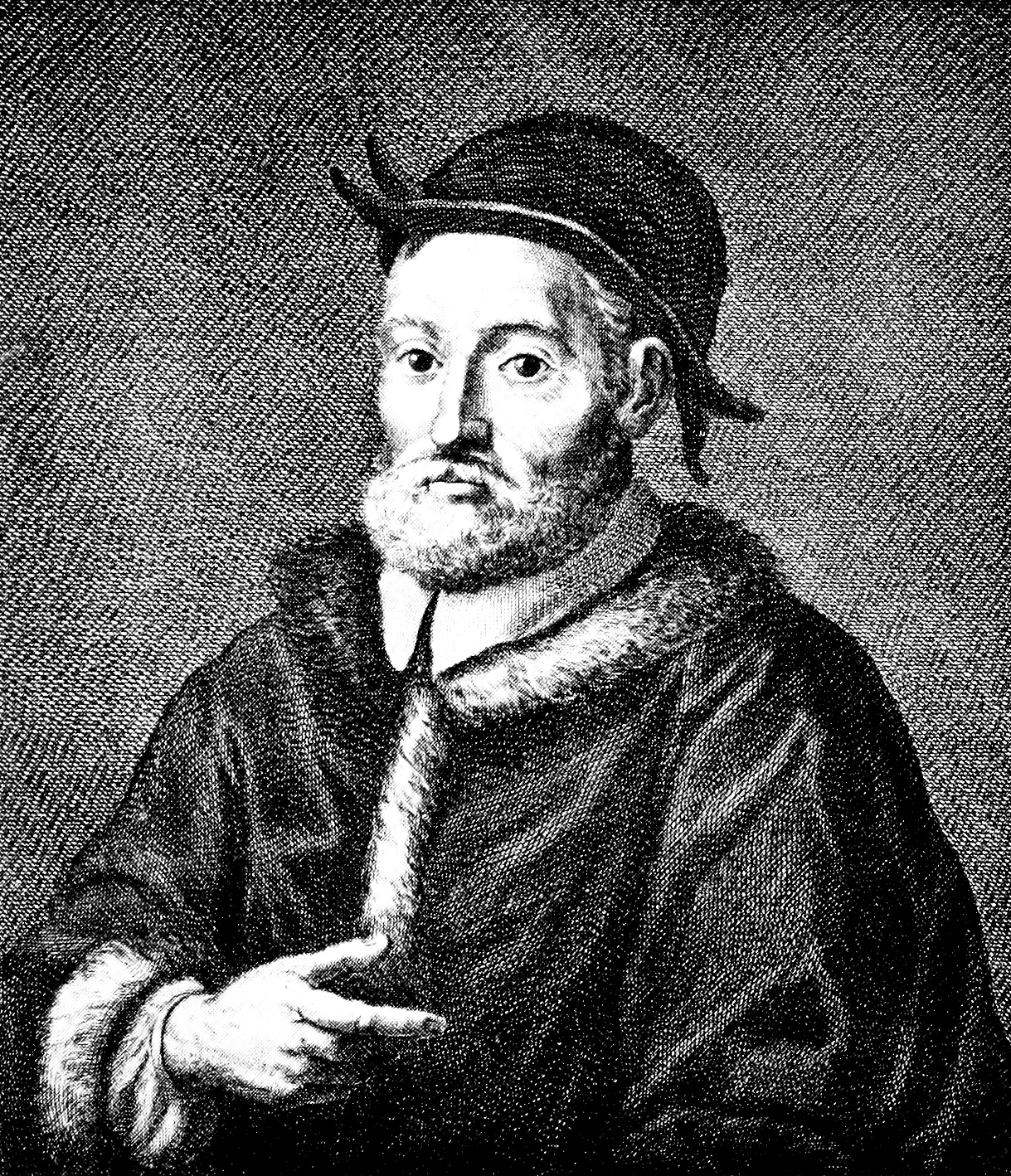
Andrea Cesalpino

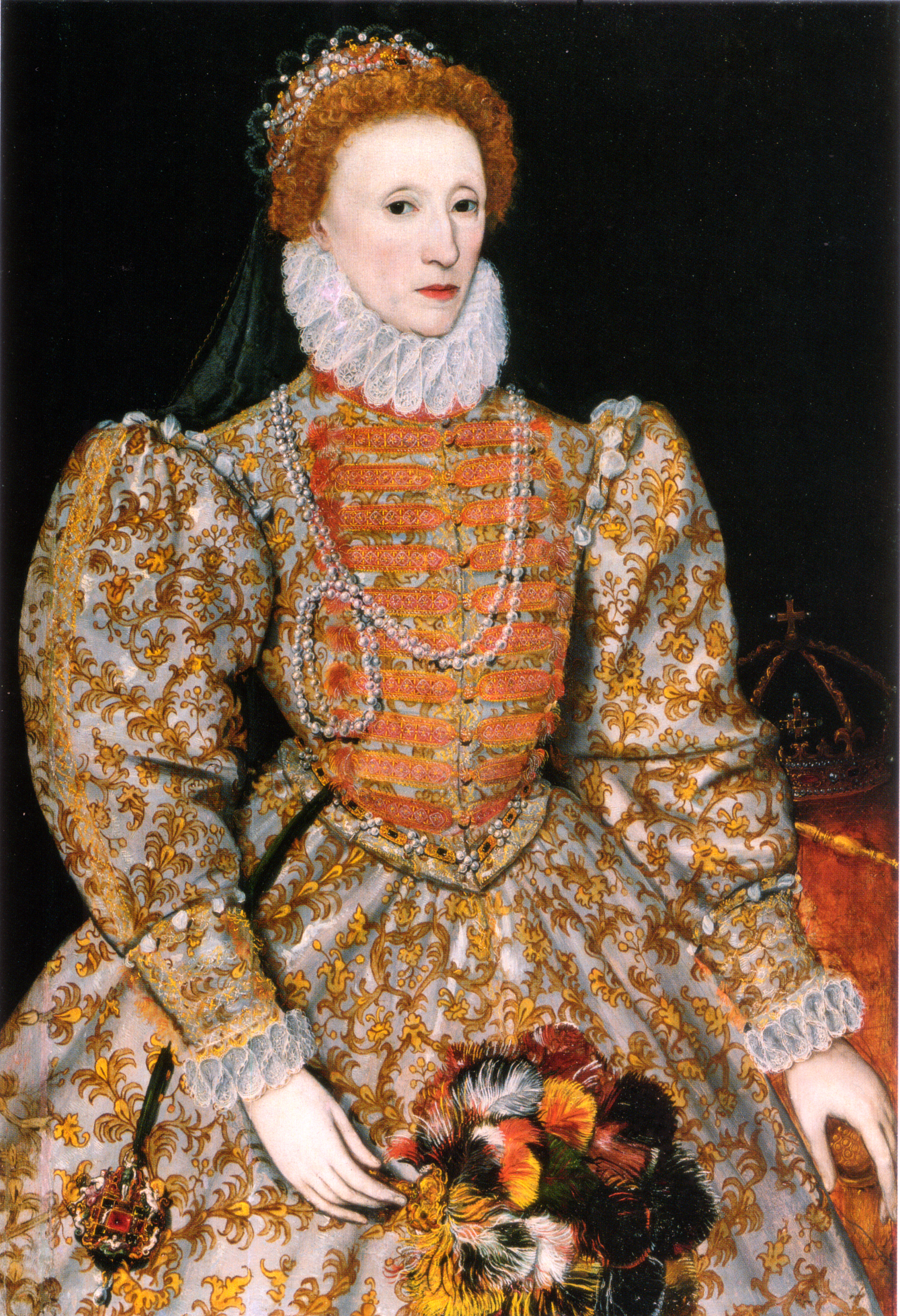
Elizabeth I of England

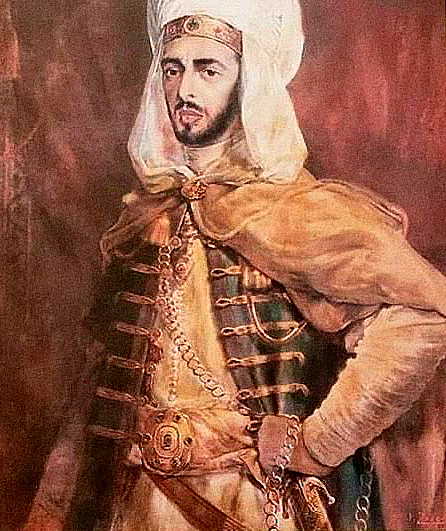
Ahmad al-Mansur

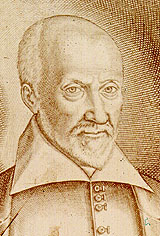
Pierre Charron

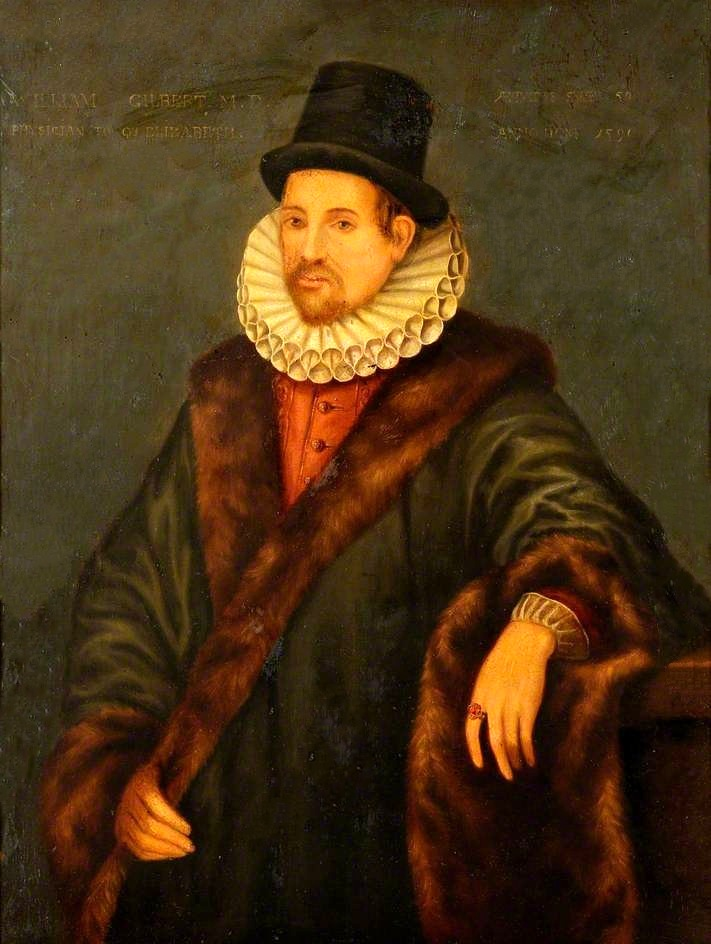
William Gilbert

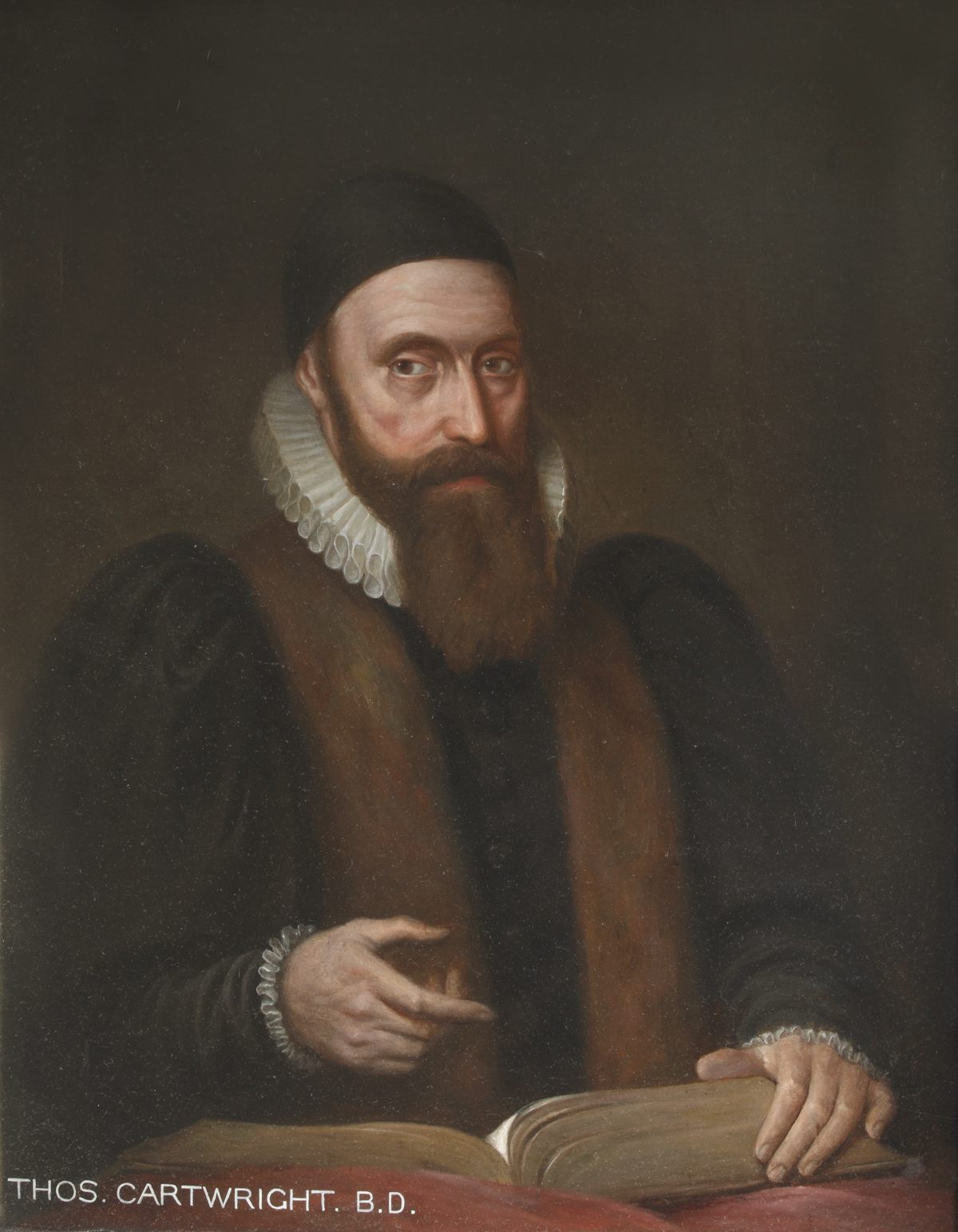
Thomas Cartwright

- January 21 – Kim Myŏngwŏn, Korean politician (b. 1534)
- January 25 – Francesco Zirano, Italian priest, member of the Order of Friars Minor (b. 1564)
- February 7
  - Bartholomäus Sastrow, German politician (b. 1520)
  - Hermann Wilken, German humanist and mathematician (b. 1522)
- February 23
  - Andrea Cesalpino, Italian philosopher, physician and botanist (b. 1519)
  - Franciscus Vieta, French mathematician (b. 1540)
- February 26 – Maria of Austria, Holy Roman Empress, spouse of Maximilian II (b. 1528)
- March 14 – Ulrich, Duke of Mecklenburg-Güstrow (1555–1603) (b. 1527)
- March 22 – Robert Seton, 1st Earl of Winton, Scottish peer who supported Mary, Queen of Scots (b. 1553)
- March 24 – Queen Elizabeth I of England (b. 1533)
- March 25 – Ikoma Chikamasa, Japanese warlord (b. 1526)
- April 4 – Aegidius Hunnius, German theologian (b. 1550)
- April 25 – George Frederick, Margrave of Brandenburg-Ansbach (b. 1539)
- May 4
  - Juraj IV Zrinski, Count of Croatia (b. 1549)
  - Stephan Praetorius, German theologian (b. 1536)
- May 14 – Magnus II, Duke of Saxe-Lauenburg, German duke (b. 1543)
- June – Baldassare Donato, Italian composer and singer (b. 1525)
- June 2
  - Tanneke Sconyncx, Alleged Flemish witch (b. 1560)
  - Bernard of Wąbrzeźno, Roman Catholic priest and a Benedictine monk from the Benedictine Abbey in Lubiń (b. 1575)
- June 27 – Jan Dymitr Solikowski, Polish archbishop, writer, and diplomat (b. 1539)
- July 4 – Philippe de Monte, Flemish composer (b. 1521)
- July 10 – Joan Terès i Borrull, viceroy of Catalonia (b. 1538)
- July 11 – Richard Drake, English courtier (b. 1535)
- July 17
  - János Jacobinus, Hungarian politician (b. 1574)
  - Mózes Székely, Hungarian noble (b. 1553)
- July 23 – Santi di Tito, Italian painter (b. 1536)
- August 1 – Matthew Browne, English politician (b. 1563)
- August 2 – John Townshend, English politician (b. 1568)
- August 16 – Silvio Antoniano, Italian Catholic cardinal (b. 1540)
- August 25
  - Ahmad al-Mansur, Sultan of the Saadi Dynasty (b. 1549)
  - Jan Zborowski, Polish noble (b. 1538)
- August 26 – Thomas Drury, English government informer and swindler (b. 1551)
- September 1 – Barnim X, Duke of Pomerania-Stettin (1569–1603) (b. 1549)
- September 9 – George Carey, 2nd Baron Hunsdon, English politician (b. 1547)
- September 19 – Matsudaira Iemoto, Japanese samurai (b. 1548)
- October – Ralph Lane, English explorer (b. 1530)
- October 6 – Jakob Monau, Polish writer and linguist (b. 1546)
- October 18 – Edward Stafford, 3rd Baron Stafford, English baron (b. 1535)
- October 23 – Johann Wanning, Dutch composer, kapellmeister, and singer (b. 1537)
- October 26 – Otto II, Duke of Brunswick-Harburg (1549–1603) (b. 1528)
- October 27 – Irina Godunova, Russian tsarina (b. 1557)
- November 12 – John VII, Count of Oldenburg (1573–1603) and Delmenhorst (1573–1597) (b. 1540)
- November 16 – Pierre Charron, French 16th-century Catholic theologian and philosopher (b. 1541)
- November 18 – Elisabeth of Nassau-Dillenburg, Dutch countess, sister of William the Silent (b. 1542)
- November 20 – Krzysztof Mikołaj "the Thunderbolt" Radziwiłł, Polish nobleman (b. 1547)
- November 30 – William Gilbert, English scientist (plague) (b. 1544)
- December 4 – Maerten de Vos, Flemish painter and draughtsman (b. 1532)
- December 5 – George Brooke, English aristocrat (b. 1568)
- December 8 – Girolamo Mattei, Italian Catholic cardinal (b. 1547)
- December 9 – William Watson, English conspirator (b. 1559)
- December 22 – Mehmed III, Ottoman Sultan (b. 1566)
- December 27 – Thomas Cartwright, English Puritan churchman (b. 1535)
- December 28 – John Joscelyn, English clergyman and antiquarian as well as secretary to Matthew Parker (b. 1529)
- Edward Fenton, English navigator
- Oleksander Ostrogski, Polish nobleman (b. 1571)
- Gráinne O'Malley, Irish chieftain and pirate (b. 1530)
- King Idris Alooma of the Kanem-Bornu Empire
- Will Kempe, English comic performer

1604

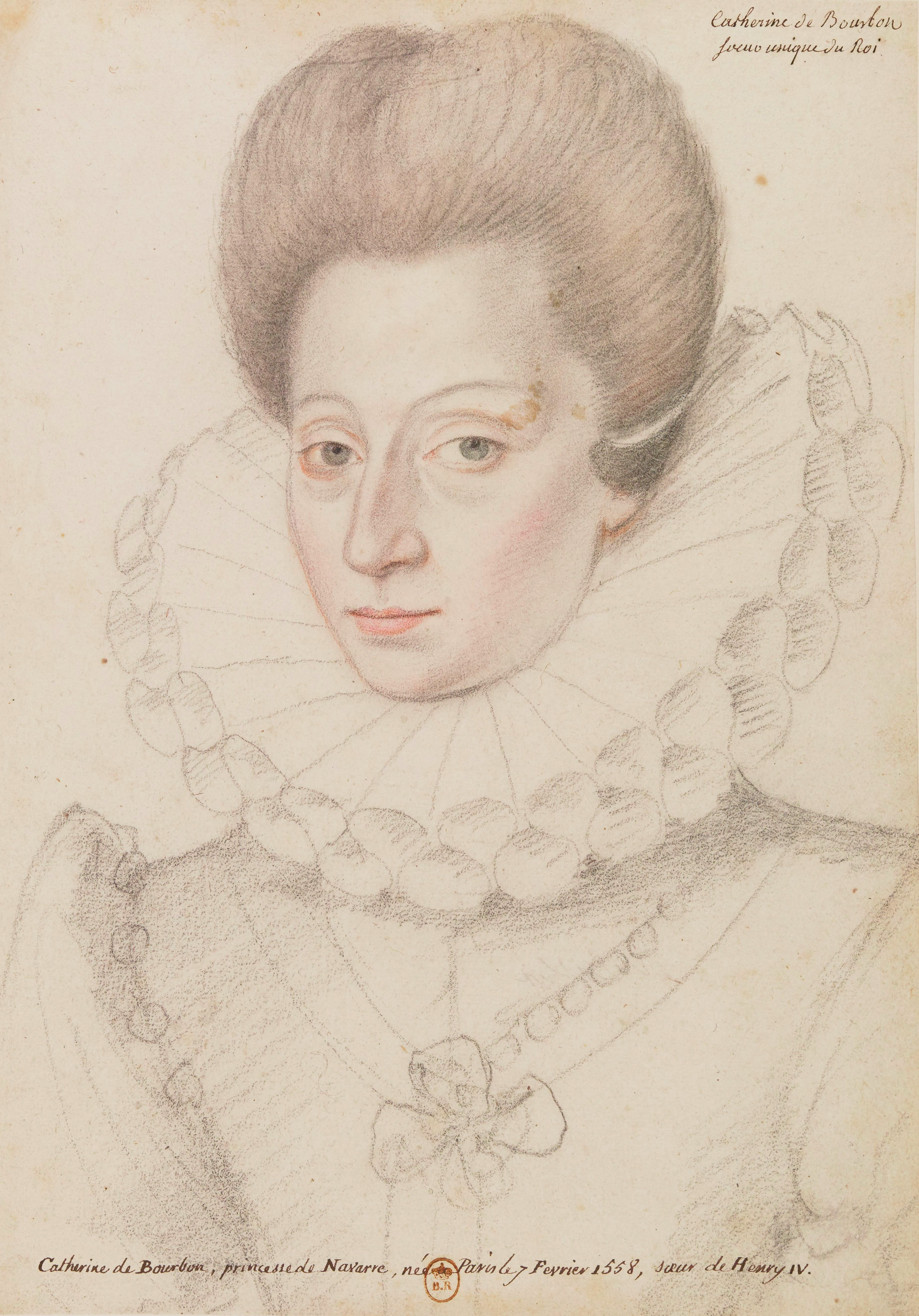
Catherine de Bourbon

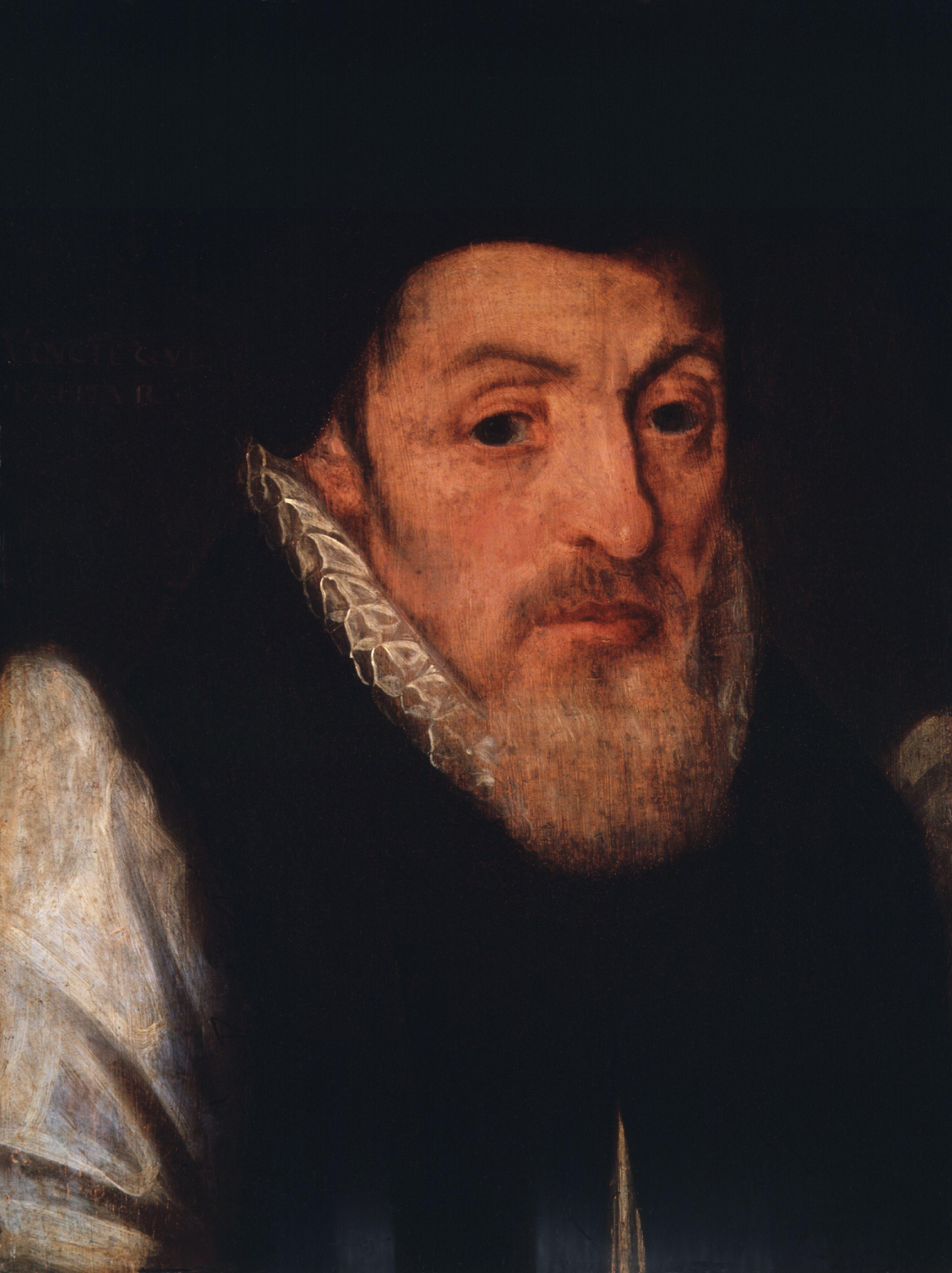
John Whitgift

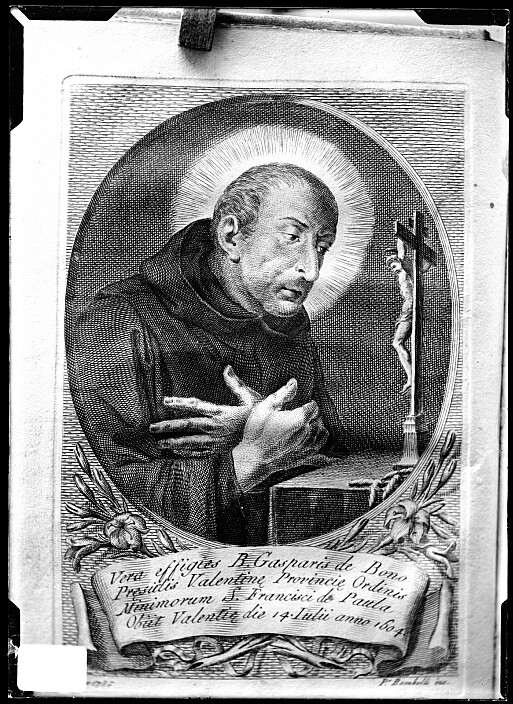
Gaspar de Bono

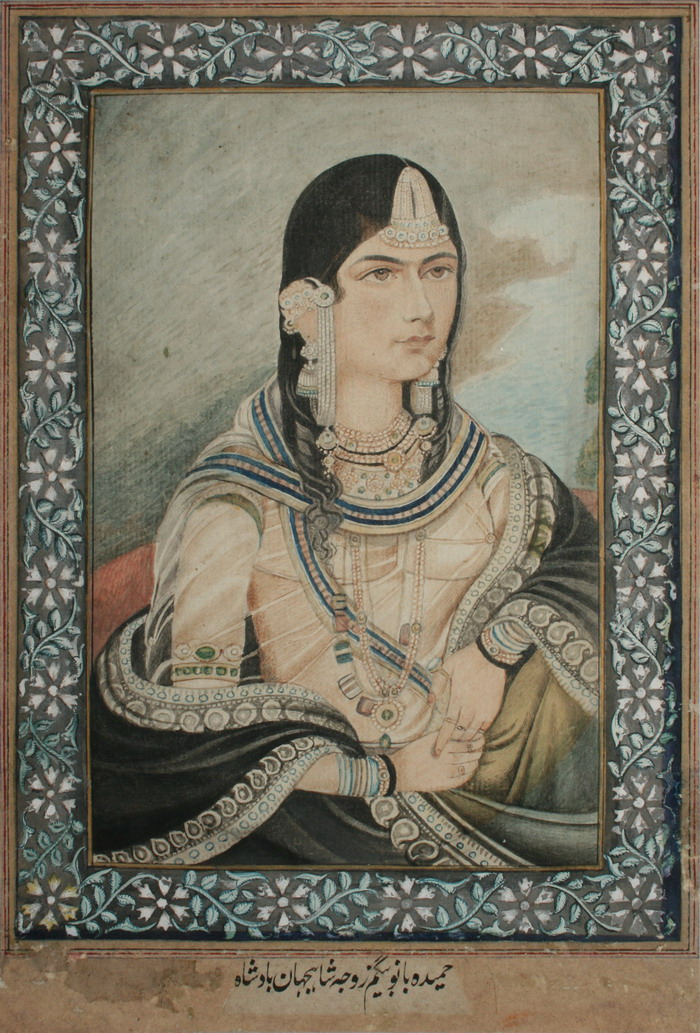
Hamida Banu Begum

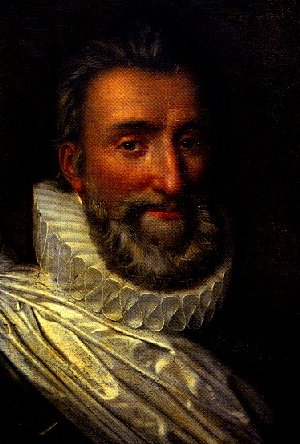
Ercole, Lord of Monaco

- January 4 – Ferenc Nádasdy, Hungarian noble (b. 1555)
- January 10 – Juliana of Lazarevo, Russian saint (b. 1530)
- January 17 – Santino Garsi da Parma, Italian musician (b. 1542)
- January 18 – Dorothy Catherine of Brandenburg-Ansbach, Burggräfin of Meissen (b. 1538)
- January 23 – Hyujeong, Korean Seon master (b. 1520)
- February 9 – Anne Russell, Countess of Warwick, wife of Ambrose Dudley, 3rd Earl of Warwick (b. 1548)
- February 10 – Cyriacus Spangenberg, German theologian and historian (b. 1528)
- February 13 – Catherine de Bourbon, French princess (b. 1559)
- February 24 – Christoph Pezel, German theologian (b. 1539)
- February 29 – John Whitgift, Archbishop of Canterbury from 1583 to his death (b. c. 1530)
- March 4 – Fausto Paolo Sozzini, Italian theologian (b. 1539)
- March 13 – Arnaud d'Ossat, French diplomat and writer (b. 1537)
- April 8 – Daniyal, Imperial Prince of the Timurid Dynasty, Viceroy of Deccan (b. 1572)
- April 14 – Ernest Frederick, Margrave of Baden-Durlach (1584–1604) (b. 1560)
- April 19 – Kuroda Yoshitaka, Japanese daimyō (b. 1546)
- April 21 – Koide Hidemasa, Samurai (b. 1539)
- April 25 – Pietro de' Medici, Italian noble (b. 1554)
- May 4 – Claudio Merulo, Italian composer (b. 1533)
- May 13 – Christine of Hesse (b. 1543)
- May 22 – Peter Ernst I von Mansfeld-Vorderort, Governor of the Habsburg Netherlands (b. 1517)
- May 26 – Godfrey Goldsborough, English bishop (b. 1548)
- June 5 – Thomas Muffet, English naturalist and physician (b. 1553)
- June 10 – Isabella Andreini, Italian actress (b. 1562)
- June 21 – Jonathan Trelawny, English politician (b. 1568)
- June 24 – Edward de Vere, 17th Earl of Oxford, Lord Great Chamberlain of England, poet and possibly playwright (b. 1550)
- July 14 – Gaspar de Bono, Beatified Spanish Army veteran and Minim friar (b. 1530)
- August 3 – Bernardino de Mendoza, Spanish military commander
- August 8 – Horio Tadauji, Japanese warlord (b. 1578)
- August 12 – John I, Count Palatine of Zweibrücken (b. 1550)
- August 20 – Toda Kazuaki, Japanese samurai (b. 1542)
- August 29
  - Hamida Banu Begum, wife of the Mughal emperor Humayun (b. 1527)
  - Otto Henry, Count Palatine of Sulzbach, Counts Palatine of Sulzbach (b. 1556)
- August 30 – John Juvenal Ancina, Italian Oratorian and bishop (b. 1545)
- September 10 – William Morgan, Welsh Bible translator (b. 1545)
- September 12 – Louis Gunther of Nassau, Count of Nassau-Katzenelnbogen (b. 1575)
- September 17 – Lucas Osiander the Elder, German pastor (b. 1534)
- September 22 – Dorothy Stafford, English noble (b. 1526)
- September 23 – Gabriel Vásquez, Spanish theologian (b. 1549)
- October 8 – Janus Dousa, Dutch historian and noble (b. 1545)
- October 9
  - Louis IV, Landgrave of Hesse-Marburg, German noble (b. 1537)
  - William Peryam, British judge (b. 1534)
- October 18 – Igram van Achelen, Dutch statesman (b. 1528)
- October 22 – Domingo Báñez, Spanish theologian (b. 1528)
- October 24 – Za Dengel, Emperor of Ethiopia
- October 25 – Claude de La Trémoille, French noble (b. 1566)
- November – Thomas Storer, English poet (b. 1571)
- November 21 – John Thynne, English landowner and politician (b. 1555)
- November 23
  - Olbracht Łaski, Polish alchemist (b. 1527)
  - Francesco Barozzi, Italian mathematician (b. 1537)
- November 29 – Ercole, Lord of Monaco, Monegasque noble (b. 1562)
- December 30 – George Hastings, 4th Earl of Huntingdon, English nobleman (b. 1540)
- Thomas Churchyard, English author, secretary to Edward de Vere (b. 1520)
- Thomas North, English translator of Plutarch (b. 1535)
- Richard Topcliffe, English politician and torturer (b. 1531)
- Ma Shouzhen, Chinese Gējì, painter, poet, and playwright (b. 1548)

1605

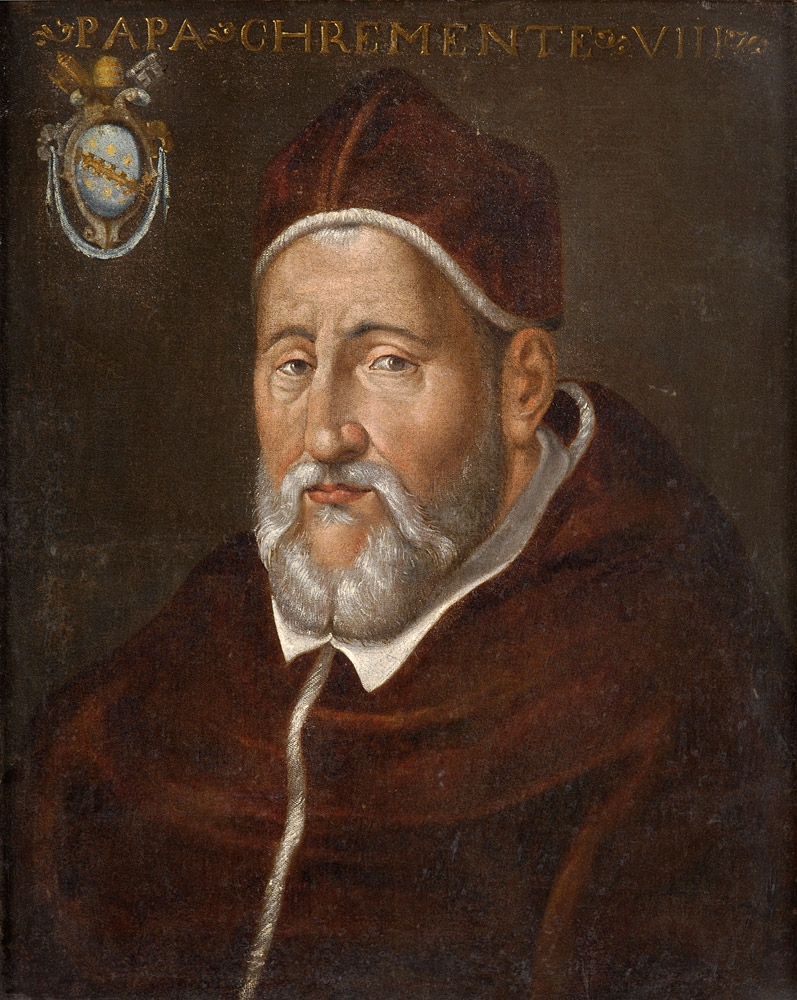
Pope Clement VIII

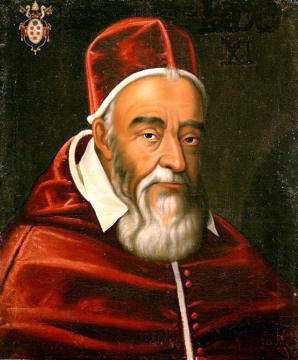
Pope Leo XI

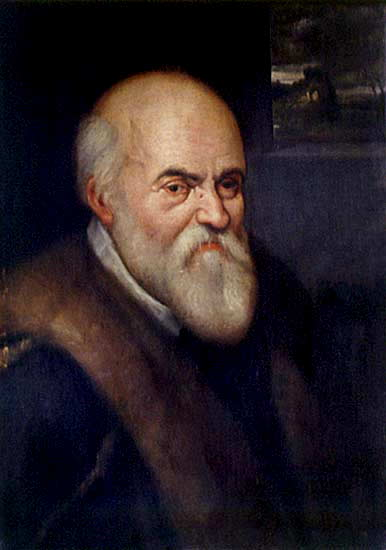
Ulisse Aldrovandi

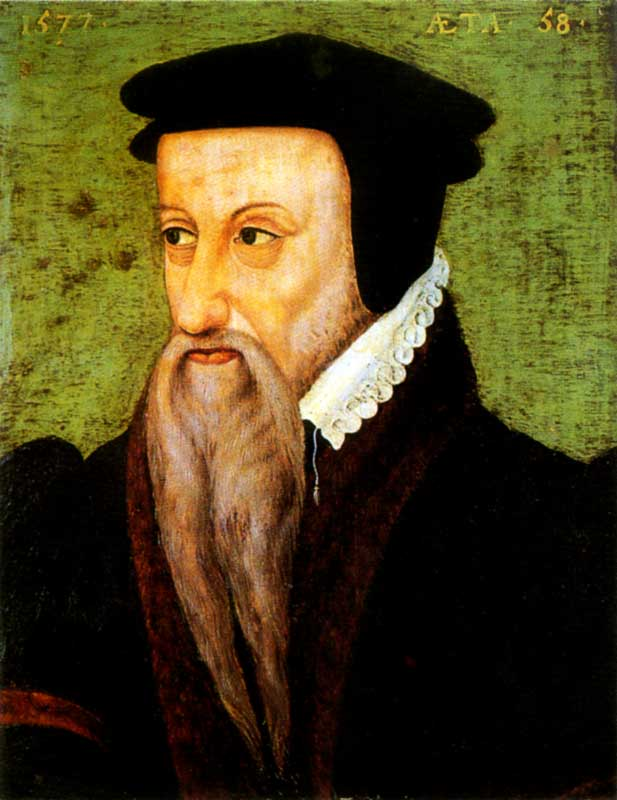
Theodore Beza

- January 16 – Eitel Friedrich IV, Count of Hohenzollern (b. 1545)
- February 5 – Edward Stafford, English diplomat (b. 1552)
- February 15 – Maria of Hanau-Münzenberg, German noblewoman (b. 1562)
- February 19 – Orazio Vecchi, Italian composer (b. 1550)
- February 24 – Girolamo Simoncelli, Italian Catholic cardinal (b. 1522)
- February 26 – George III, Count of Erbach-Breuberg (1564–1605) (b. 1548)
- March 5 – Pope Clement VIII (b. 1536)
- March 12 – King Alexander II of Kakheti (b. 1527)
- March 17 – Pieter Bast, Dutch cartographer, engraver and draftsman (b. 1550)
- April 5 – Adam Loftus, English Catholic archbishop (b. c. 1533)
- April 6 – John Stow, English historian and antiquarian (b. 1525)
- April 10 – Albrecht VII, Count of Schwarzburg-Rudolstadt (b. 1537)
- April 13 – Boris Godunov, Tsar of Russia (b. 1551)
- April 14 – Francis Cherry, English diplomat (b. 1552)
- April 25 – Naresuan, Siamese King of Ayutthaya kingdom (b. c. 1555)
- April 27 – Pope Leo XI (b. 1535)
- May 4 – Ulisse Aldrovandi, Italian naturalist (b. 1522)
- May 10 – Casimir VI, Duke of Pomerania, Lutheran Administrator of Cammin Prince-Bishopric (b. 1557)
- June 3 – Jan Zamoyski, Polish nobleman (b. 1542)
- June 9 – John Louis II, Count of Nassau-Wiesbaden-Idstein (1596–1605) (b. 1596)
- June 20 – Tsar Feodor II of Russia (b. 1589)
- July 2 – Louis I, Count of Sayn-Wittgenstein (1588–1605) (b. 1532)
- July 18 – Johann II, Duke of Saxe-Weimar, German duke (b. 1570)
- July 26 – Rev. Fr. Miguel de Benavides, O.P., Spanish clergyman and sinologist (b. 1552)
- August 2 – Richard Leveson, English admiral (b. c. 1570)
- August 4 – Charles I, Duke of Elbeuf, French duke and nobleman (b. 1556)
- September 9 – Heinrich Khunrath, German physician (b. 1560)
- September 11 – Sir Thomas Tresham, English politician (b. 1550)
- September 14 – Jan Tarnowski, Archbishop of Kraków (b. 1550)
- September 19 – Edward Lewknor, English politician (b. 1542)
- September 23 – Pontus de Tyard, French poet (b. c. 1521)
- September 24 – Manuel Mendes, Portuguese composer (b. 1547)
- October 13 – Theodore Beza, French theologian (b. 1519)
- October 18 – Beate Clausdatter Bille, Danish noblewoman (b. 1526)
- October 22 – King Constantine I of Kakheti (b. 1567)
- October 27 – Akbar The Great, Mughal emperor (b. 1542)
- October 30 – George Clifford, 3rd Earl of Cumberland, English noble (b. 1558)
- October 31 – Dorothy Bray, Baroness Chandos, English noble (b. 1524)
- November 5 – Nyaungyan Min, Burmese king (b. 1555)
- November 8 – Robert Catesby, English conspirator (b. 1573)
- November 9 – Handan Sultan, Valide Sultan, mother of Ahmed I of Ottoman Empire (b.1568)
- November 12 – Jan Tomasz Drohojowski, Polish noble (b. 1535)
- November 14 – Anna Maria of Anhalt, German noblewoman (b. 1561)
- December – Francis Tresham, English conspirator (b. 1567)
- December 3 – Guy XX de Laval, French noble (b. 1585)
- December 6 – Murai Nagayori, Japanese samurai (b. 1543)
- December 25 – Marino Grimani, Doge of Venice (b. 1532)
- December 29 – John Davis, English explorer (b. 1550)
- Marek Sobieski, Polish nobleman (b. 1549)

1606

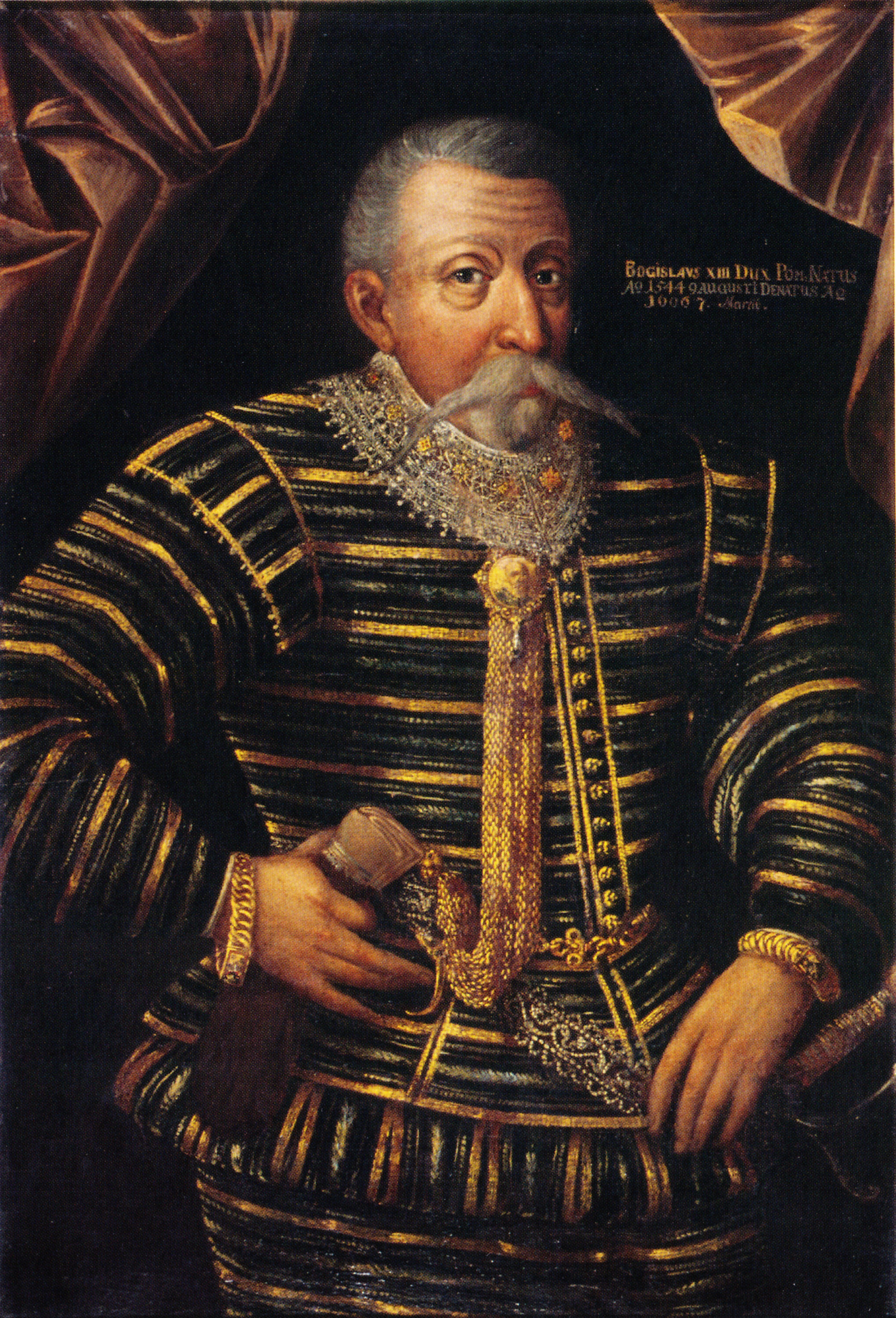
Bogislaw XIII, Duke of Pomerania

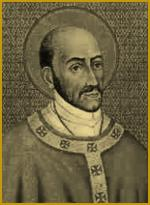
Turibius of Mogrovejo

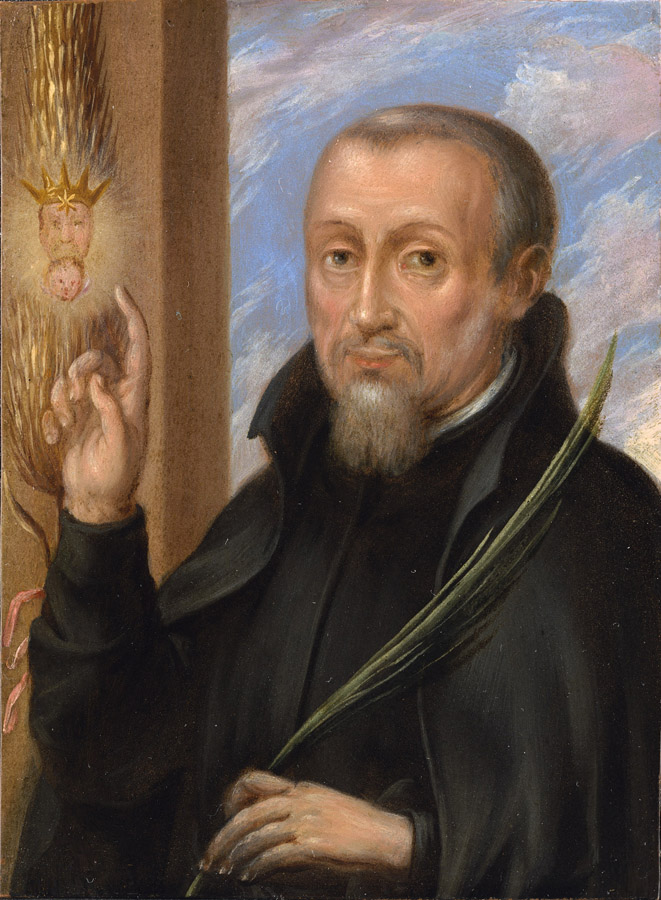
Henry Garnet

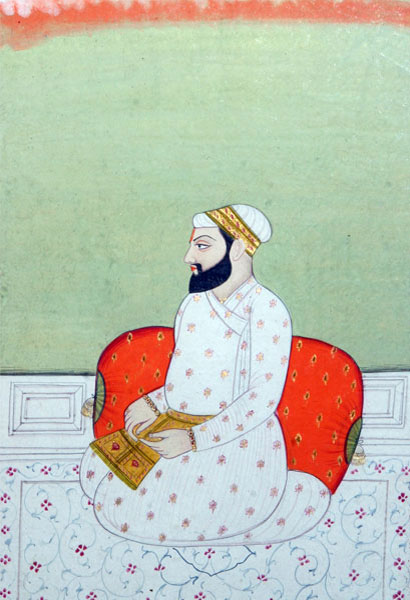
Guru Arjan

- January 4 – George Villiers, English knight (b. 1544)
- January 6 – Antonio Fernández de Córdoba y Cardona, Spanish diplomat (b. 1550)
- January 11 – Arnold III, Count of Bentheim-Steinfurt-Tecklenburg-Limburg, Lord of Rheda (b. 1554)
- January 20 – Sibylle Elisabeth of Württemberg, Duchess consort of Saxony (b. 1584)
- January 29 – Edward Tyrrell, English politician (b. 1551)
- January 30
  - Thomas Bates, English Catholic involved in 1605 Gunpowder Plot (executed) (b. 1567)
  - Everard Digby, English conspirator (executed) (b. 1578)
  - John Grant, Gunpowder plotter (b. 1570)
  - Robert Wintour, English conspirator (executed) (b. 1568)
- January 31
  - Guy Fawkes, English conspirator (executed) (b. 1570)
  - Robert Keyes, English criminal (b. 1565)
  - Ambrose Rokewood, English conspirator (executed)
  - Thomas Wintour, English conspirator (executed) (b. 1571)
- February 21 – Richard Field, English Jesuit (b. 1554)
- March 2 – Martin Moller, German poet and mystic (b. 1547)
- March 6 – Philip of Hohenlohe-Neuenstein, Dutch army commander (b. 1550)
- March 7 – Bogislaw XIII, Duke of Pomerania-Stettin from 1603 to 1606 (b. 1544)
- March 10 – Emperor Yaqob of Ethiopia (killed in battle)
- March 15 – Balthasar von Dernbach, Prince-Abbot of Fulda (b. 1548)
- March 16 – Gaspar de Zúñiga y Acevedo, Count of Monterrey, Spanish colonial administrator and Viceroy of Mexico (b. 1540)
- March 23
  - Justus Lipsius, Flemish humanist (b. 1547)
  - Turibius of Mogrovejo, Spanish missionary Archbishop of Lima (b. 1538)
  - Saint Turibius de Mongrovejo, Spanish Grand Inquisitioner and missionary Archbishop of Lima (b. 1538)
- March 25 – François de Bar, French scholar (b. 1538)
- April 3 – Charles Blount, 1st Earl of Devon, English politician (b. 1563)
- April 7 – Edward Oldcorne, English martyr (b. 1561)
- April 16 – John Addey, English shipwright (b. 1550)
- May 3 – Henry Garnet, English Jesuit (executed) (b. 1555)
- May 17
  - False Dmitriy I, pretender to the Russian throne (b. 1582)
  - Niccolò Orlandini, Italian Jesuit writer (b. 1554)
- May 22 – José de Sigüenza, Spanish theologian (b. 1544)
- May 30 – Guru Arjan Dev, fifth of the Sikh gurus (executed) (b. 1563)
- July 7 – Christopher, Duke of Brunswick-Harburg, co-ruler of Brunswick-Lüneburg-Harburg (1603–1606) (b. 1570)
- July 28 – Antonio de Raya Navarrete, Spanish Catholic prelate who served as Bishop of Cuzco (1594–1606) (b. 1536)
- September 2 – Karel van Mander, Dutch painter and poet (b. 1548)
- September 3 – Juan de Borja y Castro, Spanish noble (b. 1533)
- September 9 – Leonhard Lechner, German composer and music editor (b. 1553)
- September 28 – Nicolaus Taurellus, German philosopher and theologian (b. 1547)
- October 5 – Philippe Desportes, French poet (b. 1546)
- October 8 – Johann VI, Count of Nassau-Dillenburg (b. 1536)
- November 8 – Girolamo Mercuriale, Italian philologist and physician (b. 1530)
- November 16 – Alderano Cybo-Malaspina, Italian nobleman (b. 1552)
- November 20 – (burial date) John Lyly, English writer (b. 1553)
- December 29 – Stephen Bocskay, Prince of Transylvania (b. 1557)
- Date unknown – Akaza Naoyasu, Japanese nobleman

1607

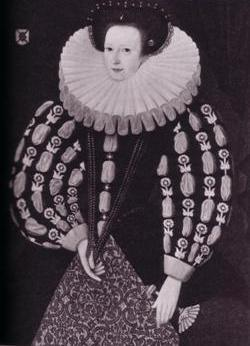
Anne Morgan, Baroness Hunsdon

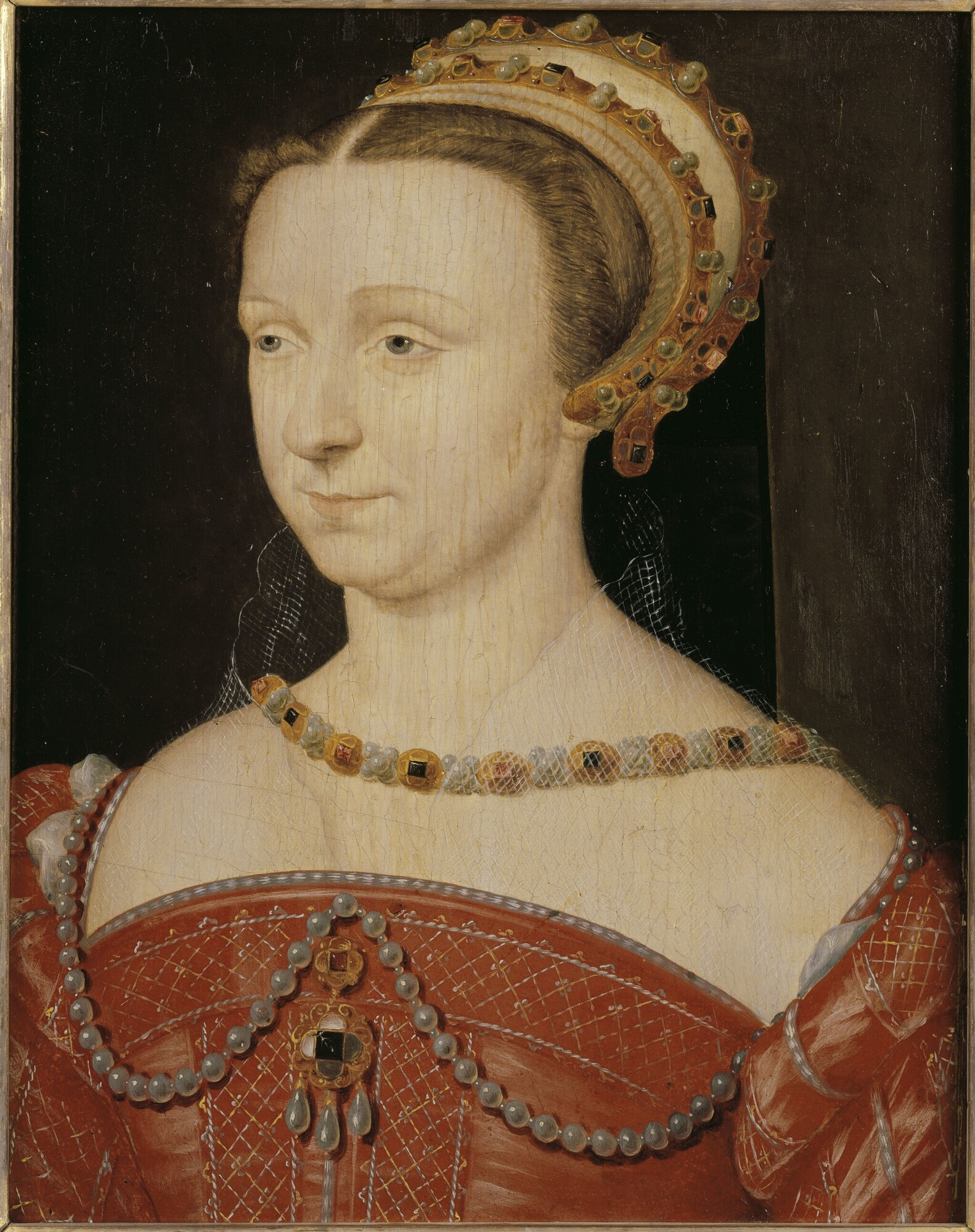
Anna d'Este

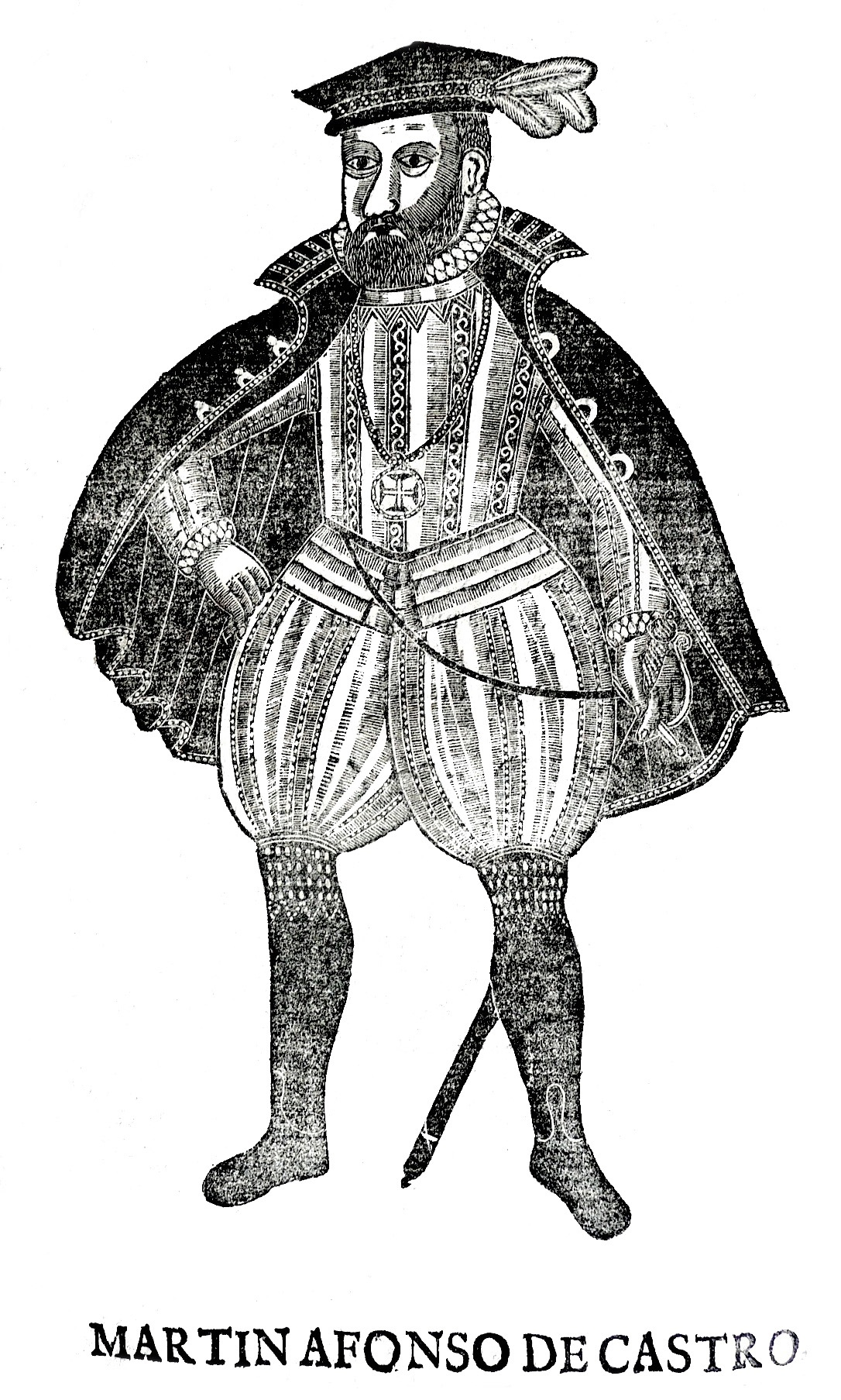
Martim Afonso de Castro

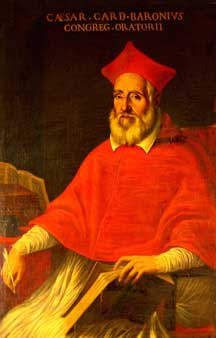
Caesar Baronius

- January 6 – Guidobaldo del Monte, Italian mathematician, astronomer and philosopher (b. 1545)
- January 12 – Mihály Káthay, Hungarian politician (b. c. 1565)
- January 19 – Anne Morgan, Baroness Hunsdon, English Baroness (b. 1529)
- January 25 – Anders Foss, Norwegian bishop (b. 1543)
- January 27 – Richard Lowther, English soldier and official (b. 1532)
- March 11 – Giovanni Maria Nanino, Italian composer (b. c. 1543)
- March 29 – Tsugaru Tamenobu, Japanese daimyō (b. 1550)
- March 31 – Henry Beaumont, English landowner and MP (b. 1545)
- April 6 – Jan Saenredam, Dutch engraver (b. 1565)
- April 9 – Eleanor of Prussia, daughter of Duke Albert Frederick of Prussia; by marriage Electress of Brandenburg (b. 1583)
- April 15
  - César de Bus, French Catholic priest (b. 1544)
  - Cornelis Kiliaan, 16th-century writer from the Southern Netherlands (b. 1528)
- April 27 – Edward Cromwell, 3rd Baron Cromwell, Governor of Lecale (b. 1560)
- May – Edward Dyer, English courtier and poet (b. 1543)
- May 3 – Agnes Douglas, Countess of Argyll, Scottish noblewoman (b. 1574)
- May 17 – Anna d'Este, French princess (b. 1531)
- May 21 – John Rainolds, English scholar and Bible translator (b. 1549)
- May 25 – Mary Magdalene de' Pazzi, Italian Carmelite nun and mystic (b. 1566)
- June 2 – Yūki Hideyasu, daimyō (b. 1574)
- June 3 – Martim Afonso de Castro, Portuguese Viceroy of India (b. 1560)
- June 7 – Johannes Matelart, composer (b. c. 1538)
- June 10 – John Popham, Lord Chief Justice of England (b. 1531)
- June 19
  - Johannes Bertelius, Luxembourgish historian (b. 1544)
  - Patriarch Job of Moscow
- June 28 – Domenico Fontana, Italian architect (b. 1543)
- June 30 – Caesar Baronius, Italian cardinal and historian (b. 1538)
- July 6 – Achille Gagliardi, Italian philosopher and theologian (b. 1537)
- July 7 – Penelope Blount, Countess of Devonshire, English noblewoman (b. 1563)
- July 12 – Thomas Legge, British writer (b. 1535)
- July 24 – Alessandro Pieroni, Italian painter (b. 1550)
- July 29 – Alexander Chocke of Avington, English politician (b. 1566)
- August 1 – Otto Casmann, German philosopher (b. 1562)
- August 22 – Bartholomew Gosnold, English explorer and privateer (b. 1571)
- August 29 – Ercole Sassonia, Italian physician (b. 1551)
- September 5 – Pomponne de Bellièvre, French politician (b. 1529)
- September 10 – Luzzasco Luzzaschi, Italian composer (b. 1545)
- September 16 – Mary Stuart, English-Scottish princess (b. 1605)
- September 22 – Alessandro Allori, Italian portrait painter of the late Mannerist Florentine school (b. 1535)
- October 16 – Hōzōin In'ei, Japanese Buddhist teacher (b. 1521)
- October 31 – Wawrzyniec Grzymała Goślicki, Polish philosopher (b. 1530)
- November 7 – Ana de Velasco y Girón, mother of King John IV of Portugal (b. 1585)
- November 8 – Elisabeth of Anhalt-Zerbst, Electress of Brandenburg (b. 1563)
- November 24 – Juan de la Cerda, 6th Duke of Medinaceli, Spanish noble (b. 1569)
- December 20 – Sir John Bourke of Brittas, Irish recusant, hanged (b. 1550)
- December 31 – Edmund Shakespeare, English actor, brother of William Shakespeare (b. 1580)
- Chen Lin, general of Ming dynasty China and Korea
- Henry Chettle, English writer (b. 1564)

1608

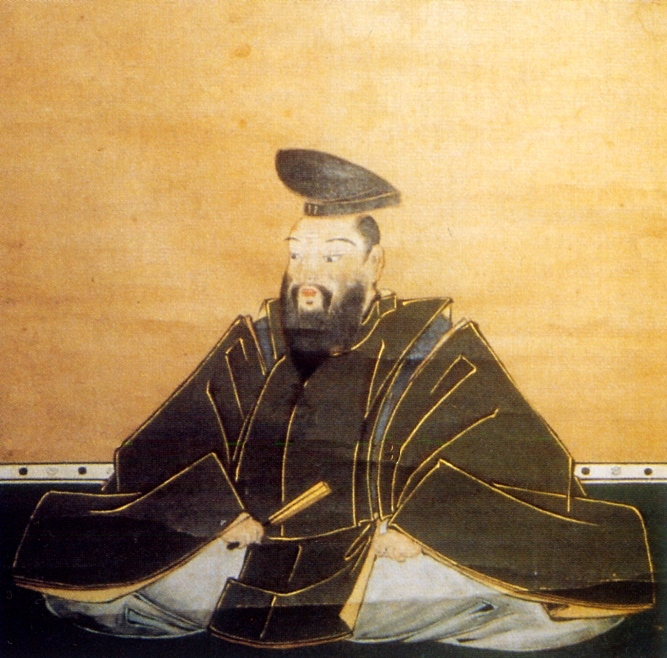
Tsugaru Tamenobu died 29 March

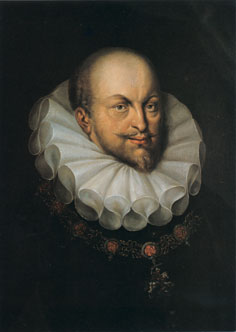
Frederick I, Duke of Württemberg died 29 January

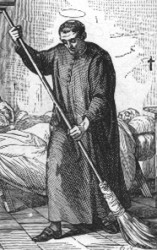
Francis Caracciolo died 4 June

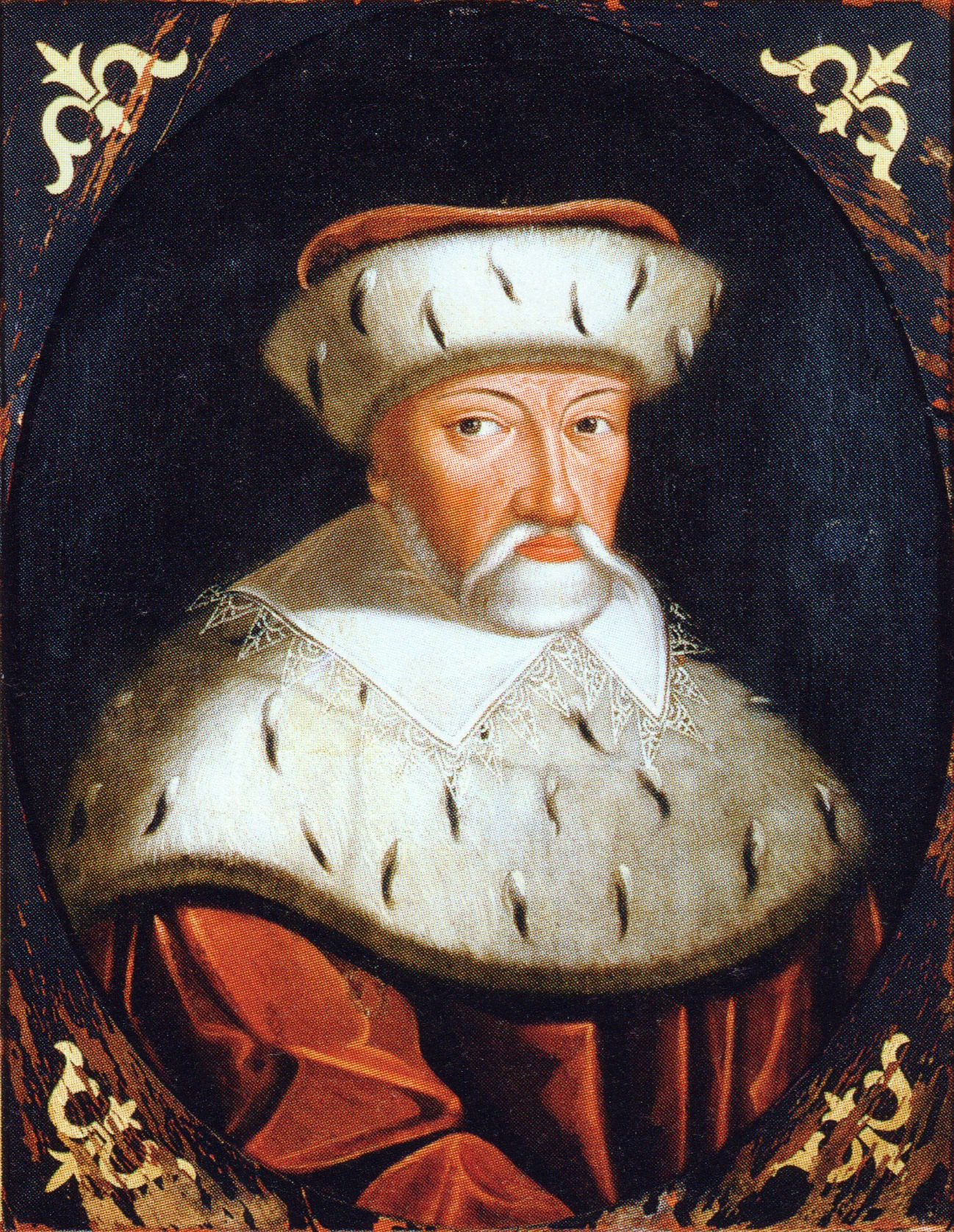
Joachim III Frederick, Elector of Brandenburg died 18 July

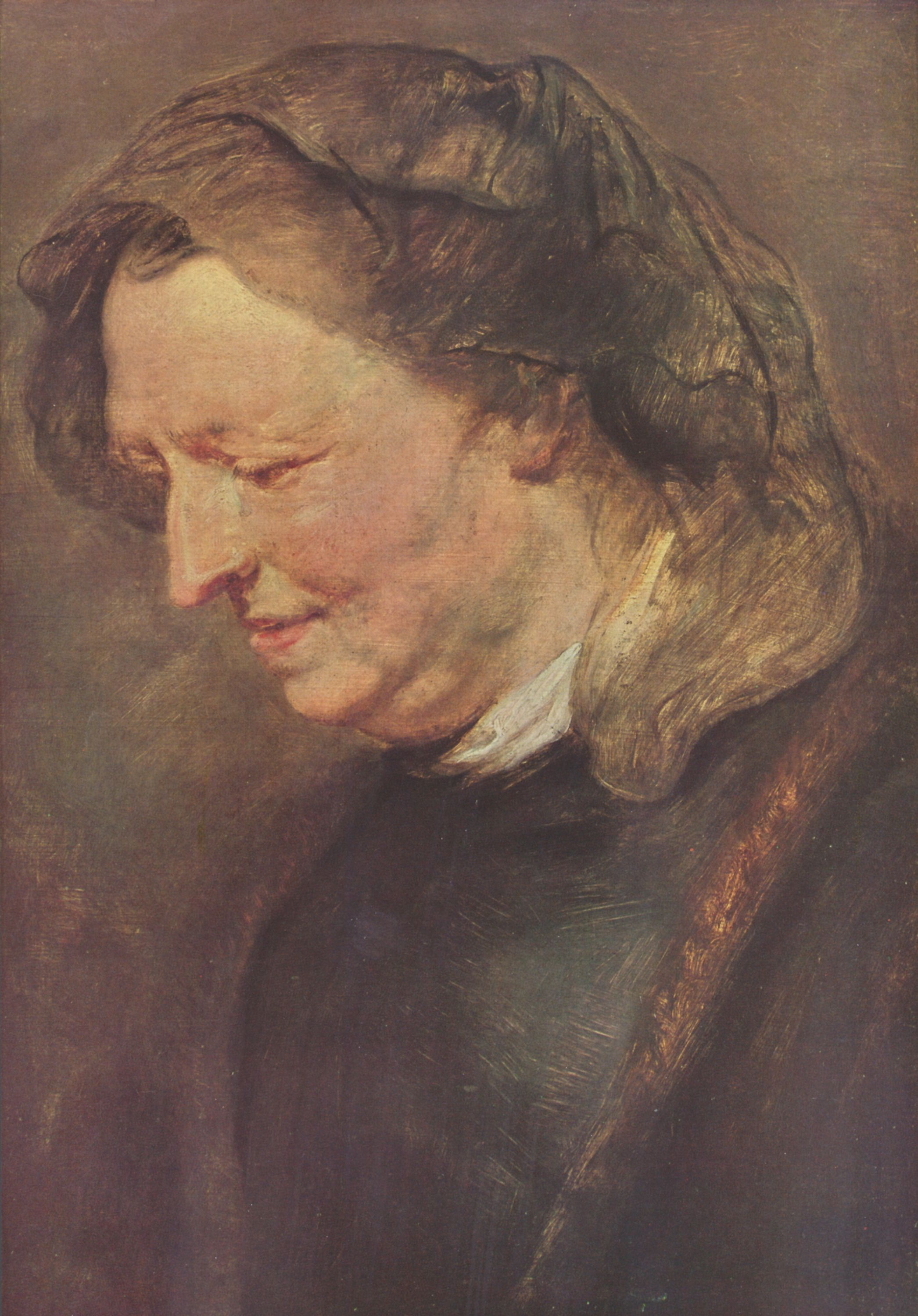
Maria Pypelinckx died 19 October

- January 4 – Peter Edgcumbe, English politician (b. 1536)
- January 18 – Jacques Couet, French pastor (b. 1546)
- January 19 – Bernard Maciejowski, Polish Catholic archbishop (b. 1548)
- January 28 – Enrique Henríquez, Portuguese theologian (b. 1536)
- January 29 – Frederick I, Duke of Württemberg, son of George of Mömpelgard and his wife Barbara of Hesse (b. 1557)
- February 13 – Konstanty Wasyl Ostrogski, Lithuanian prince (b. 1526)
- February 13 – Bess of Hardwick, Countess of Shrewsbury (b. 1527)
- February 26 – John Still, English Bishop of Bath and Wells, famed as a preacher (b. c. 1543)
- February 27 – Henri, Duke of Montpensier, French noble (b. 1573)
- March 12 – Kōriki Kiyonaga, Japanese warlord (b. 1530)
- March 16 – Seonjo of Joseon, King of Joseon (b. 1552)
- March 29
  - Laurence Tomson, English Calvinist theologian (b. 1539)
  - Tsugaru Tamenobu, Japanese daimyō (b. 1550)
- April 8 – Magdalen Dacre, English noble (b. 1538)
- April 9 – Pomponio Torelli, Italian writer (b. 1539)
- April 18 – Jakob Christoph Blarer von Wartensee, Roman Catholic bishop (b. 1542)
- April 19 – Thomas Sackville, 1st Earl of Dorset, English statesman and poet (b. 1536)
- April 29 – Maria Anna of Bavaria (b. 1551)
- May 11 – Giovanni Luca Conforti, Italian composer and singer (b. 1560)
- May 14 – Charles III, Duke of Lorraine (b. 1542)
- May 15 – Archibald Napier, Scottish landowner (b. 1534)
- May 22 – Juan Bautista Villalpando, Spanish architect and mathematician (b. 1552)
- June 1 – Marie Eleonore of Cleves, Duchess consort of Prussia (1573–1608) (b. 1550)
- June 4 – Francis Caracciolo, Italian Catholic priest (b. 1563)
- June 5 – Ippolito Andreasi, Italian painter (b. 1548)
- June 19
  - Alberico Gentili, Italian jurist (b. 1551)
  - Johann Pistorius, German historian (b. 1546)
- July 3 – William Barclay, Scottish academic lawyer (b. 1546)
- July 18 – Joachim Friedrich, Elector of Brandenburg (b. 1546)
- July 25 – Pomponio Nenna, Italian composer (b. 1556)
- July 30 – Rory O'Donnell, 1st Earl of Tyrconnell (b. 1575)
- August 13 – Giambologna, Italian sculptor (b. 1529)
- September 4 – Juan de Zúñiga y Avellaneda, Spanish nobleman (b. 1551)
- September 8 – Jerónimo Xavierre, Spanish cardinal (b. 1546)
- September 14 – Christoph Schissler, German scientific instrument maker (b. 1531)
- September 20 – Kanamori Nagachika, Japanese samurai (b. 1524)
- September 28 – Henri, Duke of Joyeuse, French general (b. 1563)
- October 11 – Giovanni Ambrogio Figino, Italian painter (b. c. 1549)
- October 17 – Luca Bati, Italian composer (b. 1546)
- October 19
  - Martin Delrio, Flemish theologian and occultist (b. 1551)
  - Geoffrey Fenton, English writer and politician (b. 1539)
  - Maria Pypelinckx, Dutch writer (b. 1538)
- October 26 – Philipp Nicolai, German Lutheran pastor (b. 1556)
- October 29 – John Smith, English politician (b. 1557)
- November 24 – Giovanni Battista Giorgi, Italian Catholic prelate who served as Bishop of Ston (1606–1608) (b. 1536)
- December 21 – William Davison, secretary to Queen Elizabeth I of England (b. c. 1541)
- December 29 – Martin Schalling the Younger, German theologian (b. 1532)
- George Bannatyne, collector of Scottish poems (b. 1545)

1609

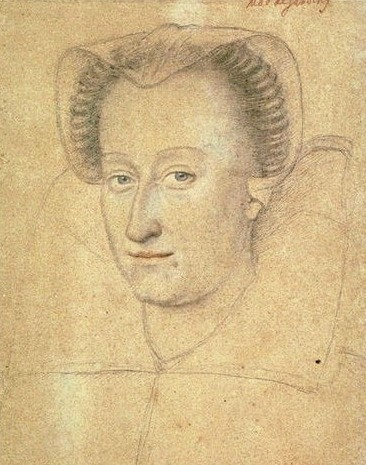
Isabelle de Limeuil

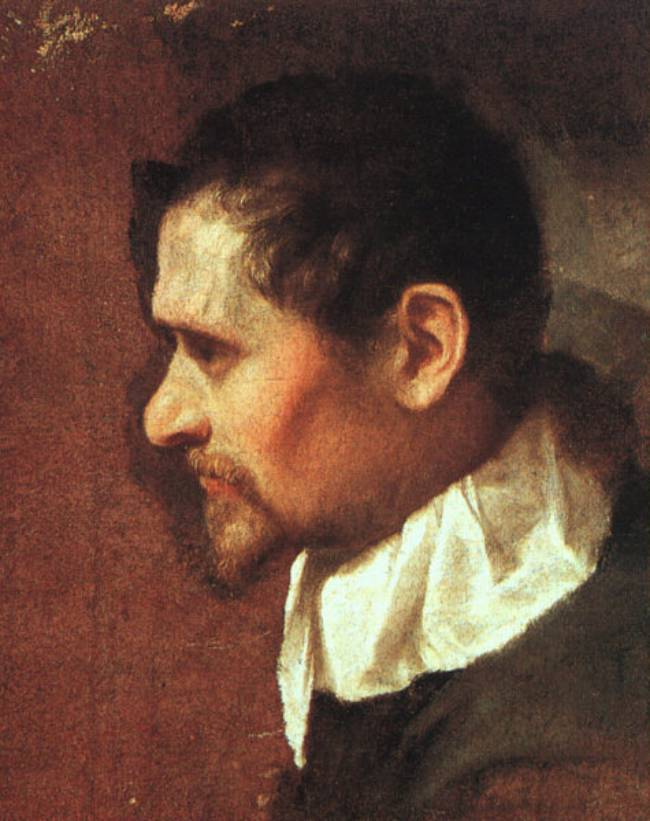
Annibale Carracci

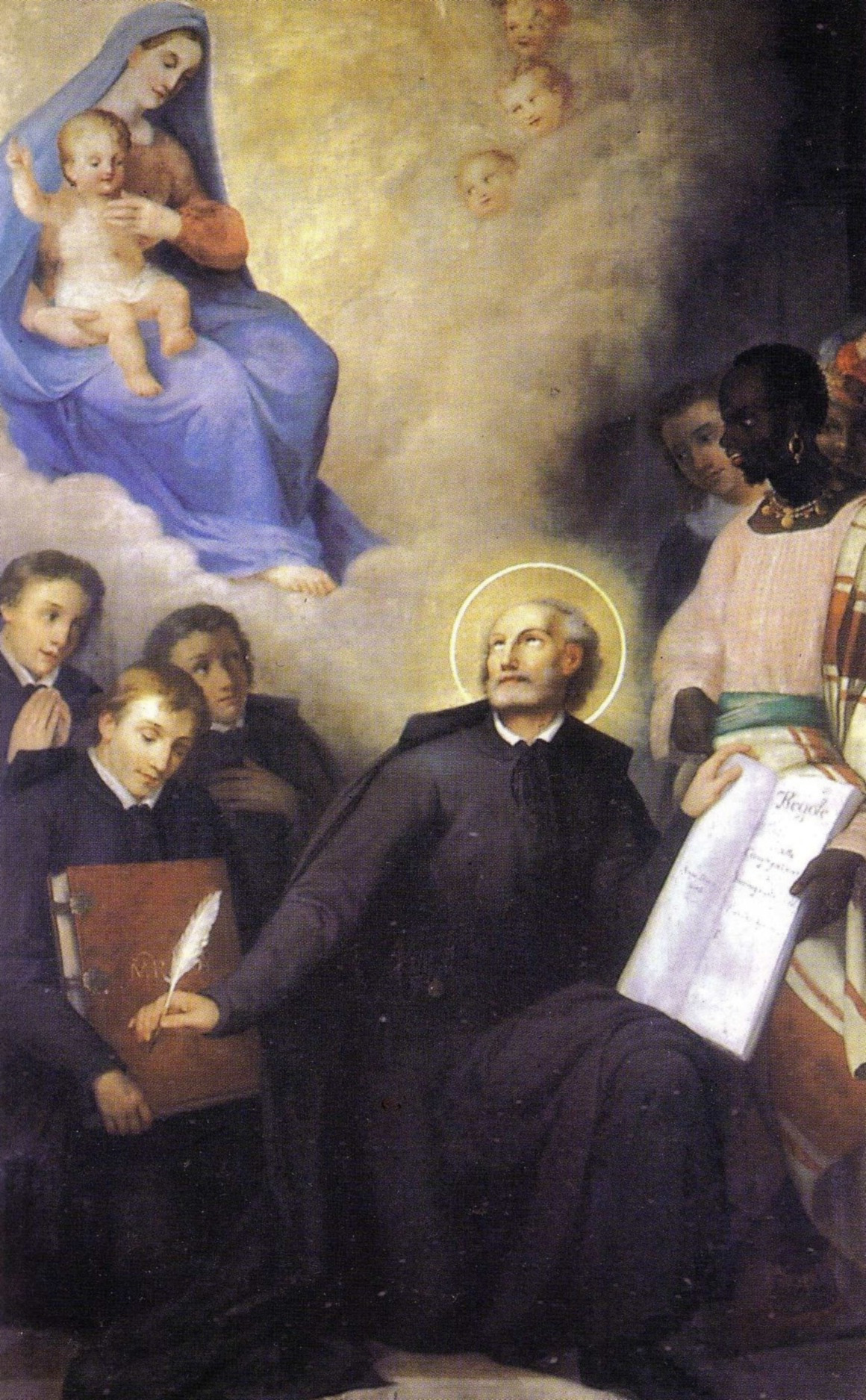
John Leonardi

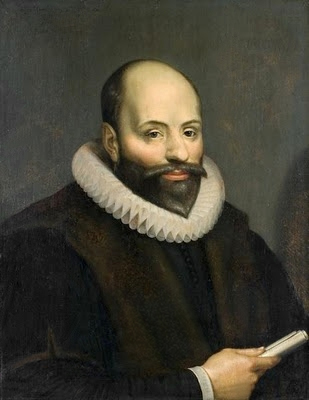
Jacobus Arminius

- January – Thomas East, English printer (born c. 1540)
- January 9 – Joannes Bochius, civic officeholder and neo-Latin poet in the city of Antwerp (b. 1555)
- January 21 – Joseph Justus Scaliger, French Protestant scholar (b. 1540)
- February 17 – Ferdinando I de' Medici, Grand Duke of Tuscany (b. 1549)
- February 28 – Paul Sartorius, German composer (b. 1569)
- March – James Hamilton, 3rd Earl of Arran (b. c. 1537)
- March 9 – William Warner, English poet (b. c. 1558)
- March 17 – Olaus Martini, Swedish Archbishop of Uppsala (b. 1557)
- March 22 – Al-Jilani, Persian physician
- March 25
  - Isabelle de Limeuil, French noble (b. 1535)
  - John William, Duke of Jülich-Cleves-Berg (b. 1562)
- April 4 – Charles de L'Ecluse, Flemish botanist (b. 1526)
- April 6 – Merkelis Giedraitis, Lithuanian bishop (b. 1536)
- April 8 – Mark Kerr, 1st Earl of Lothian, Scottish statesman (b. 1553)
- April 9 – William Overton, English bishop (b. 1525)
- April 11 – John Lumley, 1st Baron Lumley, English Baron (b. 1533)
- April 14 – Gasparo da Salò (Gasparo Bertolotti), Italian violin maker(b. 1540)
- May 15 – Giovanni Croce, Italian composer (b. 1557)
- May 19
  - Jacob Lorhard, German philosopher (b. 1561)
  - García Hurtado de Mendoza, 5th Marquis of Cañete (b. 1535)
- June 15 – Yamada Arinobu, Japanese nobleman (b. 1544)
- July 15 – Annibale Carracci, Italian Baroque painter (b. 1560)
- July 20 – Federico Zuccari, Italian painter (b. 1543)
- August 4 – Cecily Bulstrode, English courtier (b. 1584)
- August 7 – Eustache Du Caurroy, French composer (b. 1549)
- August 6 – André du Laurens, French physician (b. 1558)
- August 28 – Francis Vere, English soldier (b. c. 1560)
- September 2 – Thomas Scrope, 10th Baron Scrope of Bolton, English general (b. 1567)
- September 3 – Jean Richardot, Belgian diplomat (b. 1540)
- September 17 – Maharal of Prague, Jewish mystic and philosopher (b. 1525)
- September 29 – Ebba Lilliehöök, Swedish countess (b. 1529)
- October 1 – Giammateo Asola, Italian composer (b. c. 1532)
- October 9 – John Leonardi, Italian founder of the Clerks Regular of the Mother of God of Lucca (b. 1541)
- October 16 – Dorothea Hedwig of Brunswick-Wolfenbüttel, Princess of Anhalt-Zerbst (b. 1587)
- October 19 – Jacobus Arminius, Dutch Reformed theologian (b. 1560)
- December – Barnabe Barnes, English poet (b. c. 1571)
- December 4 – Alexander Hume, Scottish poet (b. 1560)
- December 16 – Arild Huitfeldt, Danish historian (b. 1546)
