= 1606 =

1606 in various calendars
- Gregorian calendar: 1606; MDCVI
- Ab urbe condita: 2359
- Armenian calendar: 1055; ԹՎ ՌԾԵ
- Assyrian calendar: 6356
- Balinese saka calendar: 1527–1528
- Bengali calendar: 1012–1013
- Berber calendar: 2556
- English Regnal year: 3 Ja. 1 – 4 Ja. 1
- Buddhist calendar: 2150
- Burmese calendar: 968
- Byzantine calendar: 7114–7115
- Chinese calendar: 乙巳年 (Wood Snake); 4303 or 4096 — to — 丙午年 (Fire Horse); 4304 or 4097
- Coptic calendar: 1322–1323
- Discordian calendar: 2772
- Ethiopian calendar: 1598–1599
- Hebrew calendar: 5366–5367
- Hindu calendars
- Vikram Samvat: 1662–1663
- Shaka Samvat: 1527–1528
- Kali Yuga: 4706–4707
- Holocene calendar: 11606
- Igbo calendar: 606–607
- Iranian calendar: 984–985
- Islamic calendar: 1014–1015
- Japanese calendar: Keichō 11 (慶長１１年)
- Javanese calendar: 1526–1527
- Julian calendar: Gregorian minus 10 days
- Korean calendar: 3939
- Minguo calendar: 306 before ROC 民前306年
- Nanakshahi calendar: 138
- Thai solar calendar: 2148–2149
- Tibetan calendar: ཤིང་མོ་སྦྲུལ་ལོ་ (female Wood-Snake); 1732 or 1351 or 579 — to — མེ་ཕོ་རྟ་ལོ་ (male Fire-Horse); 1733 or 1352 or 580

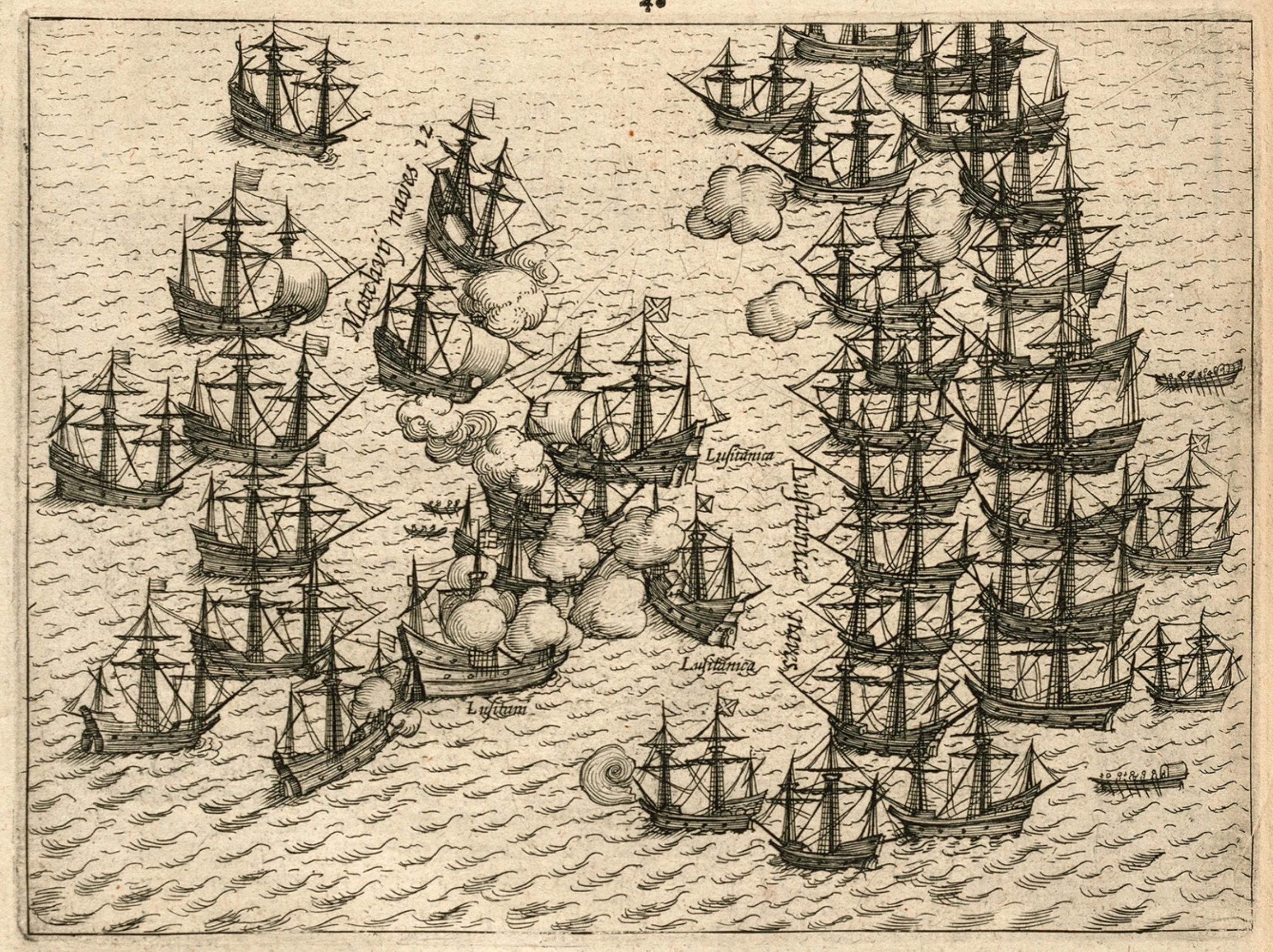
August 16: The Battle of Cape Rachado is fought between Portugal and the Dutch East India Company

1606 (MDCVI) was a common year starting on Sunday of the Gregorian calendar and a common year starting on Wednesday of the Julian calendar, the 1606th year of the Common Era (CE) and Anno Domini (AD) designations, the 606th year of the 2nd millennium, the 6th year of the 17th century, and the 7th year of the 1600s decade. As of the start of 1606, the Gregorian calendar was 10 days ahead of the Julian calendar, which remained in localized use until 1923.

== Events ==
=== January–March ===
- January 9 – The Black Nazarene, a statue, arrives in Manila from Mexico.
- January 24 – Gunpowder Plot: The trial of Guy Fawkes and other conspirators, for plotting against Parliament and James I of England, begins in London. They are hanged, drawn and quartered on January 30–31.
- January 29 – Explorer Pedro Fernandes de Queirós of Portugal, accompanied by a party of 160 men on the ships San Pedro, San Pablo and Los Tres Reyes, leads the first Europeans to discover the Pitcairn Islands.
- February 9 – Queirós and his crew discover Mehetia, followed three days later by the Tauere atoll.
- February 26 – Sailing on the Dutch ship Duyfken, Dutch navigator Willem Janszoon and the crew make the first confirmed sighting of Australia by a European, reaching the Cape York Peninsula, at the Pennefather River near what becomes Weipa, Queensland. The Duyfken follows by exploring the western coast.
- March 19 – Ferdinando I de' Medici, Grand Duke of Tuscany, in the Fortezza Vecchia Chapel of Saint Francesco, elevates Livorno to the rank of city.

=== April–June ===
- April 10 – Charter of 1606: The First Charter of Virginia is adopted, by which King James I of England grants rights to the Virginia Company (comprising the London Company and Plymouth Company) to settle parts of the east coast of North America.
- April 12 – The first version of the Union Flag is created, to be worn as a national flag by English and Scottish ships.
- April 17 – Venetian Interdict: Pope Paul V places the Republic of Venice under an interdict, as well as excommunicating Leonardo Donato, the Doge of Venice, and members of the Venetian Senate.
- May 1 – Pedro Fernandes de Queirós discovers the islands of Vanuatu (also known as the New Hebrides). Believing them to be Australia, he names them La Austrialia del Espiritu Santo.
- May 17 – Time of Troubles in Russia: The imposter Tsar Dmitry I is assassinated in the Kremlin by supporters of Vasili Shuisky.
- May 19 – Vasili Ivanovich Shuisky becomes the new Tsar of Russia as Vasili IV.
- June or October – Battle of Cape St. Vincent: An improvised Spanish fleet under Luis Fajardo defeats the Dutch fleet under Willem Haultain.
- June 21 – Derviş Mehmed Pasha is appointed the new Grand Vizier of the Ottoman Empire by Sultan Ahmed I after Sokolluzade Lala Mehmed Pasha dies of a stroke. Derviş Mehmed serves less than six months before Ahmed suddenly has him executed.
- June 22 – By Act of Parliament in England, all Roman Catholics in England become required to swear an oath of allegiance to King James I, a Protestant raised in the Presbyterian Church in Scotland.
- June 23 – A treaty is signed in Vienna between the Archduchy of Austria and the semi-independent Principality of Transylvania. Archduke Rudolf agrees to recognize Stephen Bocskai as Prince of Transylvania in return for Bocksay's guarantee of constitutional and religious rights to the ethnic Hungarians within Transylvania's borders.

=== July–September ===
- July 1 – Scottish minister Patrick Simson and 44 other ministers of the Church of Scotland sign Simson's Protest to the Scottish Parliament against the introduction to Scotland of a hierarchy of bishops.
- July 3 – The Russian Orthodox bishop Hermogenes is installed as the new Patriarch of Moscow and all Russia, replacing Ignatius.
- July 10
  - Simion Movilă becomes the new Prince of Moldavia upon the death of his older brother, Ieremia Movilă. Simion will reign for only 14 months before being poisoned on September 14, 1607.
  - England deports 47 Roman Catholic priests, including Thomas Garnet, putting them on board a ship bound for Flanders in modern-day Belgium. A royal proclamation is read to the group, warning them that they will be put to death if they ever return to the British Isles.
- July 14 – The expedition commanded by Portuguese explorer Luís Vaz de Torres, with the ships San Pedrico and Los Tres Reyes Magos, makes the first European sighting of South Pacific islands in New Guinea, starting with Rossel Island and Tagula Island. Discoveries follow on July 18 (Basilaki Island and Sideia Island), July 20 (the Dumoulin Islands and Sariba Island, and July 30 (Doini Island).
- July 24 – King Christian IV of Denmark, as the guest of his brother-in-law, King James of England, Scotland and Ireland, is welcomed at London, and the two monarchs are driven by coaches to a banquet at Theobalds House at Cheshunt, Hertfordshire. They are entertained by playwright Ben Jonson's play, The Entertainment of the Kings of Great Britain and Denmark.
- July 31 – Playwright John Marston presents his own original play to King James and King Christian during the Danish monarch's visit to London.
- August 16 – Battle of Cape Rachado: A Dutch fleet is defeated by the Portuguese.
- August (approx.) – Possible first performance of William Shakespeare's tragedy Macbeth in London.
- September 20 – The trial of alleged poisoners in the Frankenstein gravediggers scandal begins in the Bohemian town of Frankenstein.

=== October–December ===
- October 2 – King Charles IX of Sweden founds the city of Vaasa, in the parish of Korsholm in Coastal Ostrobothnia.
- October – Luís Vaz de Torres is the first European to sail through the Torres Strait.
- November 11 – The Peace of Zsitvatorok is signed between the Ottoman and Holy Roman Empires. The independence of Transylvania is recognized by both sides, and Austria's annual tribute to the Ottomans is abolished.
- December 19 – The Susan Constant sets out from the River Thames in England leading the Virginia Company's fleet for the foundation of Jamestown, Virginia.
- December 26 – William Shakespeare's play King Lear is given its first recorded performance, staged at the Palace of Whitehall.

== Births ==
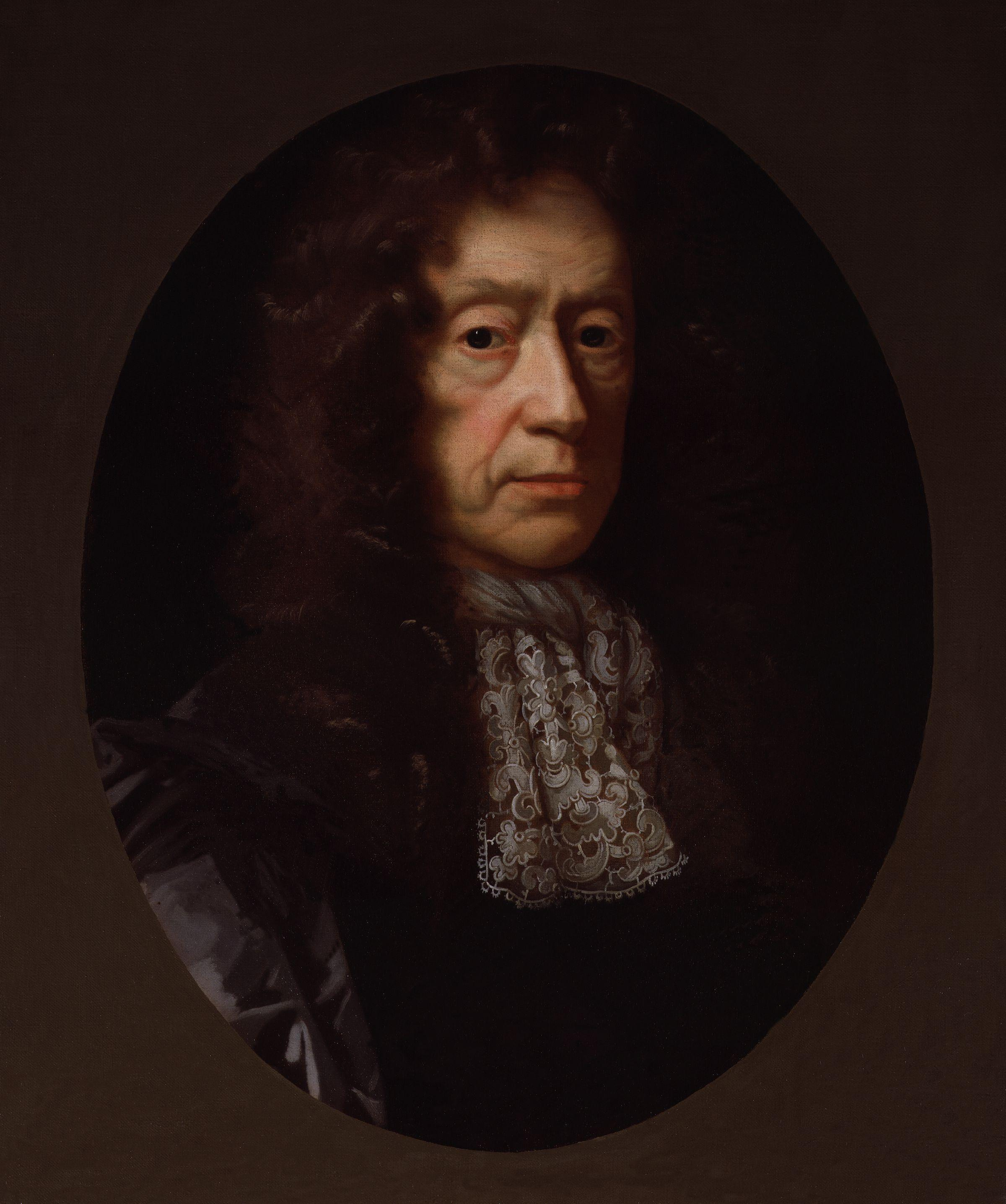
Edmund Waller

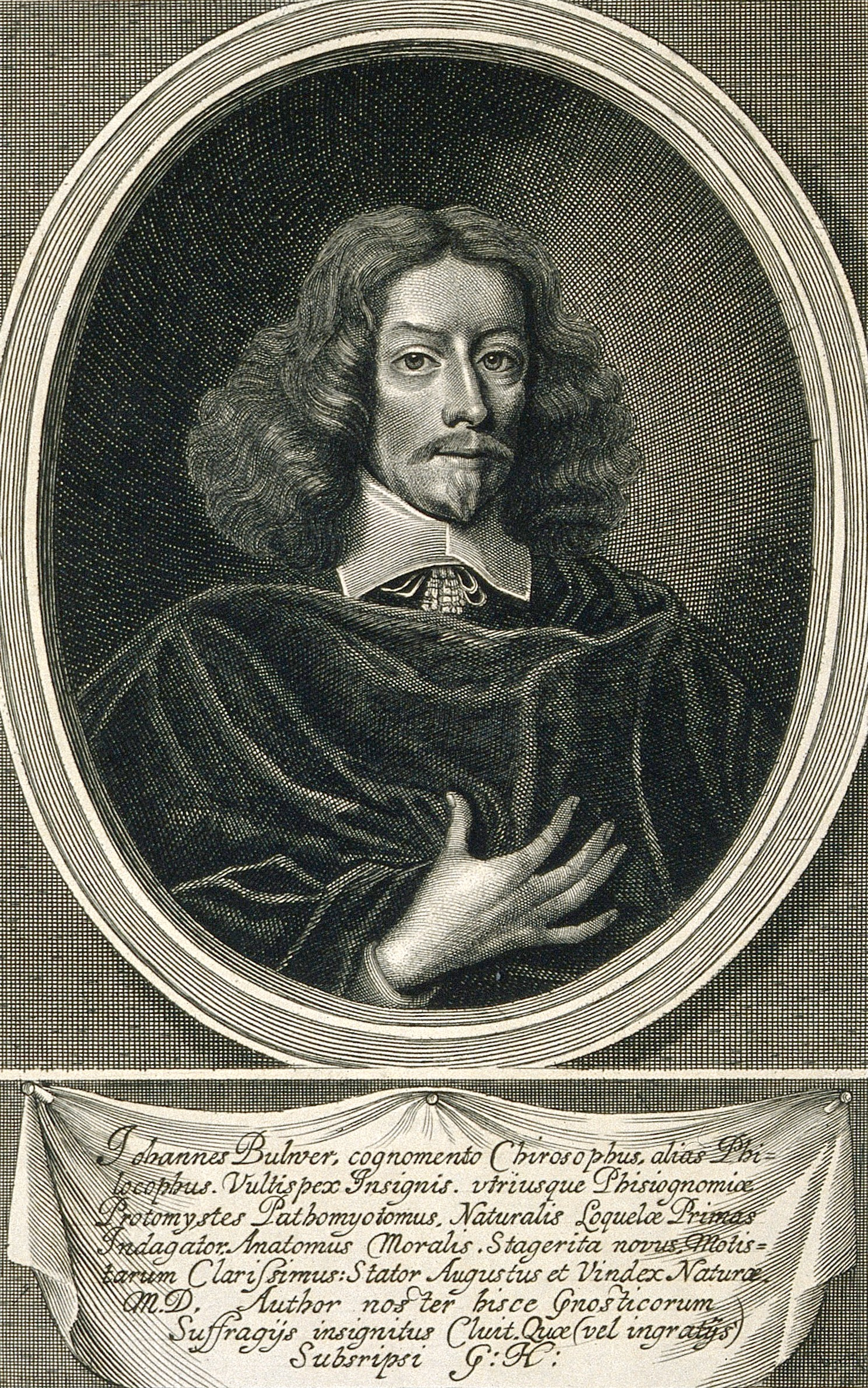
John Bulwer

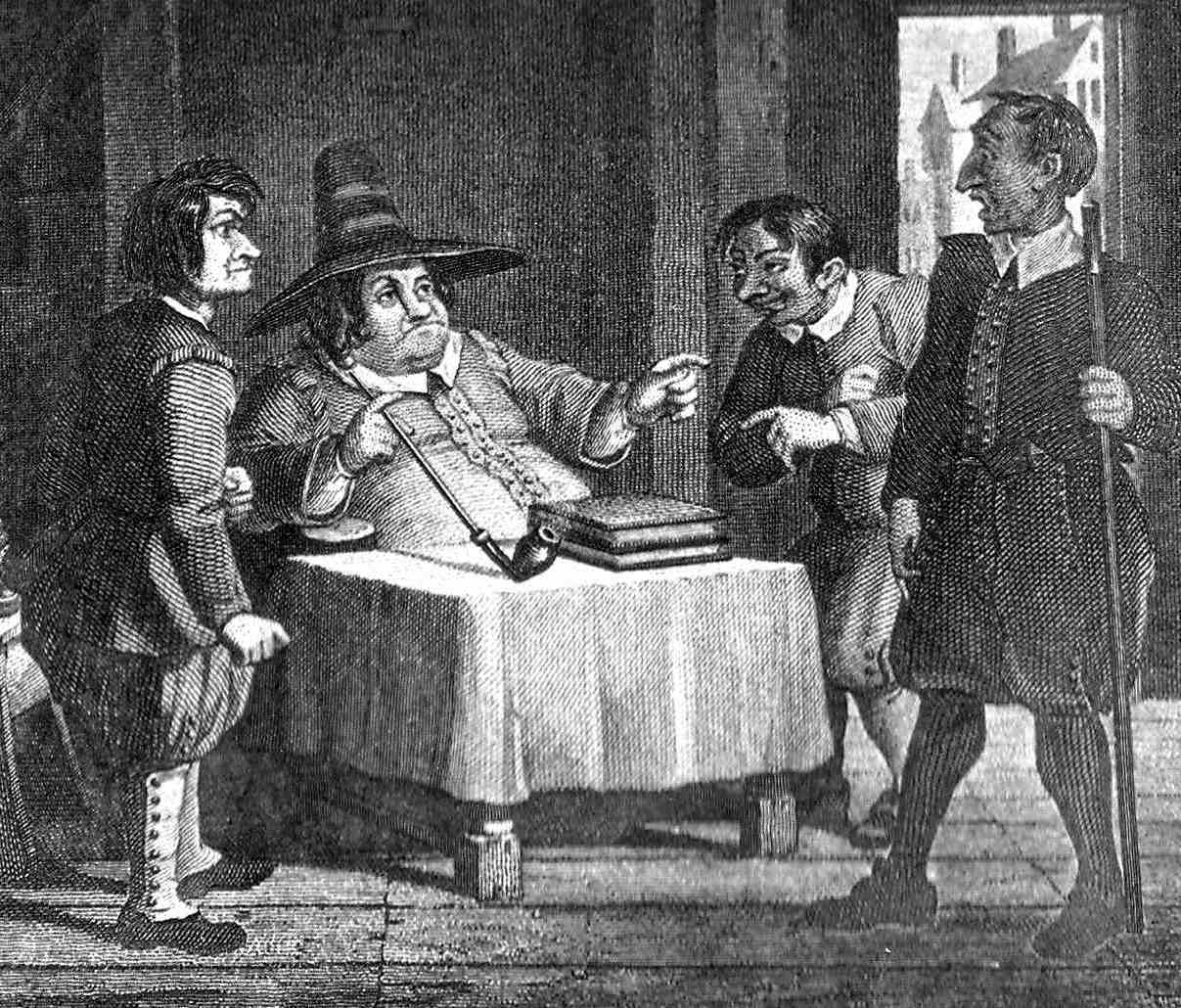
Wouter van Twiller

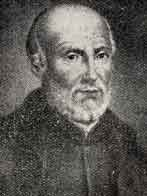
Julian Maunoir

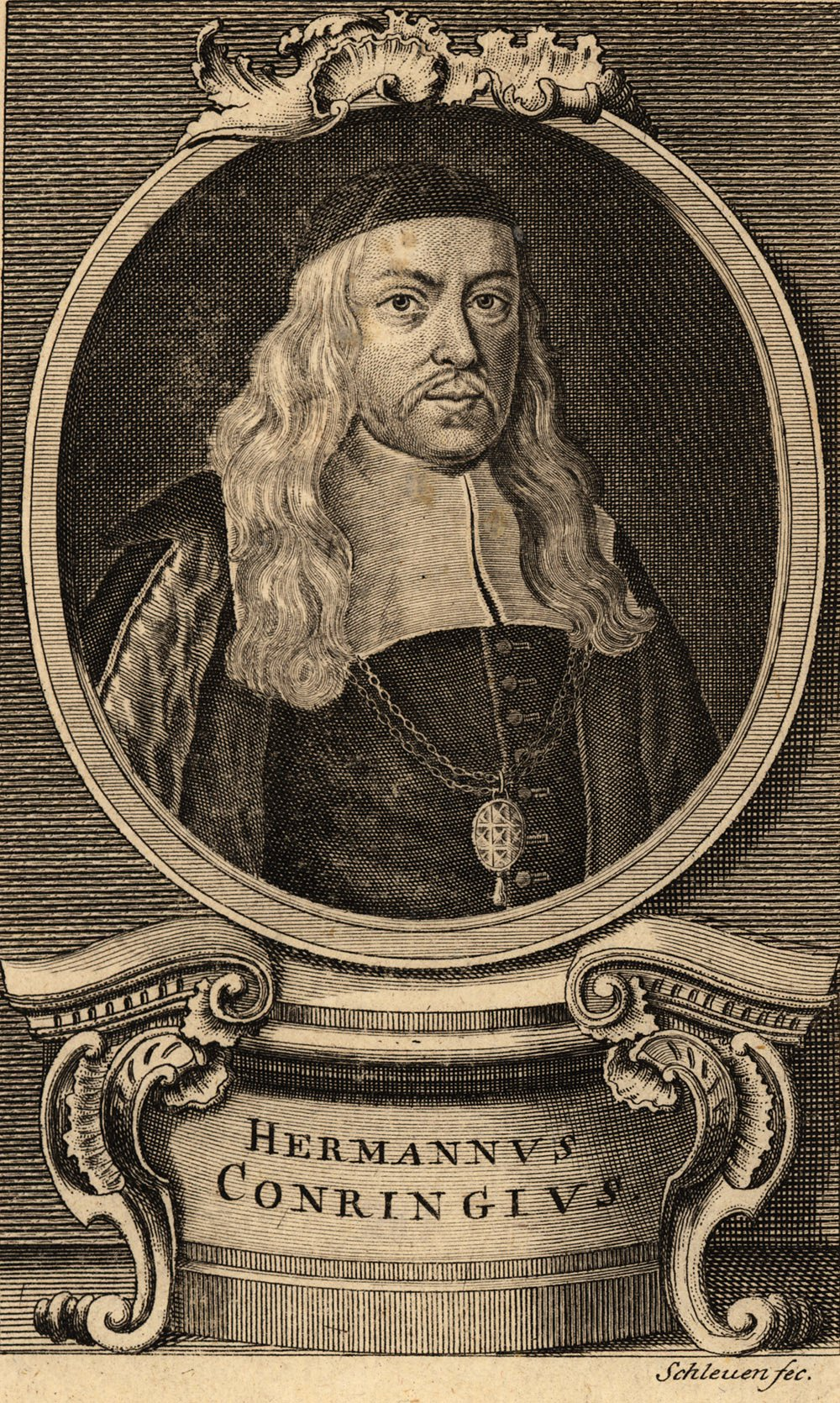
Hermann Conring

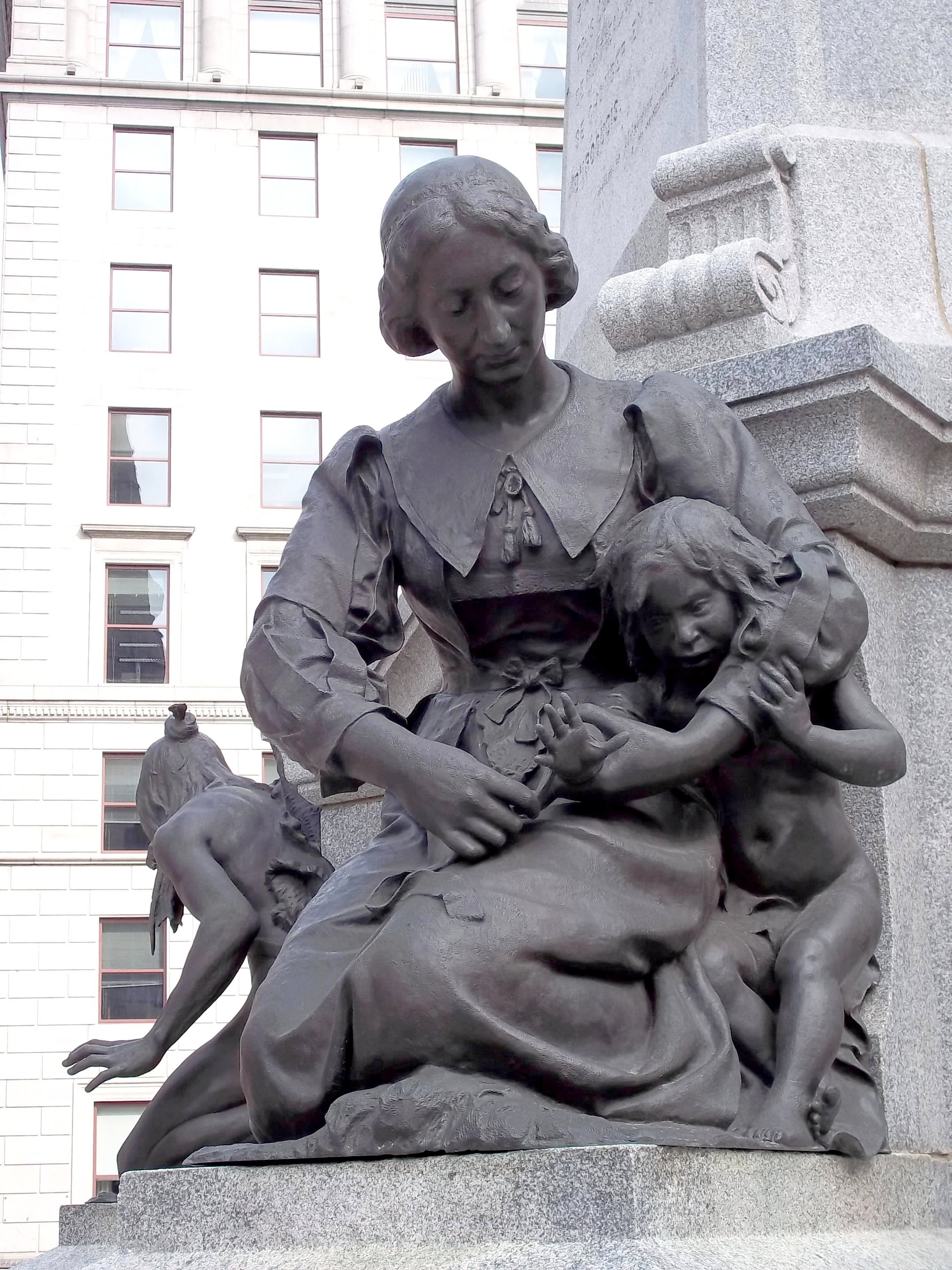
Jeanne Mance

=== January–March ===
- January 1 (bapt.) – Eva Ment, Dutch culture personality (d. 1652)
- January 4 (bapt.) – Edmund Castell, English orientalist (d. 1685)
- January 9 – William Dugard, English printer (d. 1662)
- January 11 – Judit Rumy, Hungarian noble (d. 1663)
- January 30 – Sir Orlando Bridgeman, 1st Baronet, of Great Lever (d. 1674)
- February 10 – Christine of France, Duchess of Savoy (d. 1663)
- February 12 – John Winthrop, the Younger, Governor of Connecticut (d. 1676)
- February 16 – William White, English politician (d. 1661)
- February 23
  - George Frederick of Nassau-Siegen, officer in the Dutch Army (d. 1674)
  - Richard Lloyd, English politician (d. 1676)
- February 27 – Laurent de La Hyre, French Baroque painter (d. 1656)
- c. February 28 – William Davenant, English poet and playwright (d. 1668)
- March – Henry Pierrepont, 1st Marquess of Dorchester (d. 1680)
- March 3 – Edmund Waller, English poet (d. 1687)
- March 18 – John X of Schleswig-Holstein-Gottorp, Prince-Bishop of Lübeck (1634–1655) (d. 1655)
- March 20 – Georg von Derfflinger, field marshal in the army of Brandenburg-Prussia (1618–1648) (d. 1695)
- March 25 – Gertrude More, English nun (d. 1633)
- March 27 – Hans Svane, Danish statesman (d. 1668)
- March 28 – Jacob Masen, German poet (d. 1681)
- March 30 – Vincentio Reinieri, Italian mathematician and astronomer (d. 1647)

=== April–June ===
- April 1 – Ernest Christopher, Count of Rietberg (1625–1640) (d. 1640)
- April 5 – Nicolas Perrot d'Ablancourt, Translator (d. 1664)
- April 6 – Amable de Bourzeys, French writer and academic (d. 1672)
- April 14 – Juliana of Hesse-Darmstadt, Countess of East Frisia (d. 1659)
- May 3
  - Marie de Bourbon, Countess of Soissons, wife of Thomas Francis (d. 1692)
  - Lorenzo Lippi, Italian painter and poet (d. 1665)
- May 6 – John Norton, American divine (d. 1663)
- May 12 – Joachim von Sandrart, German Baroque art-historian and painter (d. 1688)
- May 14 – Agnes of Hesse-Kassel, Princess consort of Anhalt-Dessau (d. 1650)
- May 16 (bapt.) – John Bulwer, British doctor (d. 1656)
- May 17 – Marco Faustini, Italian opera manager (d. 1676)
- May 22 – Wouter van Twiller, Director-General of New Netherland from 1633 until 1638 (d. 1654)
- May 23 – Juan Caramuel y Lobkowitz, Spanish writer (d. 1682)
- May 25 – Saint Charles Garnier, Jesuit missionary (d. 1649)
- June 3 – George Aribert of Anhalt-Dessau, German nobleman (d. 1643)
- June 6 – Pierre Corneille, French dramatist (d. 1684)
- June 16 – Arthur Chichester, 1st Earl of Donegall, Irish peer and soldier (d. 1675)
- June 19 – James Hamilton, 1st Duke of Hamilton, Scottish politician and noble (d. 1649)

=== July–September ===
Rembrandt

- July 8 – Jean Gamans, German hagiographer (d. 1684)
- July 10 – Corfitz Ulfeldt, Danish statesman (d. 1664)
- July 13 – Roland Fréart de Chambray, French architectural theorist (d. 1676)
- July 15 – Rembrandt (van Rijn), Dutch painter (d. 1669)
- July 20 – Hans Conrad Werdmüller, Swiss military commander (d. 1674)
- August 13 – Esteban de Aguilar y Zúñiga, Spanish writer (d. 1681)
- August 15 – Giovanna Maria Bonomo, beatified Italian Catholic nun (d. 1670)
- August 18 – Maria Anna of Spain (d. 1646)
- August 22 – Camille de Neufville de Villeroy, Archbishop of Lyon (d. 1693)
- September 1 – Nicholas Slanning, English politician (d. 1643)
- September 12 – John Spelman, English politician (d. 1663)
- September 18
  - Preben von Ahnen, German-born civil servant and landowner in Norway (d. 1675)
  - Zhang Xianzhong, Chinese rebel (d. 1647)
- September 22
  - Li Zicheng, Chinese rebel (d. 1645)
  - Richard Busby, English clergyman (d. 1695)
- September 28 – Sir William Drake, 1st Baronet, English politician (d. 1669)

=== October–December ===
- October 1 – Julian Maunoir, French Jesuit priest (d. 1683)
- October 12
  - Robert Barnham, English politician (d. 1685)
  - Christoph Bernhard von Galen, Westphalian Catholic prince-bishop of Münster and military leader (d. 1678)
- October 14 – Joan Maetsuycker, Governor-General of the Dutch East Indies from 1653 to 1678 (d. 1678)
- October 16 – Ottavio Amigoni, Italian painter (d. 1661)
- October 19 – Sir Gerrard Napier, 1st Baronet, English politician (d. 1673)
- October 20 – Francesco Maria Mancini, Italian Catholic cardinal (d. 1672)
- October 30 – Jean-Jacques Bouchard, French erotic writer (d. 1641)
- November 9 – Hermann Conring, German philosopher (d. 1681)
- November 12 – Jeanne Mance, French nurse and settler of New France (d. 1673)
- December 1 – Johann von Hoverbeck, Prussian diplomat (d. 1682)
- December 8 – Nicolò Sagredo, 105th Doge of Venice (d. 1676)
- December 11 – Thomas Nott, English Army officer (d. 1681)

=== Date unknown ===
- Leonard Calvert, Colonial governor of Maryland (d. 1647)
- Giovanni Francesco Grimaldi, Italian architect and painter (d. 1680)
- Thomas Herbert, English traveller and historian (d. 1682)
- John Robartes, 1st Earl of Radnor, English politician (d. 1685)
- Pierre du Ryer, French dramatist (d. 1658)
- Tokugawa Tadanaga, Japanese nobleman (d. 1633)
- Thomas Washbourne, English clergyman and poet (d. 1687)

== Deaths ==
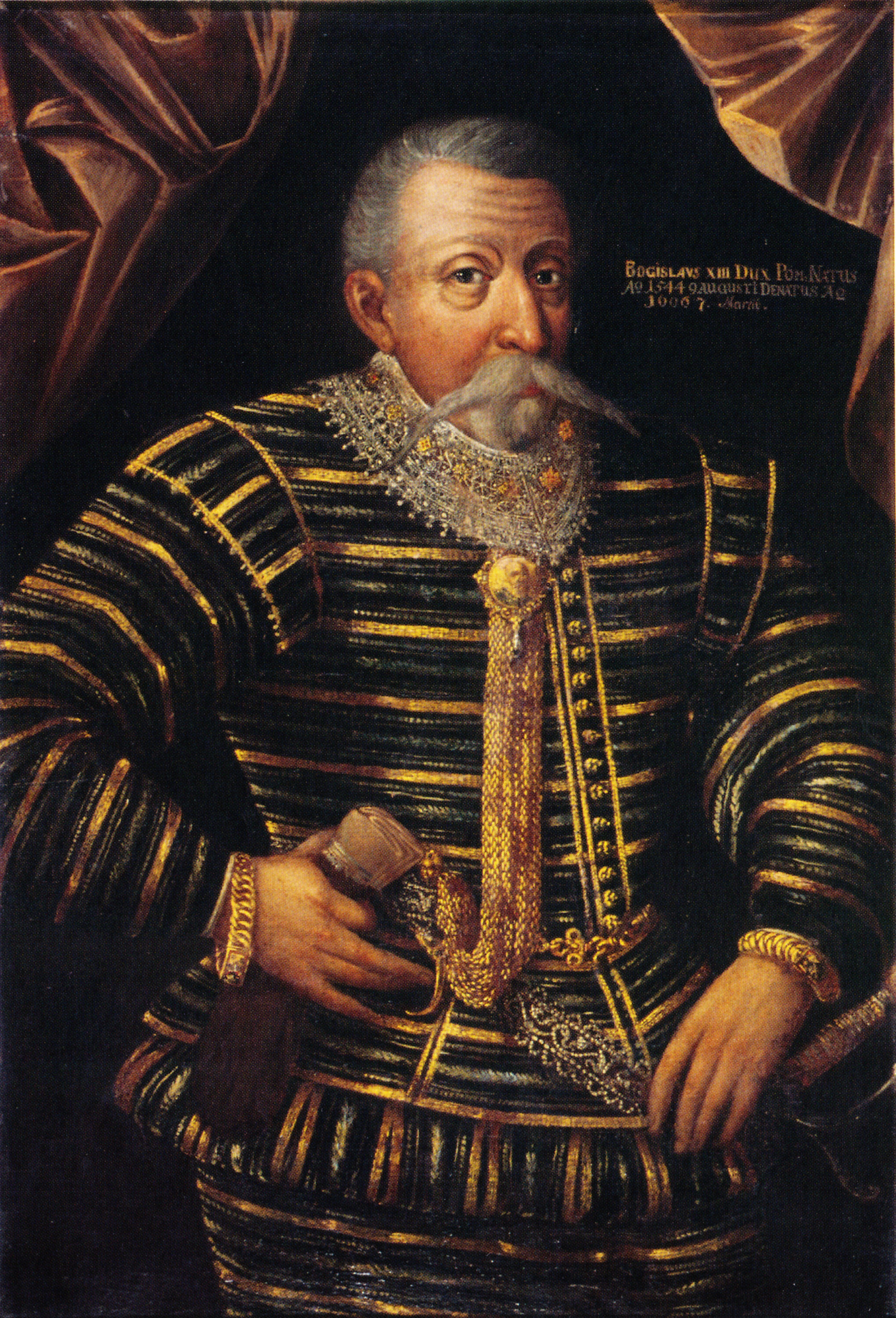
Bogislaw XIII, Duke of Pomerania

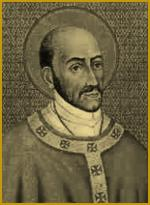
Turibius of Mogrovejo

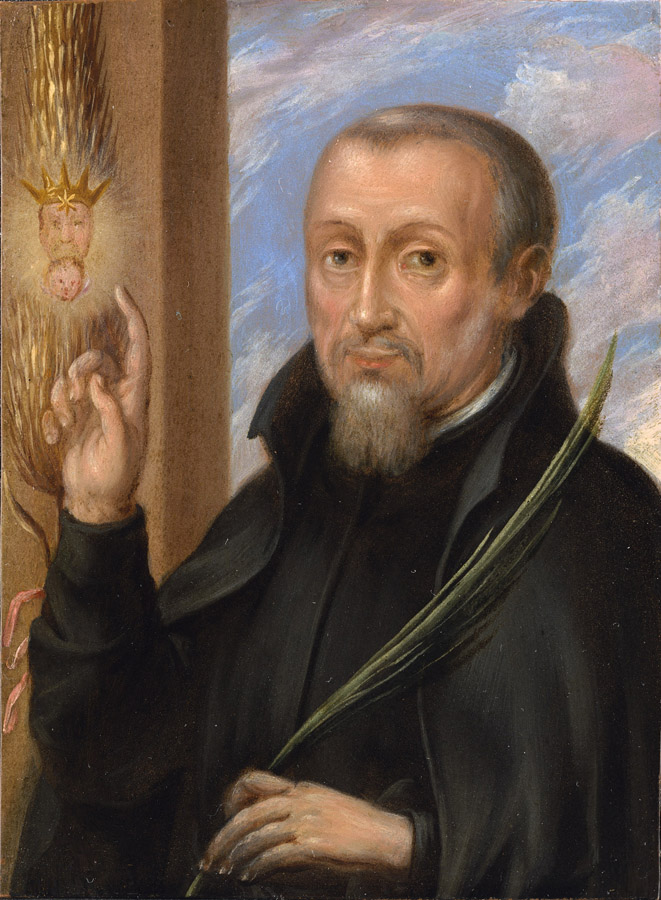
Henry Garnet

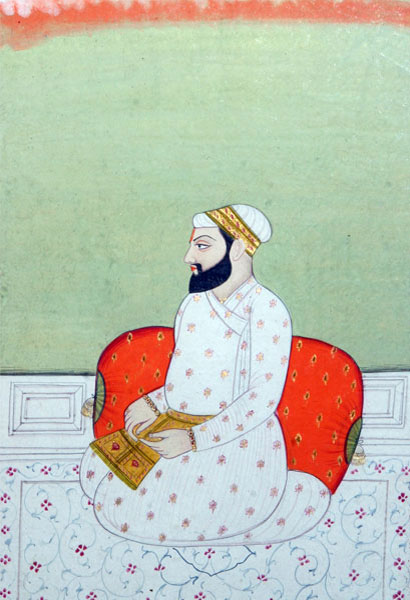
Guru Arjan

- January 4 – George Villiers, English knight (b. 1544)
- January 6 – Antonio Fernández de Córdoba y Cardona, Spanish diplomat (b. 1550)
- January 11 – Arnold III, Count of Bentheim-Steinfurt-Tecklenburg-Limburg, Lord of Rheda (b. 1554)
- January 20 – Sibylle Elisabeth of Württemberg, Duchess consort of Saxony (b. 1584)
- January 29 – Edward Tyrrell, English politician (b. 1551)
- January 30
  - Thomas Bates, English Catholic involved in 1605 Gunpowder Plot (executed) (b. 1567)
  - Everard Digby, English conspirator (executed) (b. 1578)
  - John Grant, Gunpowder plotter (b. 1570)
  - Robert Wintour, English conspirator (executed) (b. 1568)
- January 31
  - Guy Fawkes, English conspirator (executed) (b. 1570)
  - Robert Keyes, English criminal (b. 1565)
  - Ambrose Rokewood, English conspirator (executed)
  - Thomas Wintour, English conspirator (executed) (b. 1571)
- February 21 – Richard Field, English Jesuit (b. 1554)
- March 2 – Martin Moller, German poet and mystic (b. 1547)
- March 6 – Philip of Hohenlohe-Neuenstein, Dutch army commander (b. 1550)
- March 7 – Bogislaw XIII, Duke of Pomerania-Stettin from 1603 to 1606 (b. 1544)
- March 10 – Emperor Yaqob of Ethiopia (killed in battle)
- March 15 – Balthasar von Dernbach, Prince-Abbot of Fulda (b. 1548)
- March 16 – Gaspar de Zúñiga y Acevedo, Count of Monterrey, Spanish colonial administrator and Viceroy of Mexico (b. 1540)
- March 23
  - Justus Lipsius, Flemish humanist (b. 1547)
  - Turibius of Mogrovejo, Spanish missionary Archbishop of Lima (b. 1538)
  - Saint Turibius de Mongrovejo, Spanish Grand Inquisitioner and missionary Archbishop of Lima (b. 1538)
- March 25 – François de Bar, French scholar (b. 1538)
- April 3 – Charles Blount, 1st Earl of Devon, English politician (b. 1563)
- April 7 – Edward Oldcorne, English martyr (b. 1561)
- April 16 – John Addey, English shipwright (b. 1550)
- May 3 – Henry Garnet, English Jesuit (executed) (b. 1555)
- May 17
  - False Dmitriy I, pretender to the Russian throne (b. 1582)
  - Niccolò Orlandini, Italian Jesuit writer (b. 1554)
- May 22 – José de Sigüenza, Spanish theologian (b. 1544)
- May 30 – Guru Arjan Dev, fifth of the Sikh gurus (executed) (b. 1563)
- July 7 – Christopher, Duke of Brunswick-Harburg, co-ruler of Brunswick-Lüneburg-Harburg (1603–1606) (b. 1570)
- July 28 – Antonio de Raya Navarrete, Spanish Catholic prelate who served as Bishop of Cuzco (1594–1606) (b. 1536)
- September 2 – Karel van Mander, Dutch painter and poet (b. 1548)
- September 3 – Juan de Borja y Castro, Spanish noble (b. 1533)
- September 9 – Leonhard Lechner, German composer and music editor (b. 1553)
- September 28 – Nicolaus Taurellus, German philosopher and theologian (b. 1547)
- October 5 – Philippe Desportes, French poet (b. 1546)
- October 8 – Johann VI of Nassau-Dillenburg (b. 1536)
- November 8 – Girolamo Mercuriale, Italian philologist and physician (b. 1530)
- November 16 – Alderano Cybo-Malaspina, Italian nobleman (b. 1552)
- November 20 – (burial date) John Lyly, English writer (b. 1553)
- December 29 – Stephen Bocskay, Prince of Transylvania (b. 1557)
- Date unknown – Akaza Naoyasu, Japanese nobleman
