= John Addey =

John Addey is the name of:

- John Addey (astrologer) (1920–1982), English astrologer
- John Addey (shipbuilder) (1550–1606), master shipwright

== See also ==
- Addey (surname)
