= Addey =

Addey is a surname. Notable people with the surname include:

- John Addey (shipbuilder) (1550–1606), English shipwright
- John Addey (astrologer) (1920–1982), English astrologer

== See also ==
- Addey and Stanhope School, Deptford, London, England - named for the shipbuilder
- Addy (disambiguation)
- Addie (disambiguation)
