= Addie (disambiguation) =

Addie is a unisex given name, a nickname and a surname. It may also refer to:

- Addie, North Carolina, an unincorporated community
- Addie Township, Griggs County, North Dakota
- Lake Addie, Minnesota
- ADDIE Model, a framework that lists generic processes that instructional designers and training developers use

== See also ==
- USS Addie and Carrie (ID 3226), a wooden barge used by the US Navy from 1918 to 1919
- Addy (disambiguation)
- Addey (disambiguation)
