= Addey and Stanhope School =

Coordinates: 51.4749°N 0.0277°W

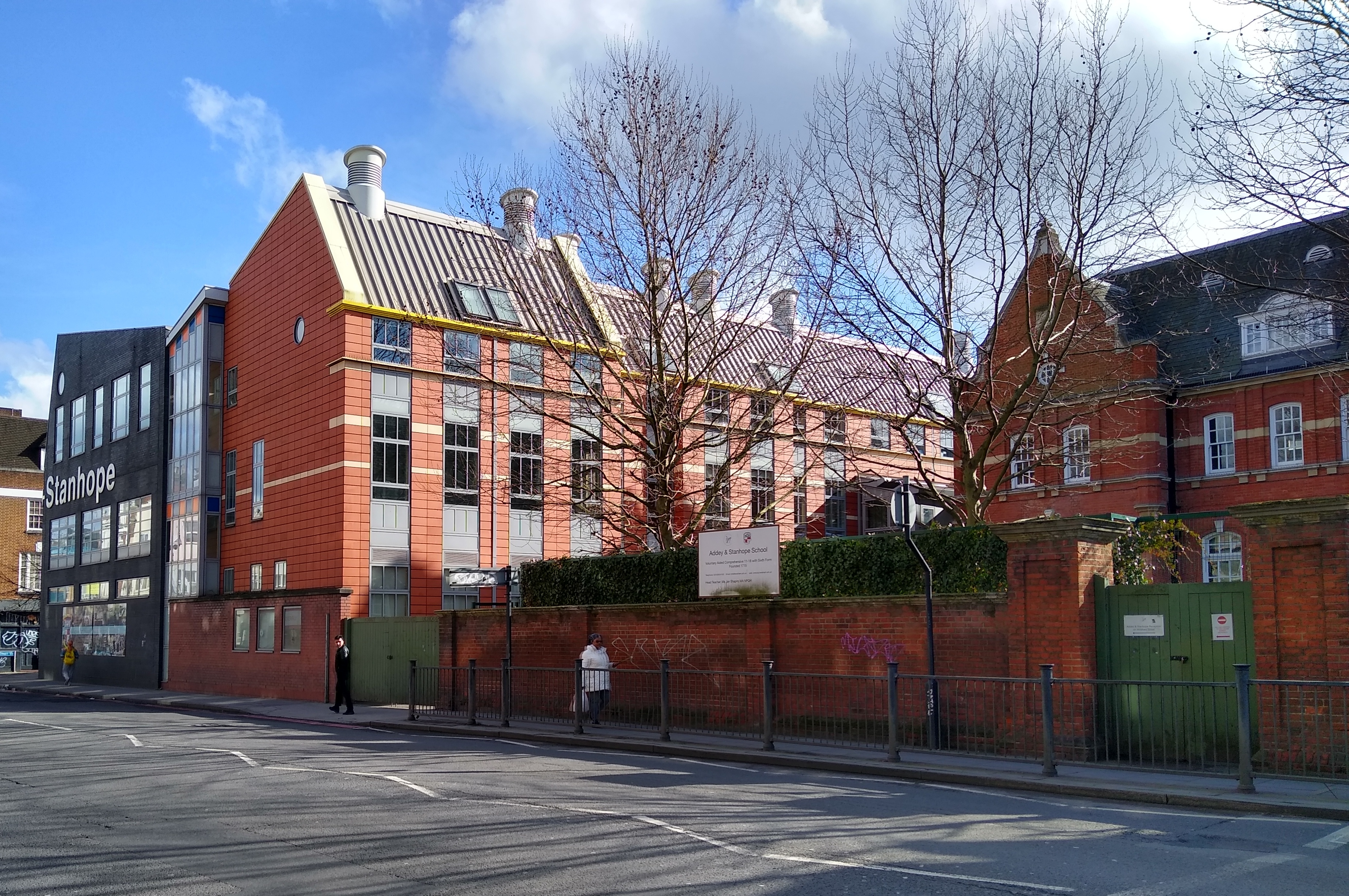
- London,, SE14 6TJ, England

Information
- Type: Voluntary aided school
- Motto: A Deo et Rege ("From God and the King")
- Established: 1606; 420 years ago (Addey); 1660 (Stanhope); 1894 (merger)
- Founder: John Addey and George Stanhope
- Local authority: Lewisham
- Department for Education URN: 100748 Tables
- Ofsted: Reports
- Chairman of Governors: Paul Trynka
- Headmistress: David Murrells
- Staff: ~100
- Gender: Coeducational
- Age: 11 to 16
- Enrolment: 596 (2011)
- Houses: Addey; Stanhope; Pepys; Evelyn
Colour
- Former pupils: Old Addeyans
- Website: as.lewisham.sch.uk

Addey and Stanhope School is a voluntary-aided, co-educational secondary school, located in Lewisham, London, England. It is a former grammar school with origins dating to 1606. The interim headmaster is currently David Murrells.

== History ==
=== The Addey School ===
The School's origins date to 1606 when John Addey (1550–1606), Master shipwright at Deptford Dockyard, having made his fortune in shipbuilding, left £200 to help the poor of Deptford; this money was then invested in land and the rent from that land was to be given away as charity. This amounted to 40 shillings each, per annum given to 100 parishioners of Deptford. However, in 1820 the trustees felt that this type of poor relief encouraged fecklessness and instead decided to found the Addey School in 1821 on Church Street, Deptford. 'A Topographical Dictionary of England' (1848) it is explained that the Addey School "by direction of the court of chancery, erected a spacious building containing two large schoolrooms, with houses for the master and mistress; the school is wholly supported by the endowment, from which also 48 aged persons are paid £2 each annually.". Later in 1862 the School was enlarged. To commemorate Addey's charity and the help given to the poor of Deptford, a plaque was erected in St Nicholas Church, Deptford in 1862, following is quoted the inscription on the tablet:

John Addey commemoration plaque

The above named John Addey by his will gave to his executor two hundred pounds to procure a perpetual annuity towards the relief of the poor people of Deptford to last forever. Therewith was purchased a piece of ground on the east side of Church street in this town, the rents and profits arising therefrom and from the buildings thereon exceed on this present year 1862 six hundred and fifty pounds from this fund forty shillings was are annually given to one hundred poor parishioners of Deptford, and large schools for poor children of the town are maintained. This tablet was erected by trustees of the charity to commemorate this good deed of a good man.

- 1990-A new Headmaster, Mr Barret.
- 1995-A new music block was opened.
- 1996-A new Headmaster, Mr Whyte.
- 1999-A new Design and Technology block was opened. The Basil Howard Library was opened.
- 2001-Mr Lawrence retired after 49 years with the school.
- 2003-A new Head teacher, Ms Potter.
- 2005-The School gained Technology College Status.
- 2012-Under the Building Schools for the Future programme:

New administration offices, Dining hall, Learning Resource Centre and sports hall opened.

- 2015– A new Head Teacher, Jan Shapiro.

=== The Stanhope School ===
Stanhope School in the 18th century

The School's second founder Dean George Stanhope (1660–1728) the vicar of St Nicholas, Deptford, and St Mary's, Lewisham, and who later rose to be Dean of Canterbury, and friend of Jonathan Swift, founded the Stanhope School in 1715. Dr Stanhope had previously given £150 for the establishment of a girls school in Lewisham in 1699. Originally the school educated fifty deprived children of Deptford, twenty five girls and twenty five boys, in purely practical skills such as needlework and carpentry. According to the National Archives, the school was enlarged in 1812, and in 1874, with the charity changing its name to the Stanhope Foundation. Two statues of a girl and a boy pupil once adorned the front of the Stanhope School, the statue of the girl now resides in the entrance to the main Addey and Stanhope school building. The Stanhope School was financed partly out of the sale of sermons, donations and public subscriptions. Each subscriber was entitled to put one child into the school. Additionally, several benefactions were left in the wills of a number of Deptford residents who made provision for the local poor. The School, as it was a charity school was often known as the Bluecoat School, Daniel Lysons (1796) explains Dr Stanhope's biography:

The learned and pious Dr. Stanhope, who was presented to this vicarage by Lord Dartmouth in 1689, was a native of Hertishorn in Derbyshire. He received his education at Eton and at King's College in Cambridge. In 1697 he commenced D. D. and in 1703 was promoted to the deanery of Canterbury. His writings are held in great esteem, particularly his Comments upon the Epistles and Gospels. His printed sermons are very numerous; they were much admired when delivered by himself from the pulpit, the purity of their diction being graced with the most happy elocution. Dr. Stanhope died in 1728, and was buried at Lewisham. His monument, the inscription on which has been already given, deserved a better fate than to be thrown aside in the vault, where it now lies, when the church was rebuilt. A place should have been found within the new walls for the memorial of a man who was for thirty-eight years so distinguished an ornament of the parish.

The Stanhope School also published rules for both parents and pupils to follow while attending the School: 1 January 1814

Rules for the Guidance of Parents, Relations, & Friends

They are to send their children regularly to School, clean, washed and combed, a quarter before nine in the morning, and a quarter before two in the afternoon, precisely. On Sundays, they are to send them before they proceed to Church, a quarter before ten in the morning, and a quarter before two in the afternoon, precisely. They are not to detain them from School, or Church, except from sickness, or with leave. – In case of sickness, immediate information must be given. They are not to take their children from the School without one month's previous notice. The cloaths, &c. are to be immediately returned on the removal or dismissal of any child: security to that effect must be given by parents, relations, or friends. They are not to interfere with the discipline of the school. Parents, relations, and friends, are expected to instill into their children the principles of gratitude, obedience, and submission. N.B. No child having an unseemly appearance, a cutaneous eruption, or infectious disorder, will be admitted into the School.

Rules to be observed by the Children

They must go directly to and from the School in an orderly manner. They must take the greatest care of their cloaths, caps, books, &c. and never appear in the Streets dirty or ragged. They must pay every proper and due respect to their Benefactors, Elders, and Superiors, whether passing them, or meeting them in the Streets. They are never allowed to appear in the Streets but in the uniform dress allowed them by the Trustees. The Boys are to be on the Muster Ground, precisely at the times appointed, otherwise they will lose their call.

Children are not to take God's Name in Vain; to swear, to lie, to steal, to cheat, to play truant, or to throw stones. For misbehaviour at Church, they will invariably be punished.

Stanhope School in the 19th century

=== The Schools Amalgamate ===
The Education Act 1870 took the responsibility for elementary education out of private hands and into local authority control; as a result the governors of the Stanhope School decided to close the school and use the money to send children to other schools in the local area. By 1891 the governors of the Addey School also felt that their School was no longer useful, the two schools eventually merging in 1894 to found the Addey and Stanhope School for Art and Science. Sir Alfred Brumwell Thomas, a leading architect in the High Edwardian Baroque style, designed the main school building, a dignified L-shaped red-brick building with prominent gables and a grand doorcase, it was completed in 1899. Along with the statue of the schoolgirl, a tablet to John Addey was erected in 1906 in the entrance hall to commemorate the tricentenary of his death.

=== 20th century ===
Addey and Stanhope was a grammar school from 1944 until 1977 and was one of the first co-educational secondary schools in England. After the merger, Mr Salter became the headmaster in 1896, remaining head for 28 years. During this time, the present school building was opened in 1900, the south wing being added in 1933. Basil Alvin Howard became headmaster in 1924, encouraging co-education, beginning foreign School trips and was the author of two books "The Mixed School" and "The Proper Study of Man" before retiring in 1956 . In 1991 the Basil Howard Research Studentship was established for Sidney Sussex College, Cambridge, at the bequest of Basil Howard, who had graduated from Sidney Sussex College in 1913. The Studentship is designed for those wishing to study a Ph.D in any subject at Cambridge. Due to the threat of bombing, the School was evacuated in 1939 to a mansion in Burwash Common, East Sussex. However, as World War II progressed the School moved again to Garnant, South Wales for the duration of the War. On the afternoon of 25 November 1944, New Cross Gate suffered the single most devastating V-2 rocket attack on a civilian population in the entire war. The rocket landed on a very busy Woolworths on New Cross Road killing 168 people and wounding 121; among the dead were two Addey and Stanhope school pupils, Ronald James Kenwood and Norman Henry Wilkins, both aged 11. Two more pupils were killed during the war, Stanley Fox aged 12 and Henry Jack Foweather aged 19, both killed at their homes in air raids.

Towards the end of the twentieth century the school gained new buildings and teaching facilities in an effort to provide better learning conditions for pupils and provide space for a larger intake of children. A new Design & Technology, Art and Music building was built in 1997; while a new wing to the main building of the school was built with classrooms for French and mathematics, a large gym and changing rooms, and ICT rooms.

=== 21st century ===
In 2003, The Duke of York visited the school to open the new wing containing larger computer rooms, a new gym and rooms for maths and languages. The Duke toured the whole school, speaking with the pupils before meeting the teachers and school governors. The school became a specialist science and technology school in 2006, adding emphasis on the use of computers, science and maths; the school also receives extra funding and support for its new speciality. Joan Ruddock, Member of Parliament for the local constituency said:

I would like to take this opportunity to congratulate all staff and students at Addey and Stanhope School on obtaining specialist technology status. It is a wonderful achievement and will open up many opportunities in the important field of technology. I am proud of the commitment Addey and Stanhope School is showing to raising standards in education...across the borough.

Under the Building Schools for the Future programme, an older building from the 1970s was demolished and a new one constructed in 2012. The new building provides new dining and kitchen facilities and a larger school library, and a larger area for sports.

== Overview ==
A small school, Addey and Stanhope attempts to use its lack of size to develop an atmosphere of intimacy and inclusiveness for its pupils. Addeys is a non-denominational school, however, the school has a strong moral ethos, which values and celebrates its students cultural and religious richness, and has a strong connection with the Church of England and especially St. Paul's, Deptford.

=== Houses ===
The school is divided into four houses; two are named after the founders, Addey House, and Stanhope House, the other two are named after historical figures with local connections, Pepys House after Samuel Pepys, Evelyn House after John Evelyn. Pepys was a 17th-century diarist who often visited the Royal Dockyards at Deptford as Clerk to the Navy Board, and John Evelyn, another celebrated 17th-century diarist and writer, who settled in Sayes Court, Deptford. Each year the four houses compete for the House Sports Cup and the House of the Year Cup which is won by the house with the largest accumulation of merits by the students in that house.

House Name	House Colour	Named After
Addey		John Addey
Stanhope		George Stanhope
Pepys		Samuel Pepys
Evelyn		John Evelyn

=== Founders' Day ===
Founders' Day, held on the first Thursday in March of every year, is celebrated by the School and allows many past and present staff, parents and students to congregate to celebrate the founding of the school, a tradition observed since 1907. A service is held in St Alfege's Church, Greenwich, where the congregation receives readings, performances, sings hymns and the Addey and Stanhope School Song. Afterwards a celebration is held in the School hall for former students and staff. The School also has its own prayer dedicated to the founders:

We thank Thee, O Lord for the love and imagination of John Addey and George Stanhope, and for the generosity of all unknown people who hath helped found this school. And we thank thee for the labours of those who hath carefully husbanded our resources and used them to our advantage. We give thanks also for all those teachers, parents and pupils who have given generously of their spiritual, mental and physical resources and hath handed to us the life and tradition of the school, for our safekeeping. For these and all Thy mercies we thank Thee, O Lord and vouchsafe we beseech thee to forgive us of all those past occasions when our deeds and thoughts make us unworthy of our inheritance. Through Jesus Christ our Lord. Amen.

== Old Addeyans ==
- Adam Afriyie MP, b. 1965
- Errol Fuller, b. 1947, writer and painter
- Revd Dennis Hawker (1946–2003), former Bishop of Grantham
- Dorothy Lightbourne, Attorney General of Jamaica 2007–2011
- Eddie Prevost b.1942, Musician
- Geoffrey Roberts b.1952, British historian
- Sir Denis Rooke (1924–2008), Chancellor of Loughborough University and former Chairman of British Gas
- Lowri Turner, b. 1964, TV presenter
- Tessa Wheeler, (1893–1936), archaeologist
- Shaunagh Brown, b. 1990, rugby union player

== See also ==
- John Addey (shipbuilder)
- George Stanhope
- Deptford
- Samuel Pepys
- John Evelyn
- St. Paul's Church
- St Alfege's Church
