= Addy =

Addy may refer to:

- Addy (surname)
- Addy Pross (born 1945), Israeli chemistry professor and author
- Addy, Washington, United States, an unincorporated community
- Addy Awards, advertising competition
- Addy Walker, a doll from the American Girl series
- Addy, American slang for Adderall
- Addy, slang for email address

== See also ==
- Addey (disambiguation), a surname
- Addie (disambiguation)
