= Listed buildings in Hartshorne, Derbyshire =

Hartshorne is a civil parish in the South Derbyshire district of Derbyshire, England. The parish contains eleven listed buildings that are recorded in the National Heritage List for England. Of these, one is listed at Grade II*, the middle of the three grades, and the others are at Grade II, the lowest grade. The parish contains the village of Hartshorne and the surrounding countryside. The listed buildings consist of houses, farmhouses and farm buildings, a church, a public house, and a former toll house.

== Key ==
Grade	Criteria
II*	Particularly important buildings of more than special interest
II	Buildings of national importance and special interest

== Buildings ==
Name and location	Photograph	Date	Notes	Grade
St Peter's Church; 52.78411°N 1.51618°W		15th century	The oldest part of the church is the tower, the nave dates from 1835, and the north aisle and chancel were added in 1903 by G. F. Bodley. The church is built in sandstone with tile roofs, and consists of a nave with a west porch, a north aisle, a chancel with a south vestry, and a northwest tower. The tower has three stages with a string course, buttresses, a west doorway with a four-centred arch, above which is a row of carvings, including shields and animals. In the upper stages are clock faces, two-light bell openings, gargoyles, and an embattled parapet.	II
The Manor House; 52.78351°N 1.51672°W		1618–22	The house, later divided, is timber framed on a sandstone plinth and has a tile roof. There are two storeys and a cellar, the upper storey is jettied, it has a T-shaped plan consisting of a hall range and a cross-wing. The timber framing is close studded in the ground floor and with herringbone framing above. On the east front is a mullioned and transomed bracketed oriel window and gabled dormer, and elsewhere are casement and horizontally-sliding sash windows. Inside the house there are inglenook fireplaces.	II*
Short Hazels Farmhouse; 52.77556°N 1.51106°W	—	17th century	The farmhouse was extended in the 19th century, and has a tile roof with moulded gable copings and plain kneelers to the south. There are two storeys and a T-shaped plan. The original part is the south wing, which is in sandstone on a chamfered plinth, and contains a doorway with a chamfered surround. The windows are a mix, and include a single-light window, a blocked mullioned and transomed window, a segmental-headed casement window, and windows with four-centred arched heads. The later part is in red brick, and contains windows with segmental-arched heads.	II
Spring Farmhouse and barn 52.79070°N 1.52350°W	—	17th century (probable)	The farmhouse and attached barn are in rendered brick with a timber framed core, and tile roofs. There are two storeys, and the farmhouse has three bays. The doorway has a segmental head, and the windows are casements. The barn to the left has two doorways, one with a segmental head and the other with a flat head.	II
Manor Farmhouse; 52.78566°N 1.51482°W	—	1677	The farmhouse is in sandstone and rendered brick on a chamfered plinth, with floor bands, a dentilled eaves cornice, and a roof of Welsh slate and tile. There are two storeys and attics, a T-shaped plan, a front of three bays with a central pedimented gable, and a rear wing. The central doorway has pilasters, a traceried rectangular fanlight, and a hood mould. The windows on the front are casements with segmental heads. The rear wing contains a canted bay window and a re-set datestone.	II
4–6 Manchester Lane; 52.78284°N 1.51643°W	—	18th century (probable)	A pair of red brick houses on a stepped plinth with a dentilled eaves cornice and a tile roof. There are two storeys and four bays, the left bay lower and slightly recessed. Steps with railings lead up to the doorway that has a blocked fanlight and a bracketed hood. Most of the windows are three-light casements with segmental heads, and in the upper floor of the left bay is a smaller window.	II
Brook House Farmhouse; 52.79044°N 1.52444°W		Mid 18th century	A red brick house with a dentilled eaves cornice and a tile roof with coped gables and plain kneelers. There are three storeys and a symmetrical front of three bays. Steps lead up to the doorway that has a traceried rectangular fanlight, and the windows are sashes; all the openings have wedge lintels.	II
Mill House; 52.78856°N 1.51912°W	—	Mid 18th century	The house is in red brick with a dentilled eaves cornice, and a tile roof with coped gables and plain kneelers. There are two storeys and three bays. The central doorway has a gabled hood, and is flanked by cross windows with segmental heads. In the upper floor is a blind panel flanked by casement windows.	II
1 Church Street; 52.78411°N 1.51671°W	—	Early 19th century	The house is in red brick with a tile roof, and has two storeys and a symmetrical front of three bays. The central doorway and the flanking tripartite casement windows are each recessed in a segmental arch with shallow Gothic arches in the tympana. In the upper floor are three two-light casement windows with pointed lights under segmental arches.	II
The Bull's Head; 52.78301°N 1.51672°W		Early 19th century	The public house is in red brick on a rendered plinth, with a dentilled eaves cornice, and a tile roof with coped gables and plain kneelers. There are two storeys and attics, and a front of three bays. The central doorway has a rectangular fanlight and a bracketed hood. The windows are sashes with wedge lintels, and in the west gable end is a staircase window with a segmental head.	II
Toll House; 52.76752°N 1.50415°W		Early 19th century	The toll house, later a private house, is in painted brick with a hipped tile roof. There are two storeys and a canted corner containing a doorway with a chamfered surround. The windows are casements in chamfered surrounds, and in the upper floor is a recessed panel.	II
