= Jean-Jacques Bouchard =

French writer (1606–1641)

Jean-Jacques Bouchard (30 October 1606, in Paris – 26 August 1641, in Rome) was a French writer. He was the son of Jean Bouchard, Secretary of the King, and Claude Merceron, a relation of Gilles Ménage, from a recently ennobled family composed of judges. Bouchard was an author of erotic literature and notably published Confessions.

== Main works ==
- La Conjuration du comte de Fiesque, traduite de l'italien du Sgr Mascardi par le Sr de Fontenay Sainte-Geneviève et dédiée à Monseigneur l'Éminentissime Cardinal Duc de Richelieu, Paris, 1639
- Journal I Les confessions; Voyage de Paris à Rome; Le carnaval à Rome, works by Jean-Jacques Bouchard, by Emanuele Kanceff, Turin, Giappichelli, 1976
- Journal II Voyage dans le royaume de Naples; Voyage dans la campagne de Rome, works by Jean-Jacques Bouchard, by Emanuele Kanceff, Turin, Giappichelli, 1977
- Confessions, preceded by "Avez-vous lu Bouchard ?" by Patrick Mauriès, Paris, le Promeneur, 2003 (ISBN 2-07-076869-4)

== Bibliography ==
- René Pintard, Le Libertinage érudit dans la première moitié du XVIIe siècle, Paris, Boivin, 1943, Slatkine reed., 2000
