= John Bulwer =

English physician and philosopher (1606–1656)

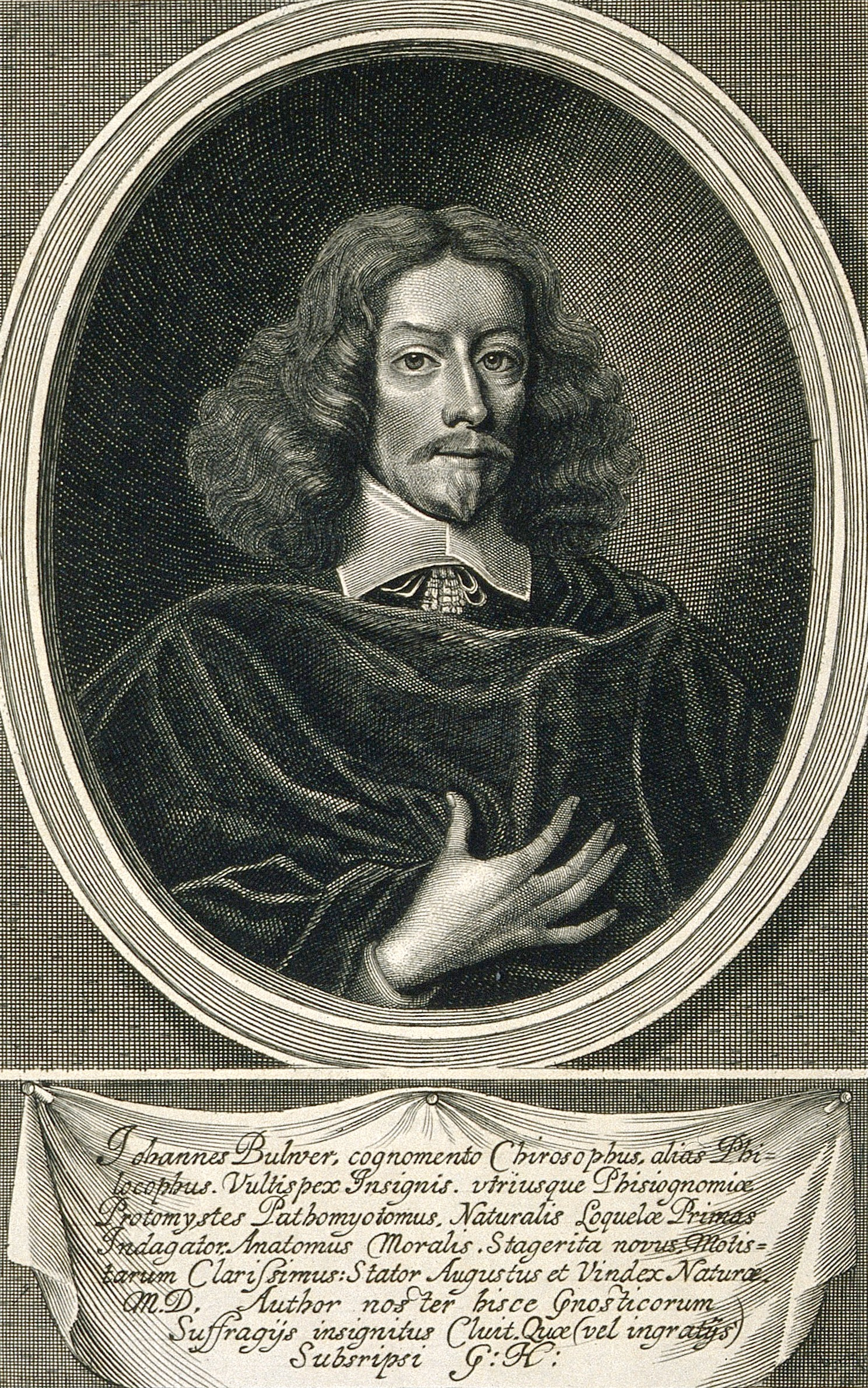
- Engraving of John Bulwer by William Faithorne. Made around 1653 for the book Anthropometamorphosis
- Born: John Bulwer; 16 May 1606 baptised London, England
- Died: circa 1 October 1656 (aged 50); London
- Resting place: St Giles in the Fields, Westminster.
- Education: Probably went to Oxford.
- Alma mater: Got an MD from an unknown European university
- Occupation: Physician
- Known for: writer of five works exploring the Body and human communication, particularly by gesture.
- Title: Chirosopher
- Spouse: Woman only known as the "Widow of Middleton"
- Children: Adopted daughter, named Chirothea Johnson
- Parent(s): Thomas Bulwer and Marie Evans

Signature
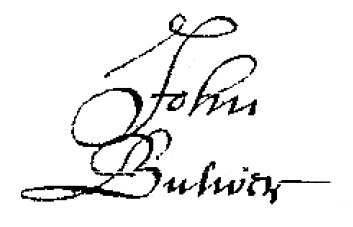

John Bulwer (baptised 16 May 1606 – buried 16 October 1656) was an English physician and early Baconian natural philosopher who wrote five works exploring the body and human communication, particularly by gesture. He was the first person in England to propose educating deaf people, the plans for an Academy he outlines in Philocophus and The Dumbe mans academie.

== Life ==
John Bulwer was born in London in 1606 and continued to work and live in the city until his death in October 1656 when he was buried in St Giles in the Fields, Westminster. He was the only surviving son of an apothecary named Thomas Bulwer and Marie Evans of St. Albans. On her death in 1638 John Bulwer inherited some property in St Albans from which he derived a small income. Although information about his education is unclear, there is evidence that he was probably educated in Oxford as an unmatriculated student in the 1620s. His known friends had nearly all been educated there and he supported William Laud and the High Church party during the Civil War. Later in his life, between 1650 and 1653, he acquired a Medicinae Doctor (M.D.) at an unknown European university. In 1634 he married a woman known only as the "Widow of Middleton" who predeceased him. No children from this marriage are known to have been born. Later in life Bulwer would adopt a girl named Chirothea Johnson, and, as he states in his will "bred her up from a child as my own". She may have been deaf.

== Published works ==
During the English Civil War Bulwer stopped working as a physician and concentrated on his study and writing. All his written works were created between 1640 and until around 1653. In total Bulwer published five works, all of which were either early examples or the first of their kind.

== Chirologia and Chironomia ==
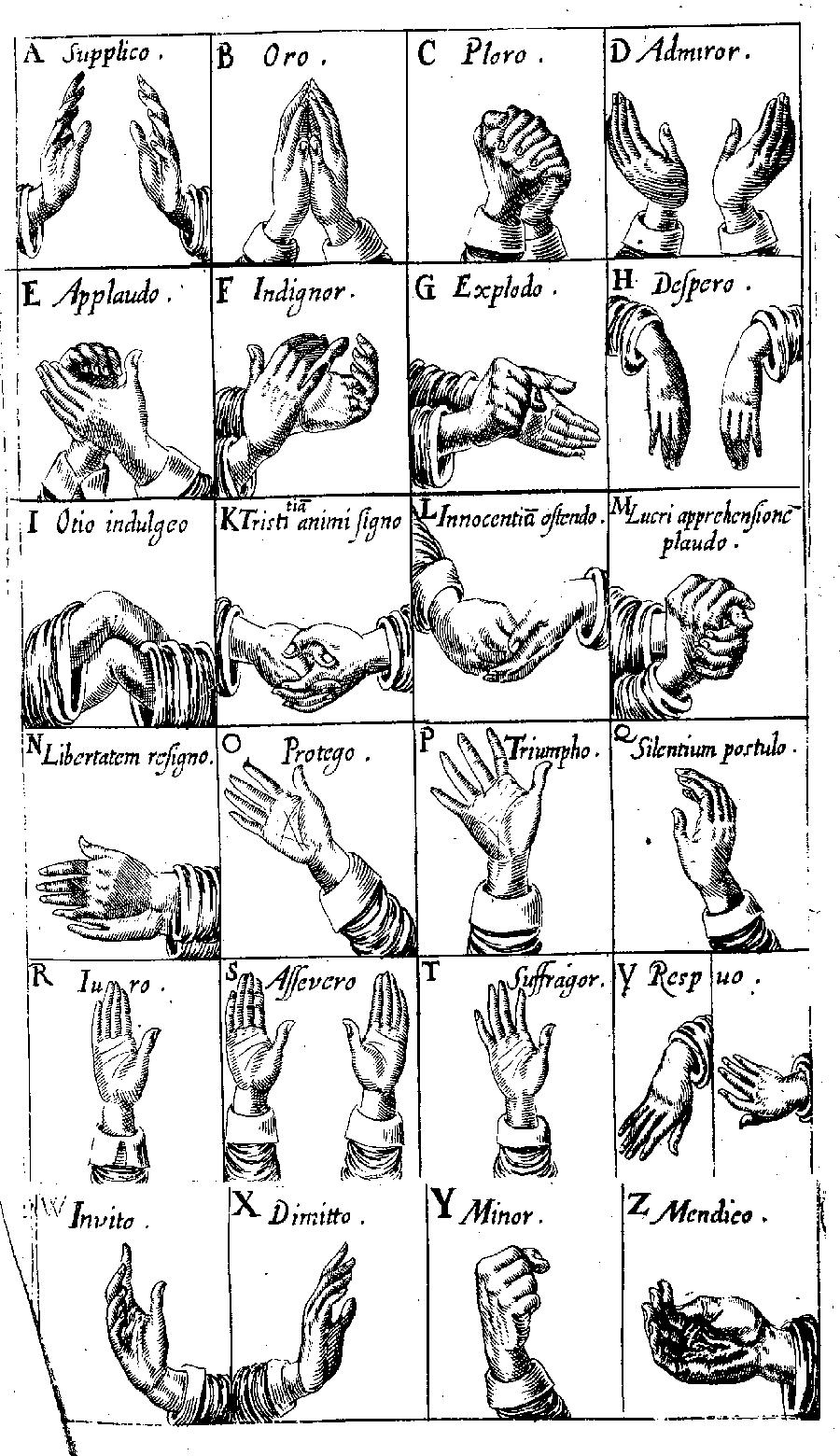
Chirogram from Chirologia, 1644.

Chirologia: or the naturall language of the hand. Composed of the speaking motions, and discoursing gestures thereof. Whereunto is added Chironomia: or, the art of manuall rhetoricke. Consisting of the natural expressions, digested by art in the hand, as the chiefest instrument of eloquence. London: Thomas Harper. 1644.

Although issued as a single volume Chirologia and Chironomia have different pagination. Bulwer always referred to them as separate works but over time they have come to be seen as a single volume. Francis Bacon had described gestures as "Transient Hieroglyphics" and suggested that Gesture should be the focus of a new scientific enquiry, Bulwer was the first to undertake the task. For Bulwer Gesture was a universal character of Reason.

[The hand] “speaks all languages, and as universal character of Reason is generally understood and known by all Nations, among the formal differences of their Tongue. And being the only speech that is natural to Man, it may well be called the Tongue and General language of Human Nature, which, without teaching, men in all regions of the habitable world doe at the first sight most easily understand”

Chirologia is often cited as Bulwer’s link to later Deaf studies because it focuses on hand gestures which have come to be seen as the domain of deaf communication. In fact the book only mentions the deaf in passing. He believed it was Nature's recompense that deaf people should communicate through gesture, "that wonder of necessity that Nature worketh in men that are born deafe and dumb; who can argue and dispute rhetorically by signes" (page 5). The handshapes described in Chirologia are still used in British Sign Language. Bulwer does mention fingerspelling describing how "the ancients did...order an alphabet upon the joints of their fingers...showing those letters by a distinct and grammatical succession", in addition to their use as mnemonic devices Bulwer suggest that manual alphabets could be "ordered to serve for privy ciphers for any secret intimation" (Chironomia, p149). Chirologia is a compendium of manual gestures, citing their meaning and use from a wide range of sources; literary, Religious and Medical. Chironomia is a manual for the effective use of Gesture in public speaking.

== Philocophus ==
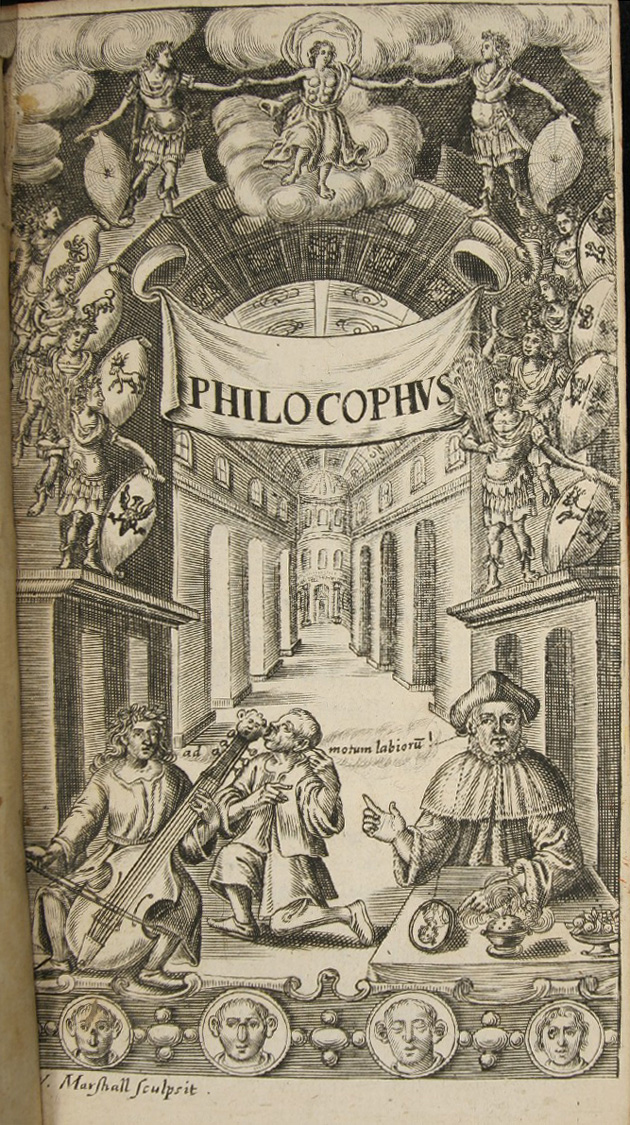
Frontispiece engraving from Philocophus showing a deaf man "hearing" music by bone conduction through the teeth.

Philocophus: or, the deafe and dumbe mans friend. Exhibiting the philosophicall verity of that subtile art, which may inable one with an observant eie, to heare what any man speaks by the moving of his lips. Upon the same ground, with the advantage of an historical exemplification, apparently proving, that a man borne deafe and dumbe, may be taught to heare the sound of words with his eie, & thence learne to speake with his tongue. By J. B. surnamed the Chirosopher London: Humphrey Moseley 1648.

Bulwer was the first person in Britain to discuss the possibility educating deaf people, and the novelty of the idea, and seeming impossibility, is shown when Bulwer tries to persuade "some rational men" to support the establishment of a "new Academy", to them "the attempt seemed paradoxical, prodigious and hyperbolical; that it did rather amuse than satisfy their understanding" (from the introduction). To persuade these "knowing men" of "the philosophical verity of this Art" (the education of the deaf) he sets out in this volume to explain the theory and empirical evidence for its possibility. Some evidence comes from the account given by Sir Kenelm Digby of a meeting between the Prince of Wales and a deaf Spanish nobleman, Don Luis Velasco. As well as drawing heavily on this account, he also collects information about deaf people living in Britain at that time. Through observations that some deaf people can "hear" the vibrations produced by musical instruments by bone conduction through the teeth, Bulwer came to believe that the body had a commonwealth of senses, for instance the eye could be used to perceive speech by lip-reading.

== Pathomyotomia ==
Pathomyotomia, or a Dissection of the significant Muscles of the Affections of the Mind. Being an Essay to a new Method of observing the most important movings of the Muscles of the Head, as they are the neerest and Immediate Organs of the Voluntarie or Impetuous motions of the Mind. With the Proposall of a new Nomenclature of the Muscles. London: Humphrey Moseley. 1649

This was the first substantial English language work on the muscular basis of emotional expressions. The goal was to present a new and more intuitive system for naming the muscles of the face. A system in which muscles would be named after the passions they were used to express. It would be 200 years before similar ideas would surface in French anatomist and electrophysiologist Duchenne de Boulogne's Mecanisme de la Physiognomie Humaine (1862). The other observation of Duchenne that Bulwer foreshadowed was that the contraction of the orbicularis oculi (the muscle encircling the eye) accompanies genuine smiles of happiness but does not occur in deceptive or non-joyful smiles.

== Anthropometamorphosis ==
Anthropometamorphosis: Man Transform’d, or the Artificial Changeling. Historically presented, in the mad and cruel Gallantry, foolish Bravery, ridiculous Beauty, filthy Fineness, and loathesome Loveliness of most Nations, fashioning & altering their Bodies from the Mould intended by Nature. With a Vindication of the Regular Beauty and Honesty of Nature, and an Appendix of the Pedigree of the English Gallant. London: J. Hardesty. 1650

Anthropometamorphosis was Bulwer's final and most popular work, reprinted at least three times in his lifetime. First in 1650, the second edition of 1653 was much enlarged and illustrated with woodcuts. A third edition "printed for the use and benefit of Thomas Gibbs, gent" was a reissue of the second edition retitled "A view of the People of the whole World". The title literally means ‘humanity-changing’. It could be seen as another work influenced by Francis Bacon, an Anomatia Comparata, a comparison of all the peoples of the world, and in its attack on the cosmetic it does echo Bacon. It is one of the first studies in comparative cultural anthropology albeit with a strong tone of social commentary, "Almost every Nation having a particular whimzey as touching corporall fashions of their own invention" (page 5), Bulwer describes how people modify their bodies and clothes but later commentators have interpreted this ostensible apolitical work as a coded piece of political theory. A political commentary against the artificial (in Bulwer's eyes) regicidal State, and a call to the return to the "natural" form of governance with the King as the symbolic head of the body of England. Bulwer's politics are indivisible from his other thinking, for him Nature was a Monarch, "sovereignty delegated from God". "The beauty of the Universe consists in things perfect and permanent" (p25) ruled over by the monarch, Nature. Although Bulwer does not make any direct reference to the political events in England his approach to the monstrous body echoes the themes of the polemical literature of the time, especially in its focus on the head. The main body of the text consists of 23 sections, of which 15 are concerned with deformations or modifications to the head or face. The book ends with Bulwer stating that he is going to stop writing and return to working as a physician. He writes:

Until now obeying the sacred impulse of the genius operating upon our intellectual complexion, while my mind was carrying me into new things, I executed works not of supererogation, but supplemental to the advancement of sciences. In which I seem to have merited something from the republec of letters (i.e. Literary public): "Of the making of many books there is no end, and the reading of them is a weariness to the flesh" (Eccles xii.12): From now on I shall apply myself entirly to providing for my own health and the health of others. Other things will be done by other lovers of human nature. THE END.

== Manuscripts and other works ==
In addition there are two surviving unpublished manuscripts held at the British Library:

'Philocophus, or the Dumbe mans academie wherein is taught a new and admired art instructing them who are borne Deafe and Dumbe to heare the sound of words with theire eie and thence learne to speake with theire Tongue:' illustrated with engraved plates shewing the different portions of the hands. (Held under Sloane 1788 at the British Library).

This manuscript shows that Bulwer was the first person in England to acquire and translate Juan Pablo Bonet's Reducción de las letras y arte para enseñar a hablar a los mudos ("Summary of the letters and the art of teaching speech to the mute") because it contains images cut and pasted directly from Bonet's book as well as commentary on the methods described therein. This manuscript is usually referred to as the Dumbe mans academie to differentiate it clearly from the earlier published work also entitled Philocophus.

The other manuscript held is entitled Vultispex criticus, seu physiognomia medici. A manuscript on Physiognomy.

There are also a selection of works that are now lost including one study, entitled Glossiatrus, on speech disorders and another, Otiatrus on hearing disorders. Glossiatrus was the first monograph on speech disorders ever written.
