= USS Addie and Carrie =

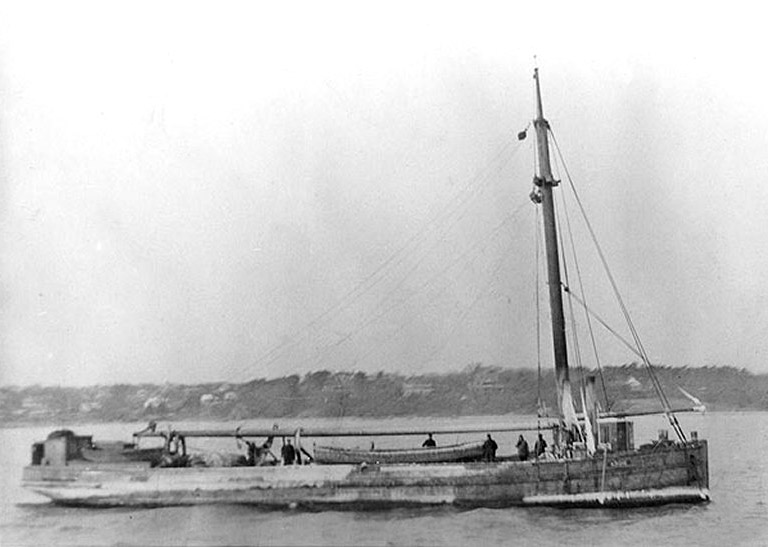

History
- Launched: 1884 at City Island, NY
- Acquired: 1918
- Out of service: 20 May 1919
- Fate: Returned to her owners, the T. A. Scott Wrecking Co., New London, CT.

General characteristics
- Displacement: 179 tons
- Length: 113 ft 2 in (34.49 m)
- Beam: 29 ft 4 in (8.94 m)
- Draft: 5 ft 9 in (1.75 m)
- Propulsion: steam
- Speed: 12.5 knots (23.2 km/h; 14.4 mph)
- Complement: 10

Addie and Carrie (Id. No. 3226) — a wooden-hulled, non-self-propelled barge built in 1884 at City Island, NY — was inspected in the 2d Naval District on 30 July 1918, Later that day she sank at New London, Connecticut after the swell from a submarine and a sub-chaser forced her against some rocks. Raised, repaired and returned to service. On 6 September 1918, she was ordered to be taken over by the US Navy. A letter was accordingly dispatched to her owners, the T. A. Scott Wrecking Co. of New London, Connecticut, on 9 September, and the craft was acquired by the Navy shortly thereafter. Designated Id. No. 3226, Addie and Carrie — sometimes referred to in dispatch traffic as merely Addie — served as a salvage barge attached to the Salvage Station, New London, through the end of hostilities and up until the termination of all Navy salvage activities of privately owned vessels was ordered discontinued on 15 May 1919. Five days later, Addie and Carrie was returned to her prewar owners for a resumption of civilian pursuits.
