= George Stanhope =

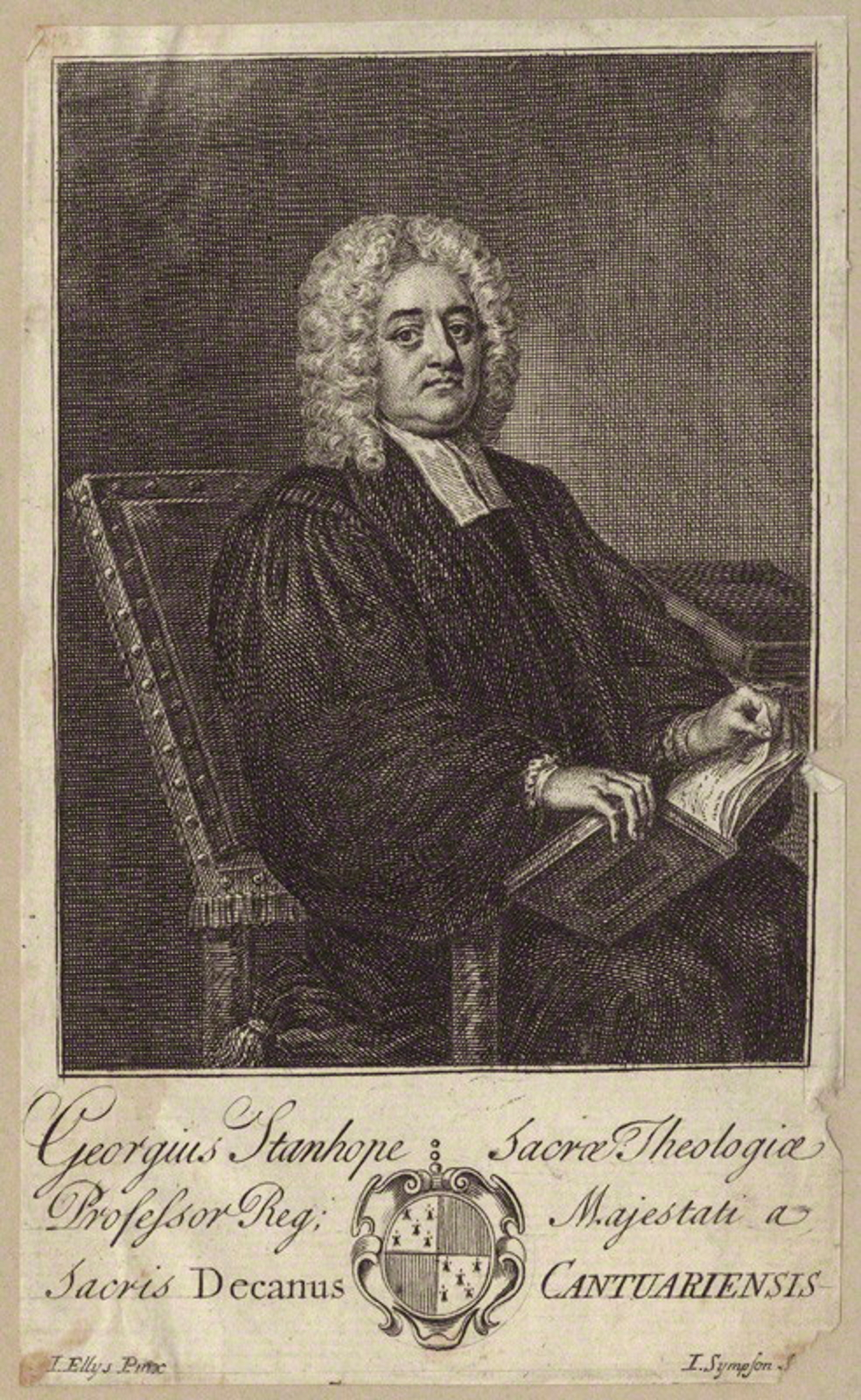
- Born: 5 March 1660; Hartshorne, Derbyshire
- Died: 18 March 1728; Bath
- Education: Uppingham School, Eton College and King's College, Cambridge
- Occupation: Clergyman
- Children: A son and 5 daughters
- Parent: Thomas Stanhope

George Stanhope (5 March 1660 – 18 March 1728) was a clergyman of the Church of England, rising to be Dean of Canterbury and a Royal Chaplain. He was also amongst the commissioners responsible for the building of fifty new churches in London, and a leading figure in church politics of the early 18th century. Stanhope also founded the Stanhope School in 1715.

== Biography ==
George was born on 5 March 1660 at Hartshorne, near Swadlincote in south Derbyshire, son of Thomas Stanhope, rector of Hartshorne, Derbyshire, vicar of St Margaret's Church, Leicester, and chaplain to the Earls of Chesterfield and Clare. His grandfather, George Stanhope (d. 1644), was canon and precentor of York from 1631, and was rector of Wheldrake, Yorkshire, and chaplain to James I and Charles I; he was dispossessed during the Commonwealth. The younger George was educated at Uppingham School in Rutland, Eton College and King's College in Cambridge. He graduated in 1681 and obtained his Master of Arts in 1685 and entered into Holy Orders, however he remained three years longer at Cambridge. In 1687 he was appointed curate of Stow cum Quy, Cambridgeshire, and in 1688 he was appointed rector of Tewin, Hertfordshire (Tewin Register), and on 3 August 1689 of Lewisham, Kent, being presented to the latter by Lord Dartmouth, to whose son he was tutor, both then and apparently for five years afterwards. He became a Doctor of Divinity in 1697, and he was appointed chaplain to William III and Mary II. In 1701 he was appointed Boyle lecturer. In the year following he was presented to the vicarage of Deptford, was reappointed Royal chaplain by Queen Anne, and on 23 March 1704 was made Dean of Canterbury, still retaining Lewisham and Deptford.

== Church politics ==
Stanhope, as Dean, entered the lower house of Convocation at a period of bitter conflict with the upper house under Francis Atterbury's leadership. As a man of peace, in friendship with Robert Nelson on one side, and with Edward Tenison and Gilbert Burnet on the other, Stanhope was proposed by the moderate party as prolocutor in 1705, but was defeated by the high churchman, Dr. William Binckes. In 1711, Stanhope was among the founding group that would organise the building of fifty new churches to replace those lost in the Great Fire of London, and was re-appointed in 1715 after the accession of George I. After Atterbury's elevation to the see of Rochester in 1713 he succeeded him as prolocutor, and was twice re-elected.

The most prominent incident of his presidency was the censure of the Arian doctrine of Samuel Clarke in 1714. Early in 1717 the lower house of Convocation also censured a sermon by Bishop Benjamin Hoadly which had been preached before the king and published by royal command. To stop the matter from going to the upper house, convocation was hastily prorogued (May 1717). It was thenceforth formally summoned from time to time, only to be instantly prorogued. On the occasion of one of these prorogations Stanhope broke up the meeting (14 February 1718) in order to prevent Tenison from reading a protestation in favour of Hoadly. It was probably in consequence of this action that he lost the royal chaplaincy, which he had held in the first year of George I. From this date the Convocation of the English Clergy remained in abeyance until its revival in the province of Canterbury in 1852, and in that of York in 1861.

Stanhope was one of the great preachers of his time, and preached before Queen Anne in St Paul's Cathedral in 1706 and 1710 on two of the great services of national thanksgiving for the Earl of Marlborough's victories. In 1719 he had a correspondence with Atterbury, which dealt partly with the appointment of Thomas Sherlock, afterwards Bishop of London, to one of his curacies.

Stanhope founded the Charity School in High Street, Deptford, known as Dean Stanhope's School. Dean Stanhope's school eventually merged and became part of the Addey and Stanhope School. Following the merger, the building was demolished to make way for shops in 1899.

Stanhope School 18th Century

He died at Bath on 18 March 1728, and was buried in St. Mary's church, Lewisham, where a monument with a long inscription was erected to his memory. According to Daniel Lysons (1796):

His monument, the inscription on which has been already given, deserved a better fate than to be thrown aside in the vault, where it now lies, when the church was rebuilt. A place should have been found within the new walls for the memorial of a man who was for thirty-eight years so distinguished an ornament of the parish.

There were two portraits of him in the Deanery at Canterbury.

== Family ==
Stanhope married first Olivia, daughter of Charles Cotton of Beresford, Staffordshire, and had by her a son, who predeceased him, and five daughters. (One of their daughters, Mary, married William Burnet, son of Gilbert.) After Olivia's death in 1707, Stanhope married in 1709 Ann Parker, half-sister of Sir Charles Wager; she survived him by two years.

== Literary works ==
Stanhope's literary works were chiefly translations or adaptations. He translated Epictetus (1694; 2nd ed. 1700, 8vo), Charron's 'Books on Wisdom' (1697, 3 vols.), and Meditations by Marcus Aurelius (1697; 2nd ed. 1699, 4to). He modernised The Christian Directory of Robert Parsons the Jesuit (1703, 8vo; 4th ed. 1716); dedicated to Princess Anne a volume of Pious Meditations (1701; 2nd ed. 1720), drawn from St. Augustine, St. Anselm, and St. Bernard; and he translated the Greek Devotions of Bishop Lancelot Andrewes. Hutton, who edited the posthumous edition (1730) of his translation of Andrewes, likened Stanhope's character to that of Andrewes. But the style of the translation is absolutely unlike the original. In place of the barbed point and abruptness of the Greek, the English is all smoothed out. Subsequent editions of the work appeared in 1808, 1811, 1815, 1818, 1826, and 1832. Stanhope followed the same paraphrastic system in a translation of Thomas à Kempis's Imitatio Christi, which appeared in 1698 under the title The Christian's Pattern, or a Treatise of the Imitation of Christ, 2 pts. London, 8vo. A fifth edition appeared in 1706, a twelfth in 1733, and new editions in 1746, 1751, 1759 1793, 1814, and 1865. The book is dedicated to Mrs Julia Shalcrosse of Woodhall, Hatfield He describes himself as "Your most affectionate cousin." In 1886 Henry Morley edited it for the collection of a hundred books chosen by John Lubbock. 'The pithy style of the original is lost in flowing sentences that pleased the reader in Queen Anne's reign.'

Stanhope's principal contribution to divinity is The Paraphrase and Comment on the Epistles and Gospels (vols. i. and ii. 1705, vol. iii. 1706, vol. iv. 1708), dedicated originally to Queen Anne, and in a new edition to George I on his accession (1714). It was a favourite book in the 18th century. Its defect is the neglect of the organic relation of collect, epistle, and gospel; but it contains much that is solid, sensible, and practical in clear and easy language, quite free from controversial bitterness. In the preface Stanhope says that the work was planned for the use of the little Prince George, who died in 1700.

Besides the works mentioned above Stanhope published:

1. Fifteen Sermons 1700.
2. The Boyle Lecture 1702.
3. Twelve Sermons 1726.

Church of England titles
Preceded by George Hooper	Dean of Canterbury; 1704–1728	Succeeded by Elias Sydall
