= Hartshorne, Derbyshire =

Village in Derbyshire, England

Coordinates: 52.789°N 1.526°W

Hartshorne
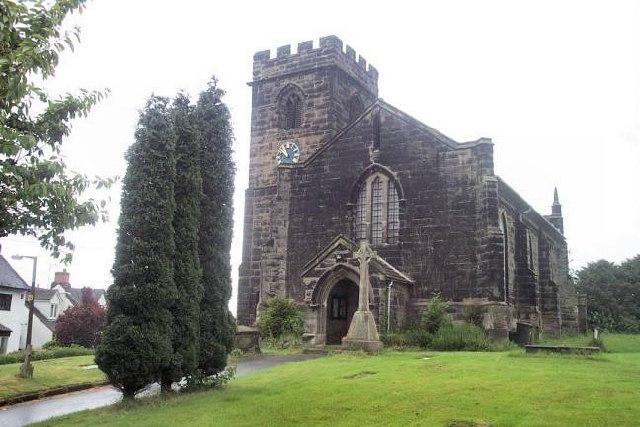
- St Peter's church

- Location within Derbyshire
- Population: 3,888 (2011)
- OS grid reference: SK320213
- District: South Derbyshire
- Shire county: Derbyshire
- Region: East Midlands
- Country: England
- Sovereign state: United Kingdom
- Post town: Swadlincote
- Postcode district: DE11
- Police: Derbyshire
- Fire: Derbyshire
- Ambulance: East Midlands

Hartshorne is a village and civil parish in the English county of Derbyshire. The population of the civil parish at the 2011 census was 3,888. It is north of the town of Swadlincote.

The name is pronounced "Harts-horn"; the sh is not a digraph, as this is a compound.

== Etymology ==
The name of the village is first attested in the Domesday Book of 1086, where it appears in the spelling Heorteshorne. This comes from the Old English word heorot ('hart, adult male red deer') in the genitive case, compounded with the word horn ('horn'), and once meant 'hart's antler'. It appears that the name originally denoted not the village itself but the neighbouring hill to the south-east of the village, now called Horn Hill, which was thought to resemble a stag's antler.

== History ==
Hartshorne was mentioned in the Domesday Book as belonging to Henry de Ferrers and being worth ten shillings. It passed to the Ireland family in the 14th century, and subsequently to the family of the Foljambe baronets.

The Rector of Hartshorne, William Dethick, founded a free school for local children in 1626.

In 1800, the owner of the Manor, William Bailey Cant, left it to the lawyer Thomas Erskine, in recognition of his role in the case of John Horne Tooke.

== Amenities ==
Local pubs include the Admiral Rodney, named after the 1st Baron Rodney (1719–1792); the Mill Wheel (with an 18th-century mill wheel measuring 20 feet (6.1 m) in diameter); the Bulls Head; and the Greyhound. "he Chesterfield Arms was demolished in September 2009. The Snooty Fox (formerly the Dominoes) was demolished in 2009. The New Inn closed in the 1960s and was then used as a hairdressing salon before being demolished in 1975 to make a car park extension for the Admiral Rodney.

The Old Manor House in the northern part of the village is a Grade II* listed 17th-century timbered building on Main Street. It was built for one John Benskin in 1629 according to parish rate records. Situated south west of St Peter's Church in the southern part of the village, it is distinct from The Manor House (also known as the Old Hall) in the northern part of the village.

== Transport ==
The local bus service is the No.2 maintained by Arriva Midlands between Derby and Swadlincote via Melbourne, this was previously a Trent route 168 & Arriva route No.69.

== Notable residents ==
- George Stanhope, Dean of Canterbury, was born here in 1660

== Gallery ==
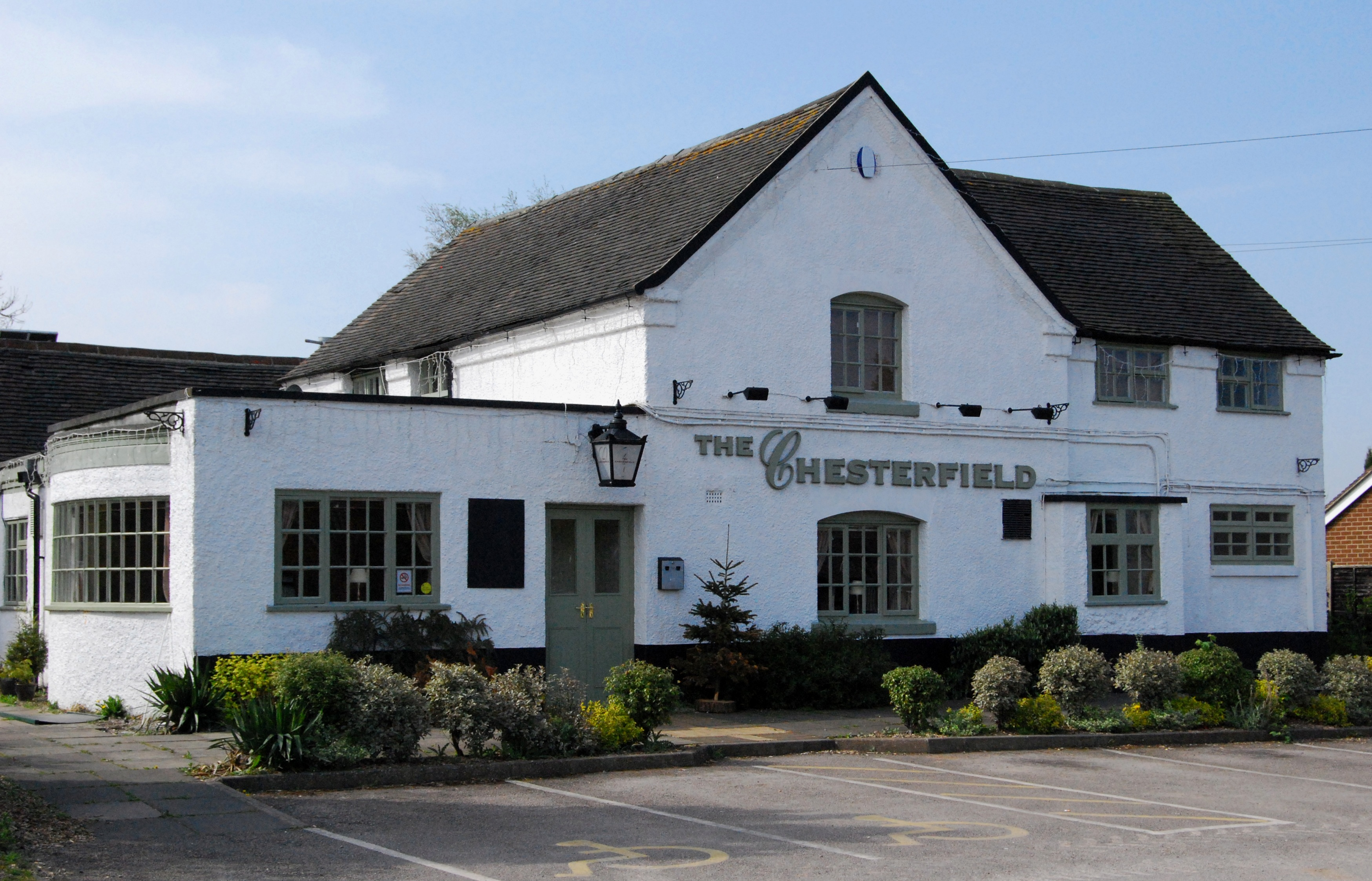
Chesterfield Arms, Hartshorne (now demolished)

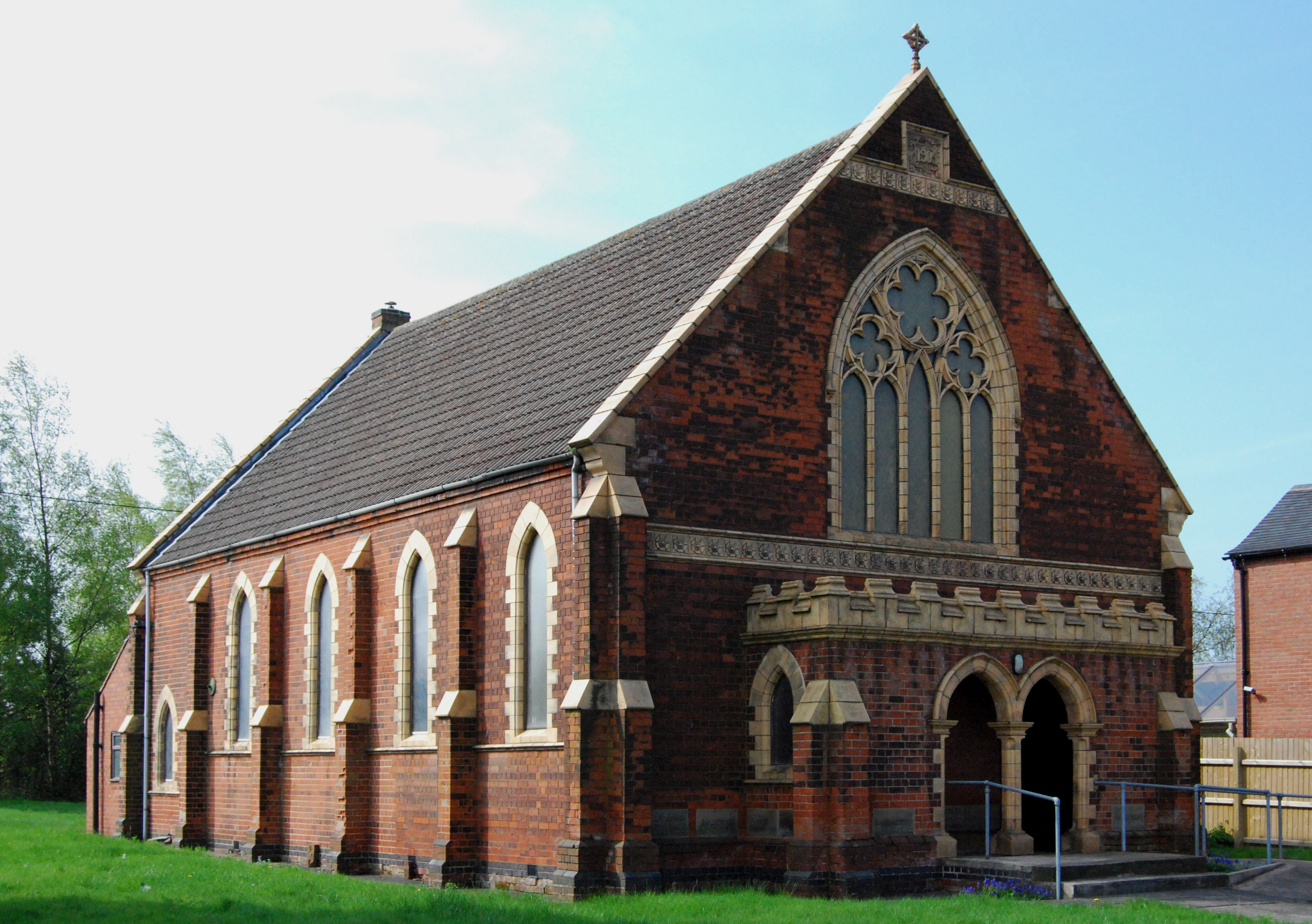
Methodist Chapel, Hartshorne

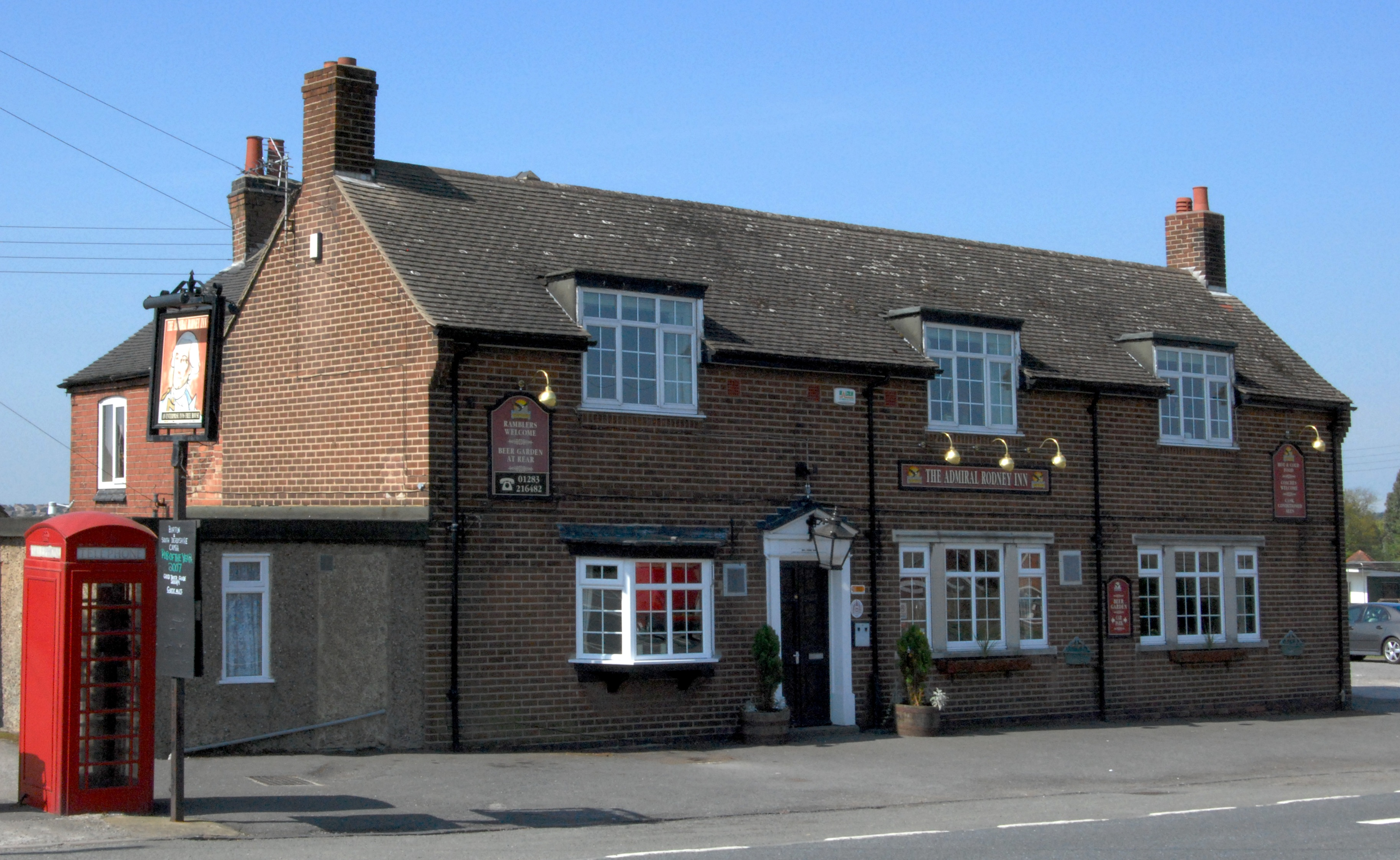
Admiral Rodney, Hartshorne

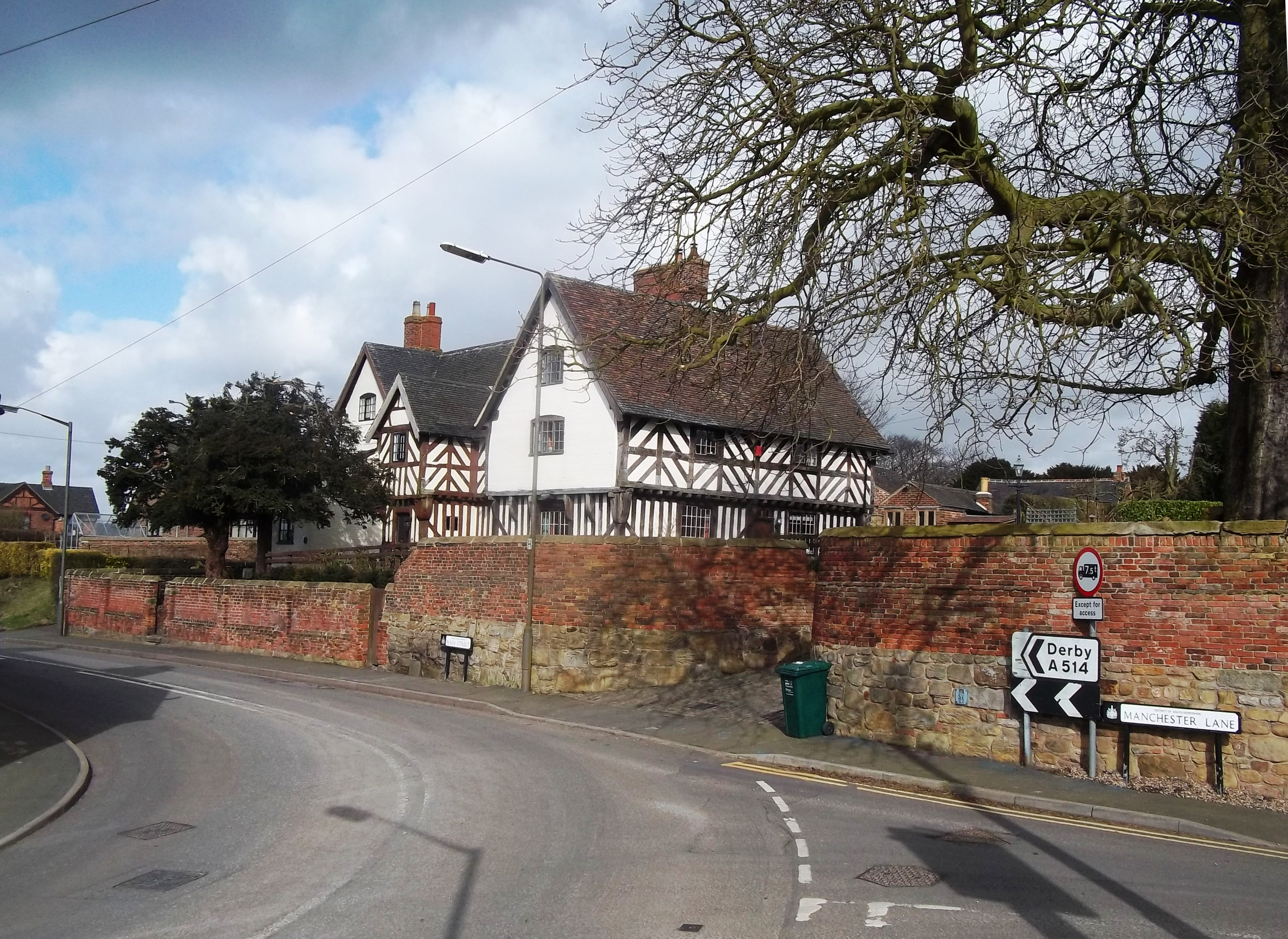
The Old Manor House

== See also ==
- Listed buildings in Hartshorne, Derbyshire

== Bibliography ==
- Williams, Roy (29 October 2010). "Hartshorne Manor". Hartshorne on the Web. Hartshorne Parish Council.
- History, Topography, and Directory of Derbyshire. Littleover, Derby: T. Bulmer & Co. 26 July 1895.
- Cameron, John (1876). "Index to places in the Parish of Hartshorn". Book of Reference to the Plan of the Parish of Eckingham in the county of Derby. London: Eyre and Spottiswoode.
