= Amable de Bourzeys =

French writer and academic

Amable de Bourzeis
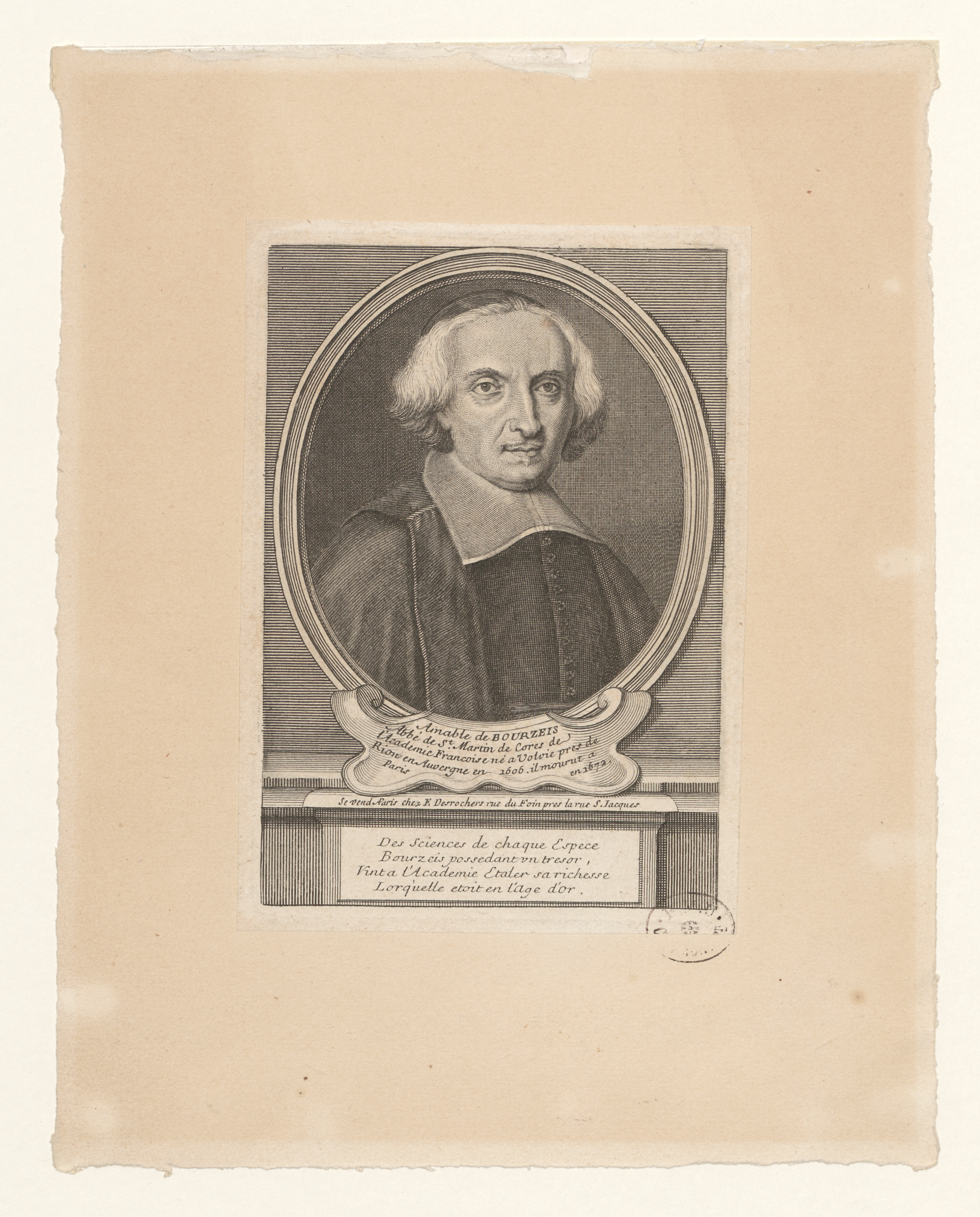
- Born: 6 April 1606; Volvic, France
- Died: 2 August 1672 (aged 66); Paris, France
- Known for: Founding member of the Académie française and Académie des Inscriptions et Belles-Lettres

Amable de Bourzeis (6 April 1606, Volvic – 2 August 1672, Paris) was a French churchman, writer, hellenist, and Academician.

A founding member of the Académie française, in 1663 Jean-Baptiste Colbert also made him one of the five founding members of the Académie des Inscriptions et Belles-Lettres.

== Publications (partial list) ==
- Discours à monseigneur le prince palatin pour l'exhorter à entrer dans la communion de l'Église catholique, 1646, Read online
- Lettre d'un abbé à un président, sur la conformité de Augustin d'Hippone avec le concile de Trente, touchant la manière dont les justes peuvent délaisser Dieu, et estre ensuite délaissez de luy, 1649
- Contre l'adversaire du concile de Trente et de sainct Augustin : dialogue premier, où l'on découvre la confusion & les contradictions estranges des dogmes théologiques du P. Petau, & où l'on réfute un libelle du mesme père, intitulé insolemment « Dispute contre l'hétérodoxe », c'est-à-dire contre l'hérétique : où est aussi réfuté par occasion un petit libelle de M. Morel dont le titre est « Défense de la confession de la foy catholique alléguée, etc. », 1650, Read online
- Apologie du concile de Trente et de sainct Augustin : contre les nouvelles opinions du censeur latin de la Lettre franc̜oise d'un abbé à un evesque; où est refutée aussi dans une preface une autre censure latine de la preface franc̜oise de la Lettre d'un abbé à un president, 1650
- Conférences de deux théologiens molinistes sur un libelle faussement intitulé : Les sentiments de saint Augustin et de toute l'Église, 1650
- Sermons sur divers mystères de la religion et plusieurs fêtes des saints, prêchés dans Paris, par l'abbé de Bourzeis, 1672

Ouvrages parfois attribués

- Saint Augustin victorieux de Calvin et de Molina, ou Réfutation d'un livre intitulé « Le Secret du Jansénisme », 1652
- Traité des droits de la Reyne tres-chrestienne sur divers Estats de la monarchie d'Espagne, 1667

=== Sources and bibliography ===
- Oscar Honoré, Honoré [Amable] de Bourzeïs. Un académicien oublié, le premier XXXVe fauteuil, Paris, 1879
- Akimid Edo [pseudonyme de Yasushi Noro], « Note sur la naissance et la mort d'Amable Bourzeis » in Courrier du Centre international Blaise Pascal, Clermont-Ferrand, No. 24, 2002, p. 47-50
- Yasushi Noro, Un littérateur face aux événements du XVIIe : Amable Bourzeis et les événements dans sa biographie, thèse, Université Blaise Pascal, Clermont-Ferrand II, 2006
- Claude-François Lambert, Histoire littéraire du règne de Louis XIV, Prault, Paris, t. 1, 1753, p. 41-46
- Philippe Le Bas, L'Univers. Histoire et description de tous les peuples. Dictionnaire encyclopédique de la France, Firmin Didot, Paris, t. 3, 1842, p. 285
