= John Addey (shipbuilder) =

English shipwright

- Born: 1550
- Died: 16 April 1606; Deptford
- Occupation: Shipwright

John Addey (1550 – 16 April 1606) was a master shipwright at Deptford Dockyard.

Addey left £200 to the poor of Deptford which was invested in land on Church Street and provided an income to maintain a school in Deptford; his will also mentioned London's Shipwrights Hall. The Addey School was built in 1821 and enlarged in 1862. It amalgamated with Dean George Stanhope's School to form Addey and Stanhope School, and moved to New Cross Road in 1899. Addey was buried in St Nicholas Church in Deptford and there are plaques dedicated to him on the exterior north wall.

"The above named John Addey by his will gave to his executor two hundred pounds to procure a perpetual annuity towards the relief of the poor people of Deptford to last forever. There with was purchased a piece of ground on the east side of Church street in this town, the rents and profits arising therefrom and from the buildings thereon exceed on this present year 1862 six hundred and fifty pounds from this fund forty shillings was are annually given to one hundred poor parishioners of Deptford, and large schools for poor children of the town are maintained. This tablet was erected by trustees of the charity to commemorate this good deed of a good man."

John Addey commemoration plaque
