= 1609 =

1609 in various calendars
- Gregorian calendar: 1609; MDCIX
- Ab urbe condita: 2362
- Armenian calendar: 1058; ԹՎ ՌԾԸ
- Assyrian calendar: 6359
- Balinese saka calendar: 1530–1531
- Bengali calendar: 1015–1016
- Berber calendar: 2559
- English Regnal year: 6 Ja. 1 – 7 Ja. 1
- Buddhist calendar: 2153
- Burmese calendar: 971
- Byzantine calendar: 7117–7118
- Chinese calendar: 戊申年 (Earth Monkey); 4306 or 4099 — to — 己酉年 (Earth Rooster); 4307 or 4100
- Coptic calendar: 1325–1326
- Discordian calendar: 2775
- Ethiopian calendar: 1601–1602
- Hebrew calendar: 5369–5370
- Hindu calendars
- Vikram Samvat: 1665–1666
- Shaka Samvat: 1530–1531
- Kali Yuga: 4709–4710
- Holocene calendar: 11609
- Igbo calendar: 609–610
- Iranian calendar: 987–988
- Islamic calendar: 1017–1018
- Japanese calendar: Keichō 14 (慶長１４年)
- Javanese calendar: 1529–1530
- Julian calendar: Gregorian minus 10 days
- Korean calendar: 3942
- Minguo calendar: 303 before ROC 民前303年
- Nanakshahi calendar: 141
- Thai solar calendar: 2151–2152
- Tibetan calendar: ས་ཕོ་སྤྲེ་ལོ་ (male Earth-Monkey); 1735 or 1354 or 582 — to — ས་མོ་བྱ་ལོ་ (female Earth-Bird); 1736 or 1355 or 583

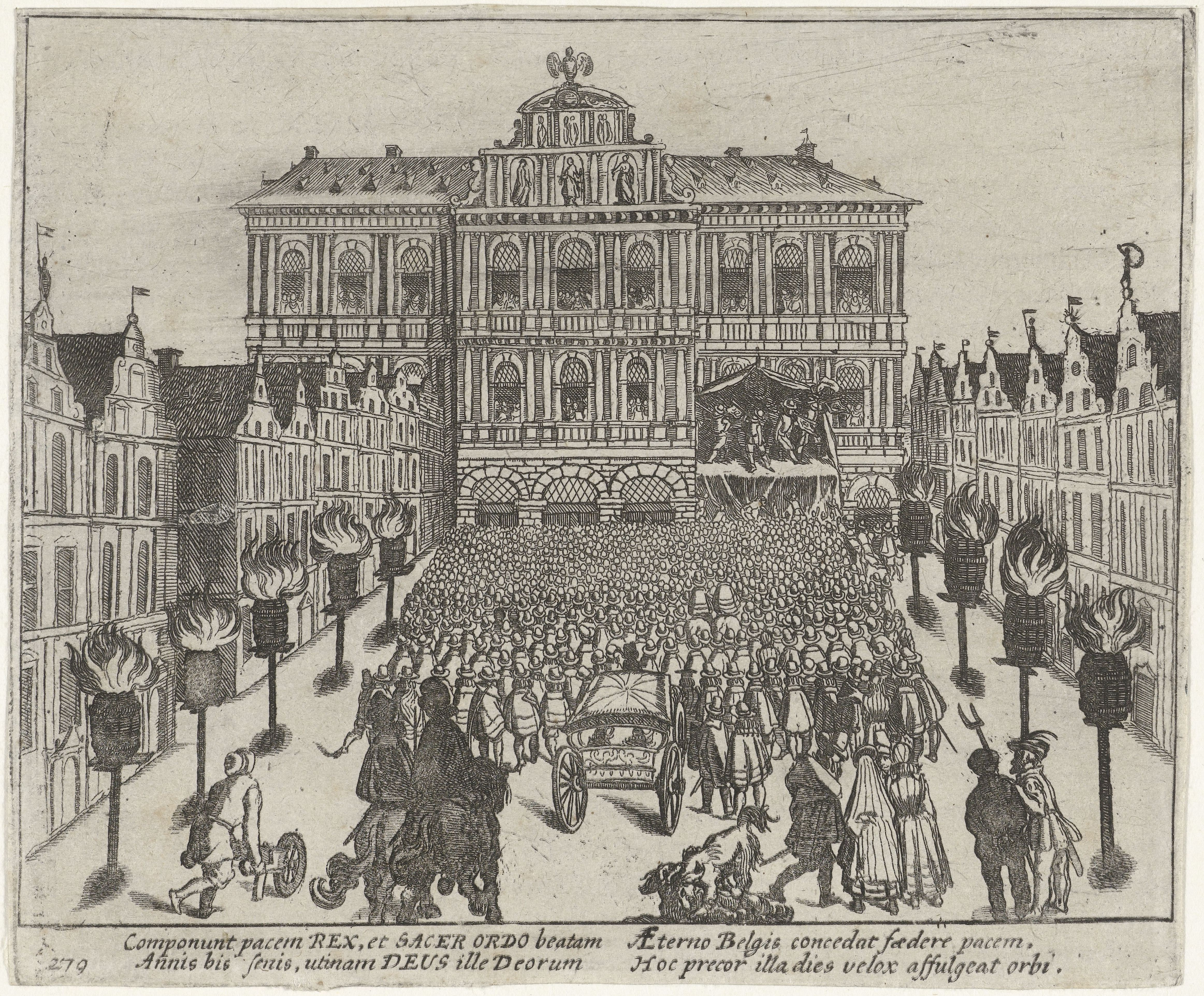
April 9: The Twelve Years' Truce is signed by the Netherlands and Spain

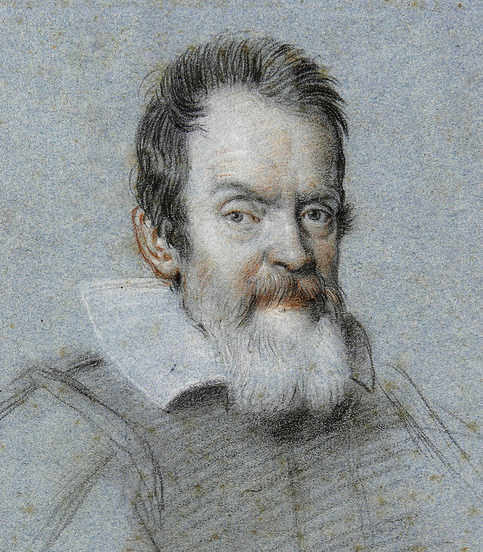
August 25: Galileo demonstrates his first telescope.

1609 (MDCIX) was a common year starting on Thursday of the Gregorian calendar and a common year starting on Sunday of the Julian calendar, the 1609th year of the Common Era (CE) and Anno Domini (AD) designations, the 609th year of the 2nd millennium, the 9th year of the 17th century, and the 10th and last year of the 1600s decade. As of the start of 1609, the Gregorian calendar was 10 days ahead of the Julian calendar, which remained in localized use until 1923.

== Events ==
=== January–March ===
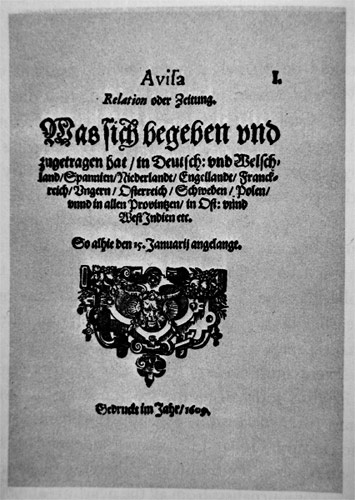
January 15: Avisa newspaper begins publication.

- January 12 – The Basque witch trials are started in Spain as the court of the Inquisition at Logroño receives a letter from the commissioner of the village of Zugarramurdi, and orders the arrest of four women, including María de Jureteguía and María Chipía de Barrenetxea.
- January 15 – One of the world's first newspapers, Avisa Relation oder Zeitung, begins publication in Wolfenbüttel (Holy Roman Empire).
- January 31 – The Bank of Amsterdam is established.
- February 4 – The last day of Keichō 慶長 13 (according to the Japanese lunar calendar).
- March 11 – The Swedish Army, under the command of General Jacob De la Gardie, begins marching east from Vyborg (at this time, part of the Swedish Empire, modern-day Russia) in order to defend the Russian Empire against the Polish-Lithuanian Commonwealth in the course of the Polish–Muscovite War.
- March 19 – The Dutch warship Mauritius sinks off the coast of the Cape of Cape Lopes Gonçalves on the modern-day West African nation of Gabon. The wreckage of the Mauritius will not be located until 375 years later, in 1985.
- March 24 – Led by the Grand Hetman of Lithuania, Jan Karol Chodkiewicz, the Lithuanian Navy breaks the blockade of Riga by sinking two Swedish Navy warships off the coast of Salacgrīva.
- March 25 – Johann Wilhelm, the Roman Catholic Duke of the United Duchies of Jülich-Cleves-Berg in Germany, dies at the capital in Düsseldorf with no heirs. On April 2, his widow, Duchess Antoinette of Lorraine establishes a regency to determine who the successor will be, prompting the War of the Jülich Succession between the states of the Protestant Union and the states of the Catholic League.

=== April–June ===
- April 4
  - King Philip III of Spain signs an edict for the expulsion of the Moriscos from his country with effect from September 11.
  - English explorer Henry Hudson, in the service of the Dutch East India Company, sets out from Amsterdam in the Halve Maen.
- April 5 – Invasion of Ryukyu in Japan: Soldiers of the Shimazu clan capture the castle on Ryukyu Island, beginning to make the Ryukyu Kingdom a vassal of Satsuma Han, but Ryukyu is still allowed to keep itself a tribute state of the Ming and Qing dynasties.
- April 9 – The Netherlands and Spain agree to the Twelve Years' Truce (which lasts until 1621) in the Eighty Years' War, with the signing of the Treaty of Antwerp, allowing the Dutch East India Company to trade within the Spanish Empire.
- May 20 – London publisher Thomas Thorpe issues Shake-speares Sonnets, with a dedication to "Mr. W.H.", and the poem A Lover's Complaint appended; it is uncertain whether this publication has Shakespeare's authority.
- May 23 – The Second Virginia Charter is officially ratified; it is intended to replace the council with a governor, who has absolute control in the colony.
- June 2 – With the Sea Venture as its flagship, a fleet of nine English ships and more than 500 passengers altogether, departs from England to bring supplies to the English settlement in Jamestown, Virginia. The fleet runs into a storm in July and the Sea Venture is wrecked in the Bermuda islands on July 24.
- June 10 – The War of the Jülich Succession begins as the Margraviate of Brandenburg and the Duchy of Palatinate-Neuburg sign a treaty at Dortmund and then send troops to establish Protestant Union rule in the Roman Catholic United Duchies of Jülich-Cleves-Berg.
- June 16 – The Battle of Tashiskari is fought as General Giorgi Saakadze of the Georgian Kingdom of Kartli repels invading troops from the Ottoman Empire before they can capture Tbilisi.
- June 29 – A fleet of ships from the Kingdom of Spain, assisted by a French warship, fights a battle in the Mediterranean Sea against a larger fleet of 23 ships from the North African Eyalet of Tunisia and sinks 21 of them. The other two Tunisian ships are captured.

=== July–September ===
- July 4 – French explorer Samuel de Champlain and his entourage of 60 men in 24 canoes become the first Europeans to enter Lake Champlain, located between the modern-day U.S. states of Vermont and New York.
- July 9 – Bohemia is granted freedom of religion by a 'Letter of Majesty'.
- July 10 – The German Catholic League is formed in Munich by Maximilian I, Elector of Bavaria to counteract the Protestant Union. Maximilian assembles representatives from Augsburg, Konstanz, Passau, Regensburg, and Würzburg in an alliance "for the defense of the Catholic religion and peace" within the Holy Roman Empire.
- July 23 – A three-day hurricane begins in the Caribbean Sea and separates the nine London Company's ships and their 600 passengers who are en route to relieve the Jamestown settlement. One ship sinks, and the flagship is wrecked. Less than 300 settlers make it to Virginia.
- July 25
  - The Sea Venture, flagship of the nine-ship fleet of the London Company is deliberately wrecked at Bermuda during a storm, as Admiral George Somers drives the ship into the reefs of Discovery Bay in order to prevent the ship from sinking. A group of 153 survivors stay, making the first English settlement of the island.
  - After a fight on November 30 in Portuguese Macau between Japanese traders and Portuguese soldiers, Japan's ruling shogun, Tokugawa Ieyasu, strictly prohibits further trade between Japan and Portugal.
- July 30 – At modern-day Crown Point, New York, Samuel de Champlain participates in a battle between the Huron and Iroquois, shooting and killing two Iroquois chiefs; this helps set the tone for French–Iroquois relations for the next 100 years.
- August 10 – The Spanish galleon San Francisco sinks in a storm off the coast of Japan, with the loss of 56 men. Clinging to floating wreckage, the survivors are able to reach Yubanda, near Onjuku in modern-day Chiba Prefecture.
- August 11 – Four ships arrive at the colony of Jamestown, Virginia, with almost 300 men, women and children, to bring supplies for the starving English colonists. They are followed days later by the other three ships remaining from the London Company. Most of the supplies, however, are spoiled by rain and seawater, and many of the passengers are ill with the bubonic plague.
- August 15 (August 5 O.S.) – English astronomer Thomas Harriot becomes the first person to make a detailed drawing of the Moon, based on his observations through a telescope.
- August 25 – Galileo Galilei demonstrates his first telescope to Venetian officials.
- August 28 – Henry Hudson is the first European to see Delaware Bay.
- September 2 – Henry Hudson enters New York Bay, aboard the Halve Maen.
- September 10 – Jamestown: Capt. George Percy replaces Captain John Smith as president of the Council, and Smith returns to England.
- September 11
  - Expulsion of the Moriscos from Valencia in accordance with the edict signed by Philip III on April 4.
  - Henry Hudson in the Halve Maen sails into Upper New York Bay, and begins a journey up the Hudson River.

=== October–December ===
- October 12 – A version of the rhyme Three Blind Mice is published in London. The editor, and possible author of the verse, is the teenage Thomas Ravenscroft.
- November 19 – Archduke Matthias of Austria is formally crowned in Budapest as Mátyás II, King of Hungary, after having been appointed on June 26, 1608.
- November 29 – In Japan, a treaty is signed between Spanish nobleman Rodrigo de Vivero, former Governor-General of the Philippines and the former shogun Tokugawa Ieyasu, for the establishment of a Spanish factory in eastern Japan.
- December 8 – One of the first public libraries, the Biblioteca Ambrosiana, is opened in the Italian city of Milan, founded by Cardinal Federico Borromeo. Unlike other reading rooms, the library houses its collection on shelves along the walls, rather than chained to reading tables.

=== Date unknown ===
- The Dutch East India Company imports tea to Europe.
- The Dutch East India Company establishes a trading post in Hirado, Japan.
- Dutch entrepreneur Isaac Le Maire devizes the concept of selling short shares in order to benefit from a falling Dutch East India Company share price.
- Hugo Grotius publishes Mare Liberum, his legal text on freedom of the seas, in Leiden.
- The Scrooby Congregation of Protestant English Separatists (predecessors of the Pilgrim Fathers) moves from Amsterdam to Leiden.
- Warsaw becomes the capital of Poland.
- The municipality of Buenavista in Marinduque, Philippines is founded.
- The Statutes of Iona are passed, marking the end of the bloody feuds between the clans in the Scottish Highlands.
- The Douay–Rheims Bible Old Testament translation from the Vulgate into English vol. 1 is published in Reims.
- English-born Sister Mary Ward founds the Sisters of Loreto at Saint-Omer, at this time in the Spanish Netherlands.
- Johannes Kepler publishes his first two laws of planetary motion in Astronomia nova.
- Cornelis Drebbel invents the thermostat.
- "Egyptians" (i.e., Romany people) are expelled from the Kingdom of Scotland.

== Births ==
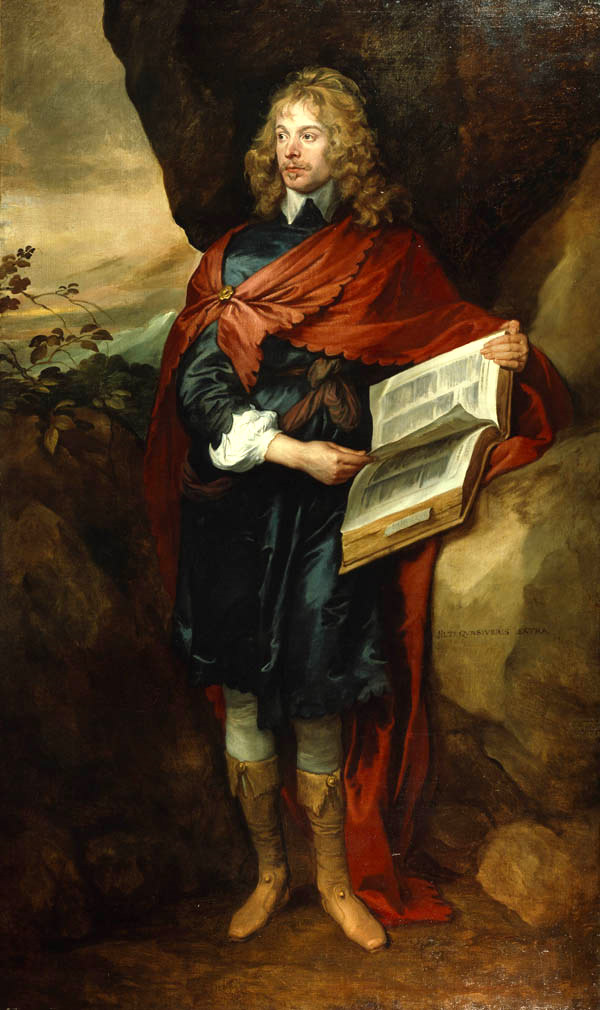
John Suckling

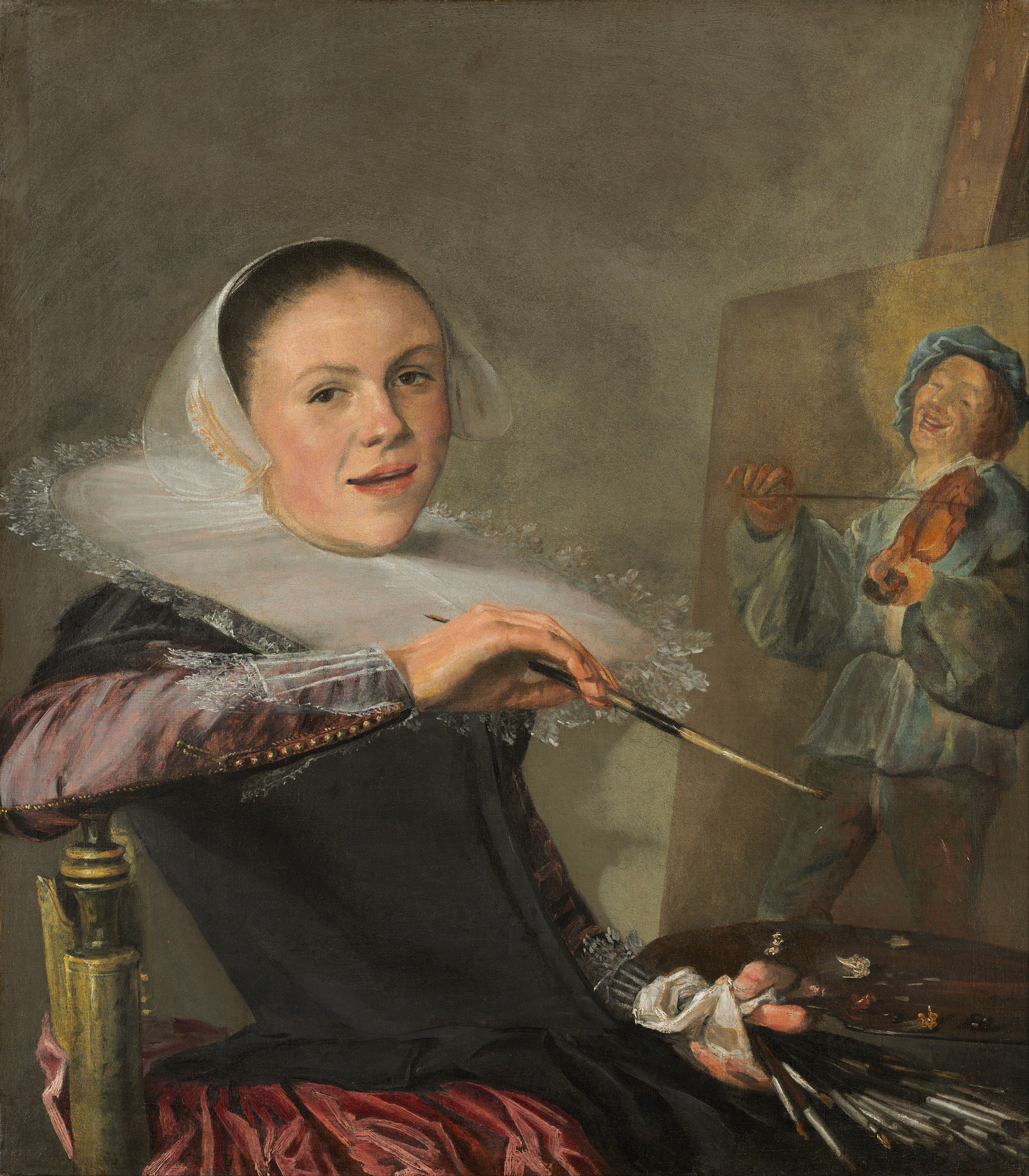
Judith Leyster

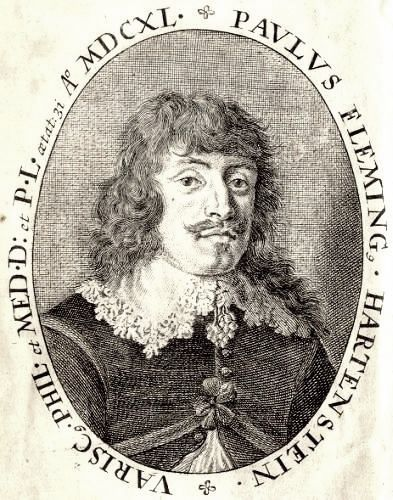
Paul Fleming

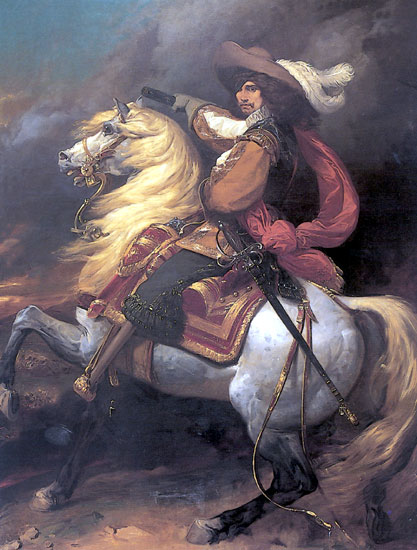
Josias von Rantzau

=== January–March ===
- January 18
  - Ferdinando Hastings, 6th Earl of Huntingdon, English politician (d. 1656)
  - Henry Oxenden, English poet (d. 1670)
- January 20 – Carlo Ceresa, Italian painter (d. 1679)
- January 30 – Václav Eusebius František, Prince of Lobkowicz, Austrian field marshal and prince (d. 1677)
- February 10
  - Lancelot Lake, Member of the English Parliament of (d. 1680)
  - John Suckling, English poet (d. 1642)
- February 14 – Bartram de Fouchier, Dutch painter (d. 1673)
- February 18 – Edward Hyde, 1st Earl of Clarendon, English statesman and historian (d. 1674)
- February 21 – Raimondo Montecuccoli, Italian general (d. 1680)
- March 16
  - Michael Franck, German composer and poet (d. 1667)
  - Agostino Mitelli, Italian painter (d. 1660)
- March 18 – King Frederick III of Denmark (d. 1670)
- March 22 – John II Casimir of Poland (d. 1672)
- March 23 – Johann Heinrich Schönfeld, German artist (d. 1684)
- March 25 – Paul Fréart de Chantelou, French collector and patron of the arts (d. 1694)

=== April–June ===
- April 6 – Walter Aston, 2nd Lord Aston of Forfar, second and eldest surviving son of Walter Aston (d. 1678)
- April 15 – Richard Winwood, English politician (d. 1688)
- May 6 – Antonie Waterloo, Flemish painter (d. 1690)
- May 10 – Mauritia Eleonora of Portugal, Princess of Portugal and through marriage countess of Nassau-Siegen (d. 1674)
- June 2 – Zsófia Bosnyák, Hungarian noblewoman (d. 1644)
- June 17 – John of Hesse-Braubach, German general (d. 1651)
- June 29 – Pierre-Paul Riquet, French engineer and canal builder (d. 1680)

=== July–September ===
- July 17 – Wilhelm Gumppenberg, German Jesuit theologian (d. 1675)
- July 28 – Judith Leyster, Dutch painter (d. 1660)
- July 29 – Maria Gonzaga, Duchess of Montferrat, Italian noble (d. 1660)
- August 6 – Richard Bennett, British Colonial Governor of Virginia (d. 1675)
- August 21 – Jean Rotrou, French poet and tragedian (d. 1650)
- August 25 – Giovanni Battista Salvi da Sassoferrato (d. 1685)
- August 30
  - Sir Alexander Carew, 2nd Baronet, English politician (d. 1644)
  - Artus Quellinus the Elder, Flemish sculptor (d. 1668)
- September 3 – Raymond Breton, French missionary (d. 1679)
- September 19 (or 1605) – Thomas Gouge, English minister (d. 1681)

=== October–December ===
- October 5 – Paul Fleming, German physician and poet (d. 1640)
- October 8 – John Clarke, English physician (d. 1676)
- October 9 – Thomas Weston, 4th Earl of Portland, younger son of the Richard Weston (d. 1688)
- October 14 – Ernest Günther, Duke of Schleswig-Holstein-Sonderburg-Augustenburg, Duke of Schleswig-Holstein of its Sonderborg line (d. 1689)
- October 16 – Thomas Minors, English politician and merchant (d. 1677)
- October 18 – Josias von Rantzau, Marshal of France (d. 1650)
- October 19 – Gerrard Winstanley, English Protestant religious reformer (d. 1676)
- October 26 – William Sprague, English co-founder of Charlestown, Massachusetts (d. 1675)
- October 29 – Wadham Wyndham, English judge (d. 1668)
- November 1 – Matthew Hale, Lord Chief Justice of England (d. 1676)
- November 23 – Sophia Eleonore of Saxony, German duchess (d. 1671)
- November 25 – Henrietta Maria of France, queen of England, Scotland and Ireland (d. 1669)
- November 26 – Henry Dunster, first President of Harvard College (d. 1659)
- December 6 – Nicholas Francis, Duke of Lorraine (d. 1670)
- December 11 – Alexander Cooper, English Baroque miniature painter (d. 1660)
- December 13 – Isbrand van Diemerbroeck, Dutch physician (d. 1674)
- December 24 – Philip Warwick, English writer and politician (d. 1683)
- December 30 – Anna Maria von Eggenberg, née Brandenburg-Bayreuth, Austrian noble (d. 1680)

=== Date unknown ===
- Luc d'Achery, French Benedictine (d. 1685)
- Samuel Cooper, English miniature painter (d. 1672)
- Alberich Mazak, Austrian composer (d. 1661)
- Elizabeth Isham, English diarist (d. 1654)
- Hannibal Sehested, Danish statesman (d. 1666)
- Thomas Greene, Colonial governor of Maryland (d. 1651)

=== Probable ===
Gauthier de Costes, seigneur de la Calprenède, French novelist and dramatist (d. 1663)

== Deaths ==
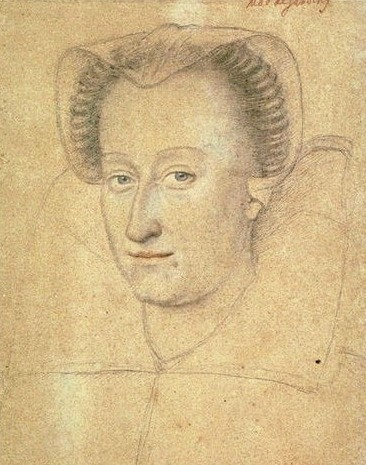
Isabelle de Limeuil

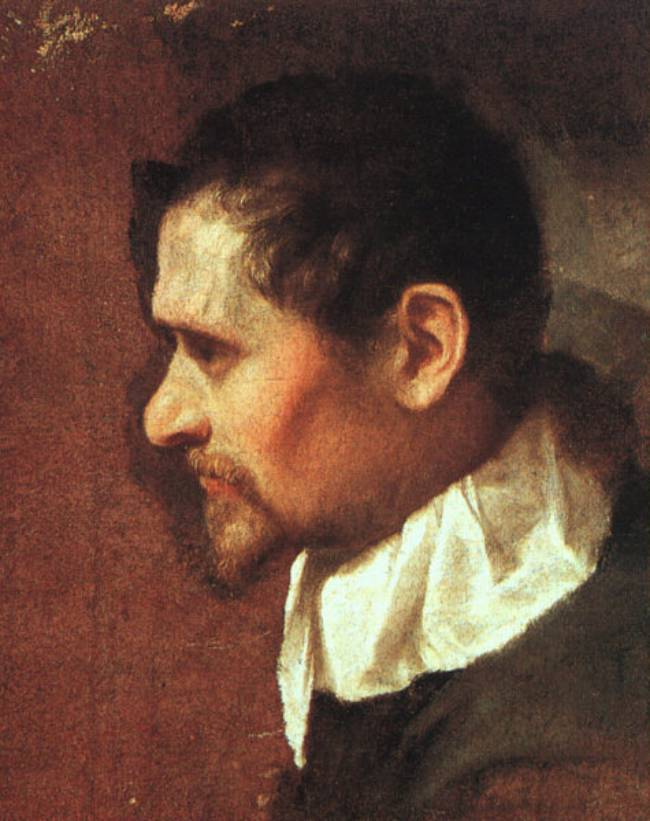
Annibale Carracci

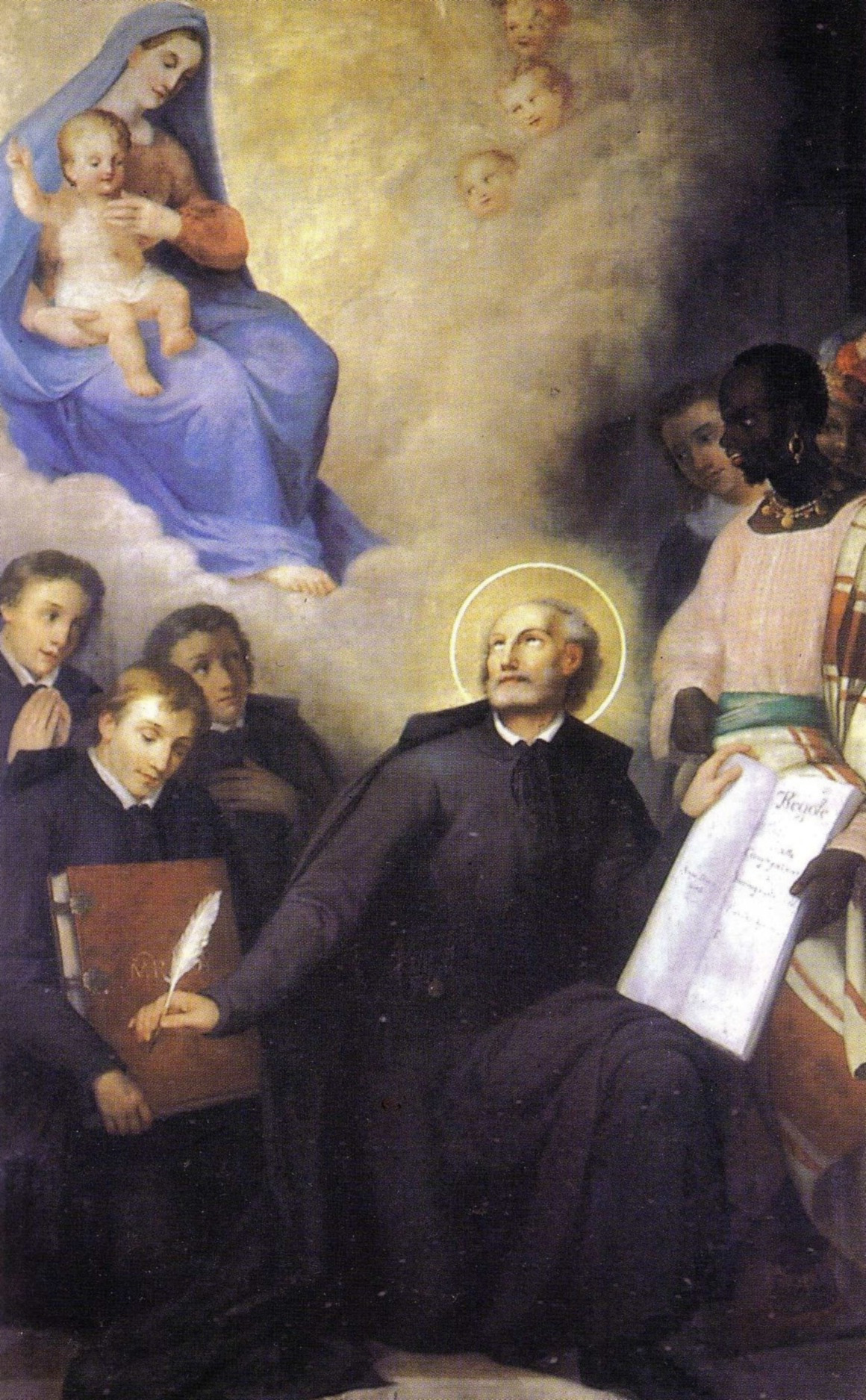
John Leonardi

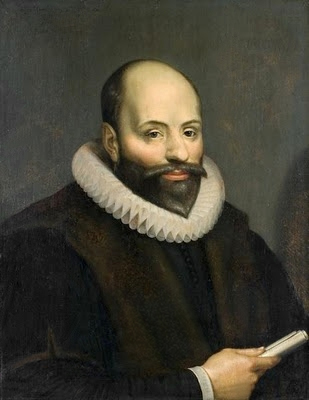
Jacobus Arminius

=== January–March ===
- January – Thomas East, English printer (born c. 1540)
- January 9 – Joannes Bochius, civic officeholder and neo-Latin poet in the city of Antwerp (b. 1555)
- January 21 – Joseph Justus Scaliger, French Protestant scholar (b. 1540)
- February 17 – Ferdinando I de' Medici, Grand Duke of Tuscany (b. 1549)
- February 28 – Paul Sartorius, German composer (b. 1569)
- March – James Hamilton, 3rd Earl of Arran (b. c. 1537)
- March 9 – William Warner, English poet (b. c. 1558)
- March 17 – Olaus Martini, Swedish Archbishop of Uppsala (b. 1557)
- March 22 – Al-Jilani, Persian physician
- March 25
  - Isabelle de Limeuil, French noble (b. 1535)
  - John William, Duke of Jülich-Cleves-Berg (b. 1562)

=== April–June ===
- April 4 – Charles de L'Ecluse, Flemish botanist (b. 1526)
- April 6 – Merkelis Giedraitis, Lithuanian bishop (b. 1536)
- April 8 – Mark Kerr, 1st Earl of Lothian, Scottish statesman (b. 1553)
- April 9 – William Overton, English bishop (b. 1525)
- April 11 – John Lumley, 1st Baron Lumley, English Baron (b. 1533)
- April 14 – Gasparo da Salò (Gasparo Bertolotti), Italian violin maker(b. 1540)
- May 15 – Giovanni Croce, Italian composer (b. 1557)
- May 19
  - Jacob Lorhard, German philosopher (b. 1561)
  - García Hurtado de Mendoza, 5th Marquis of Cañete (b. 1535)
- June 15 – Yamada Arinobu, Japanese nobleman (b. 1544)

=== July–September ===
- July 15 – Annibale Carracci, Italian Baroque painter (b. 1560)
- July 20 – Federico Zuccari, Italian painter (b. 1543)
- August 4 – Cecily Bulstrode, English courtier (b. 1584)
- August 7 – Eustache Du Caurroy, French composer (b. 1549)
- August 6 – André du Laurens, French physician (b. 1558)
- August 28 – Francis Vere, English soldier (b. c. 1560)
- September 2 – Thomas Scrope, 10th Baron Scrope of Bolton, English general (b. 1567)
- September 3 – Jean Richardot, Belgian diplomat (b. 1540)
- September 17 – Maharal of Prague, Jewish mystic and philosopher (b. 1525)
- September 29 – Ebba Lilliehöök, Swedish countess (b. 1529)

=== October–December ===
- October 1 – Giammateo Asola, Italian composer (b. c. 1532)
- October 9 – John Leonardi, Italian founder of the Clerks Regular of the Mother of God of Lucca (b. 1541)
- October 16 – Dorothea Hedwig of Brunswick-Wolfenbüttel, Princess of Anhalt-Zerbst (b. 1587)
- October 19 – Jacobus Arminius, Dutch Reformed theologian (b. 1560)
- December – Barnabe Barnes, English poet (b. c. 1571)
- December 4 – Alexander Hume, Scottish poet (b. 1560)
- December 16 – Arild Huitfeldt, Danish historian (b. 1546)
