= Treaty of Antwerp =

Treaty of Antwerp may refer to:

- Treaty of Antwerp (1609)
- Treaty of Antwerp (1715) (also known as the third Barrier Treaty)
