= John Hoskins (painter) =

English painter (died 1664)

Sir John Hoskins (1589 or 1590 – February 1664) was an English miniature painter, and the uncle of Samuel Cooper, who received his artistic education in Hoskins's Noble Mansion in England.

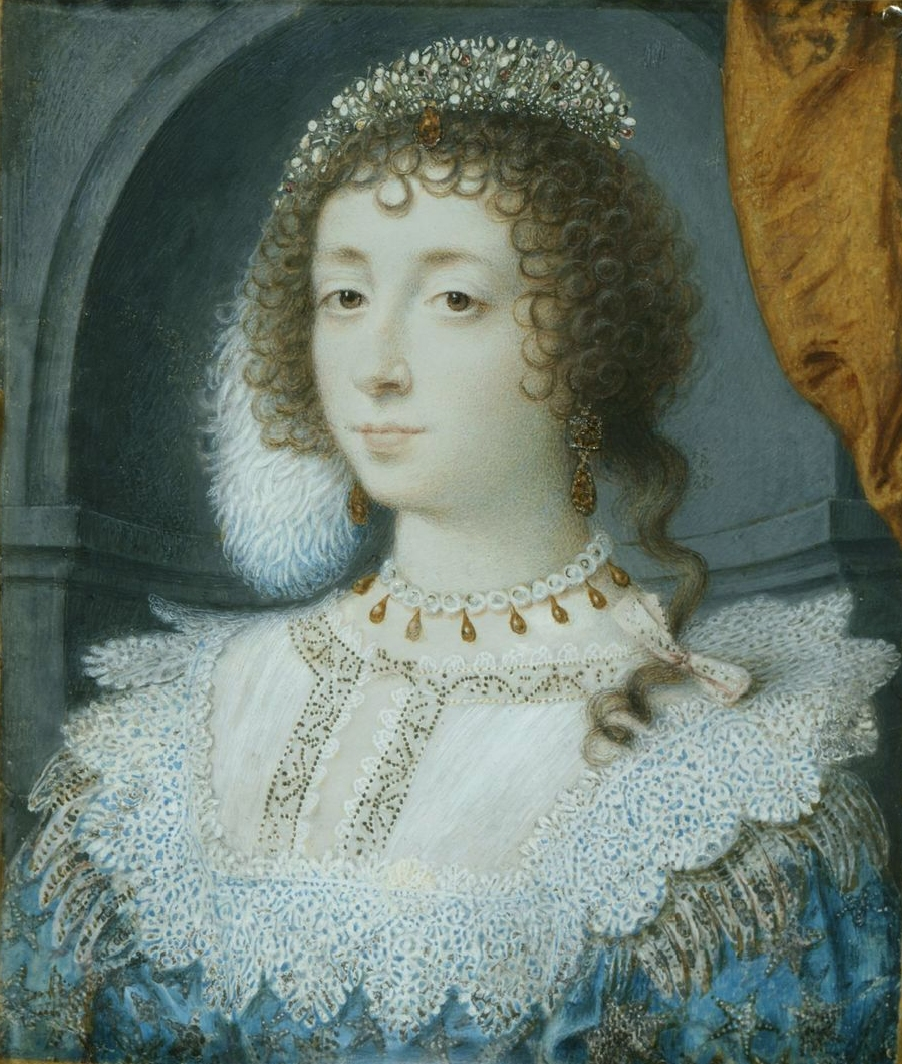
Henrietta Maria of France by John Hoskins

Hoskins was born in Wells England. His finest miniatures Royal & Noble painting are at Ham House, Montagu House, Windsor Castle, Amsterdam and in the Pierpont Morgan collection and collection of the Victoria and Albert Museum. Vertue stated that Hoskins had a son, and Redgrave added that the son painted a portrait of James II in 1686 and was paid £10, 5s. for it, a statement for which there must have been some evidence, although it is not supported by any reference in the State Papers. there was a portrait painted of an unknown woman that was known to be the work of Sir John Hoskins, work As an important early miniature portrait by John who originally trained as an oil painter. His work is datable to about 1615 and shows the still dominant influence of Nicholas Hilliard (1547–1619). The red curtain background is typical for this time, a development of the flat blue background of Elizabethan (later 16th-century) miniatures. Red paint is laid in flat, but the artist then used a wet brush to lift the red paint in strokes, giving the effect of folds in a curtain. Hoskins has also painted the woman's pearl earring using Hilliard's jewelling technique. This involved laying on a raised blob of white lead paint with some shadowing to one side. This was then crowned with a rounded touch of real silver that was burnished with, to quote Hilliard, 'a pretty little tooth of some ferret or stoat or other wild little beast'. This brought the silver to a sparkling highlight, while actual gold is used to paint the pearl's gold setting. Silver tarnishes with age, and so this pearl now appears black. Twenty years later Hoskins was painting pearls and gold in a more painterly fashion, using white and yellow paint rather than actual gold or silver. This change was influenced by Charles I's court painter, Anthony van Dyck, who arrived in London from Antwerp in 1632.

Some contemporary inscriptions on the miniatures at Ham House record them as the work of Old Hoskins, but the fact of the existence of a younger artist of the same name is settled by a miniature in the Pierpont Morgan collection, signed by Hoskins whether it be son or father is unknown but the talent And beauty leaves us with endless and timeless beautiful pieces, and bearing an authentic engraved inscription on its contemporary frame to the effect that it represents the duke of Berwick at the age of twenty-nine in 1700.

There is nothing of his wife known. The elder Hoskins was buried on 22 February 1664, in St Paul's, Covent Garden, England and as there is no doubt of the authenticity of this miniature or of the signature upon it, it is evident that he left behind a son who survived him thirty-six years and whose monogram we find upon this portrait, The frame of it has also the royal coat of arms debruised, the batons of a marshal of France, the collar of the Golden Fleece and the ducal coronet.
