= Festival book =

Type of book

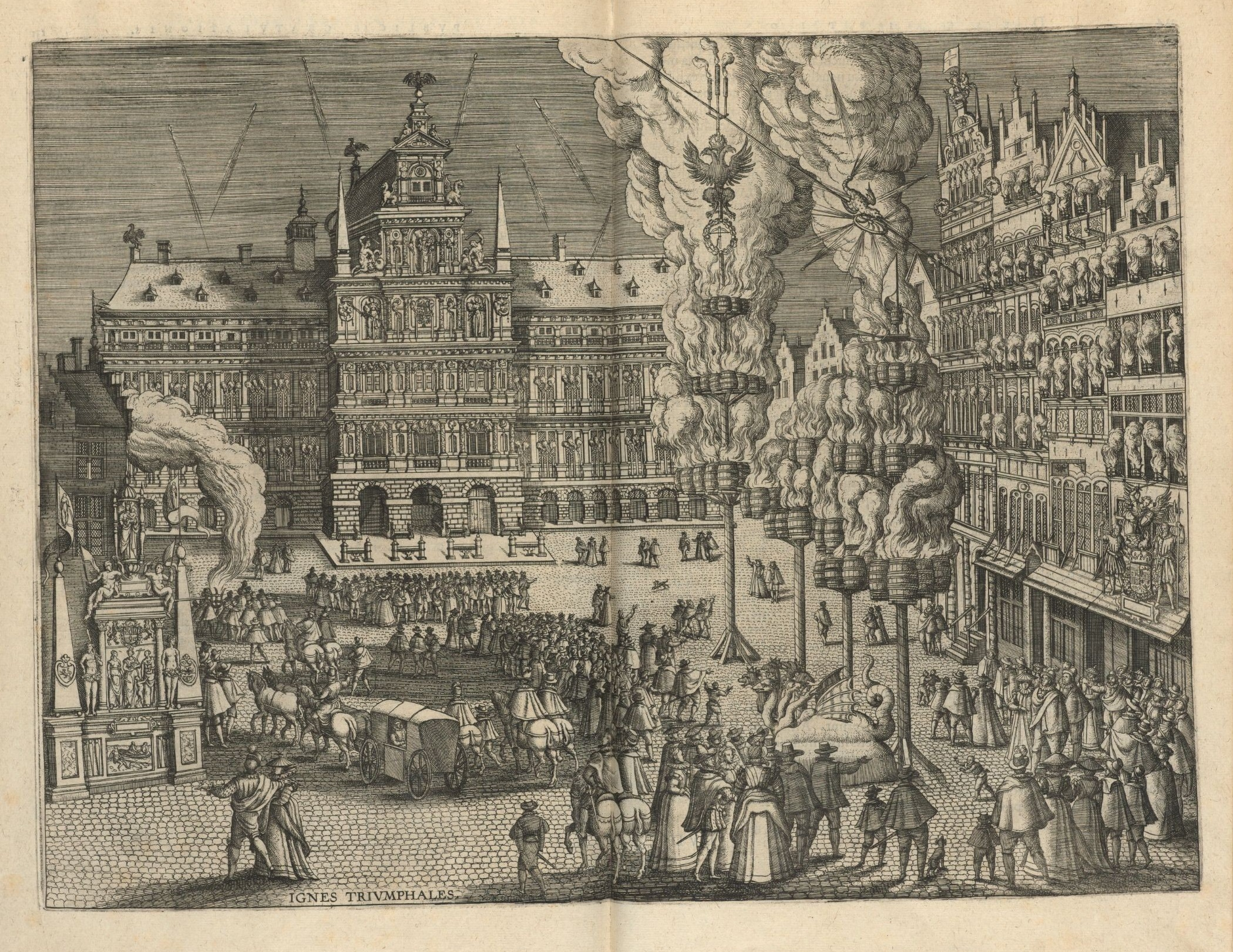
Illustration from festival book Descriptio Publicae Gratulationis by Joannes Bochius, commemorating 1594 entry into Antwerp of Archduke Ernest of Austria

Festival books (Dutch: feestboeken, Spanish: libros de festivos) are books, often illustrated, that commemorate a notable event such as a royal entry, coronation or wedding. Funerals were also commemorated in similar fashion. The genre thrived in Renaissance and early modern Europe, where rulers utilized the form to both document and embellish displays of wealth and power.

== Description ==
Large numbers were produced, often surviving in very few copies; the largest collection, in the British Library, has over 2000 examples. Originally manuscripts, often illustrated, compiled for prince or city, with the arrival of print they were frequently published, varying in form from short pamphlets describing the order of events, and perhaps recording speeches, to lavish books illustrated with woodcuts or engravings showing the various tableaux, often including a fold-out panorama of the procession, curling to and fro across the page. The pamphlets were ephemera; a printed description of two leaves describing the entry of Ferdinand II of Aragon into Valladolid, 1513, survives in a single copy (at Harvard) because it was bound with another text. A lost description of the ceremonious reception given by Louis XII to Ferdinand at Savona (June 1507) is only known from a purchase receipt of Ferdinand Columbus.

These livrets are not always to be trusted as literal records; some were compiled beforehand from the plans, and others after the event from fading memories. The authors or artists engaged in producing the books had by no means always seen the entry themselves. Roy Strong finds that they are "an idealization of an event, often quite distant from its reality as experienced by the average onlooker. One of the objects of such publications was to reinforce by means of word and image the central ideas that motivated those who conceived the programme." Philip II of Spain's ceremonial entry into Antwerp in 1549 was all but called off because of torrential rain, but the book shows it as it should have been. Thomas Dekker, the playwright and author of the book on The Magnificent Entertainment for James I of England is refreshingly frank:

Reader, you must understand, that a regard, being had that his Majestie should not be wearied with teadious speeches; A great part of those which are in this Booke set downe, were left unspoken; So that thou doest here receive them as they should have been delivered, not as they were.

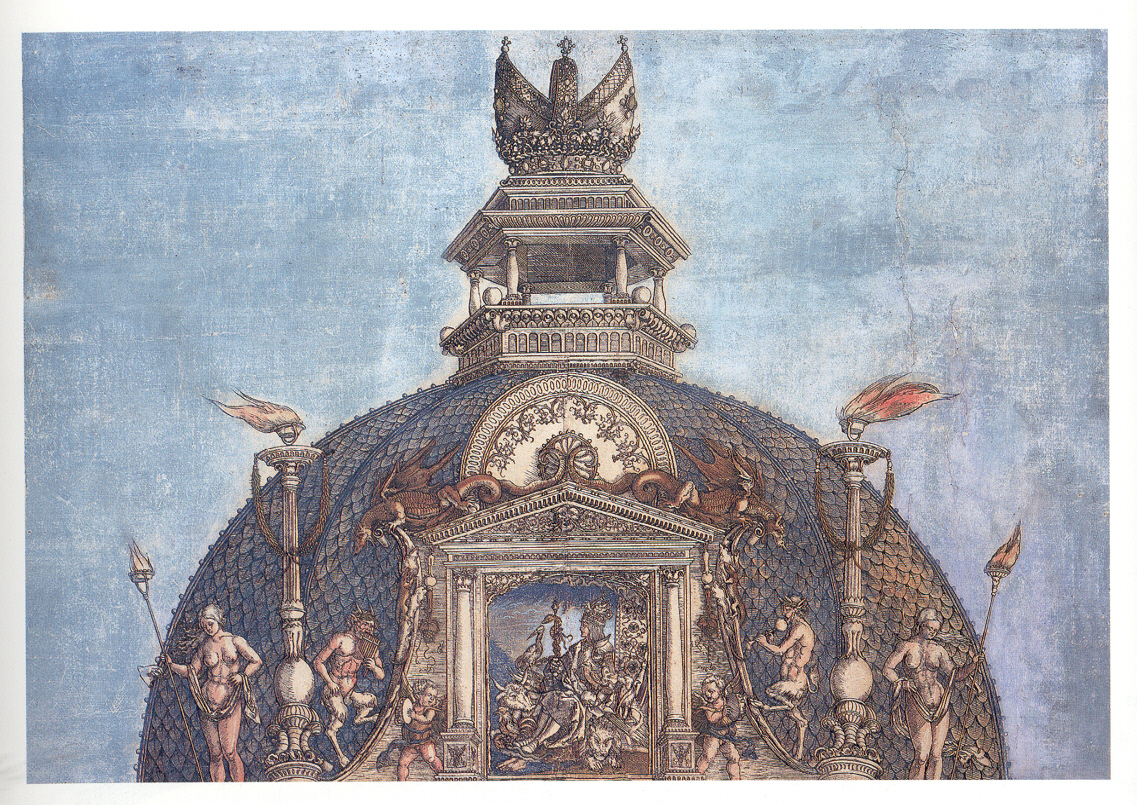
Detail of top (about 1/10 of the height) of the Triumphal Arch of Maximilian, coloured woodcut, overall design by Albrecht Dürer.

The Holy Roman Emperor, Maximilian I, went a step further, creating enormous virtual triumphs that existed solely in the form of print. The Triumphs of Maximilian (begun in 1512 and unfinished at Maximilian's death in 1519) contains over 130 large woodcuts by Albrecht Dürer and other artists, showing a huge procession (still in open country) culminating in the Emperor himself, mounted on a huge triumphal car. The Triumphal Arch (1515), the largest print ever made, at 3.57 x 2.95 metres when the 192 sheets are assembled, was produced in an edition of seven hundred copies for distribution to friendly cities and princes. It was intended to be hand-coloured and then pasted to a wall. Traditional tableau themes, including a large genealogy, and many figures of Virtues, are complemented by scenes of Maximilian's life and military victories. Maximilian was wary of entries in person, having been locked up by his loyal subjects in Bruges in 1488 for eleven weeks, until he could pay the bills from his stay.

An early meeting between the festival book with travel literature is the account of the visit in 1530 of the future Ferdinand I, Holy Roman Emperor, then King of Hungary and Bohemia, to Constantinople.

== Examples ==
- C'est la deduction du sumpteux order plaisantz spectacles et magnifiques theatres dresses, about entry into Rouen of Henri II and Catherine de' Medici, 1550
- Feste nelle nozze del serenissimo Don Francesco Medici Gran Duca di Toscana, commemorating marriage of Francesco I de' Medici, Grand Duke of Tuscany to Bianca Cappello, 1578.
- Descrizione delle feste fatte in Firenze, commemorating wedding of Ferdinando II de' Medici, Grand Duke of Tuscany, 1630s. Festivities included horse ballet.
- Pompa Introitus Ferdinandi Austriaci Hispaniarum Infantis in Urbem Antwerpen, describing Cardinal-Infante Ferdinand of Austria's entry into Antwerp, 1635; illustrated by Peter Paul Rubens.
- Pompa funeral honras y exequias en la muerte dela muy alta y Catolica Señora Doña Isabel, on occasion of 1644 funeral of queen Isabel de Borbon of Spain
- Courses de testes et de bague, on occasion of 1662 tournament in Paris, with engravings by Israel Silvestre and François Chauveau
- Relation de la feste de Versailles, regarding Louis XIV's party in 1668 for Peace of Aix-la-Chapelle, with premiere of Molière's George Dandin
- Narrazione delle solenni reali feste, events in Naples for 1747 birth of Infante Philip
- Sacre et Couronnement de Louis XVI, commemorating coronation of Louis XVI, 1775
- A True Representation of the Triumphal car, pulled by four horses, which conveyed Sir Francis Burdett to the Crown and Anchor Tavern, Strand, 29 June 1807 (after his election as MP for Westminster).

== See also ==
- Propaganda
