= Joannes Bochius =

- Jan Boghe
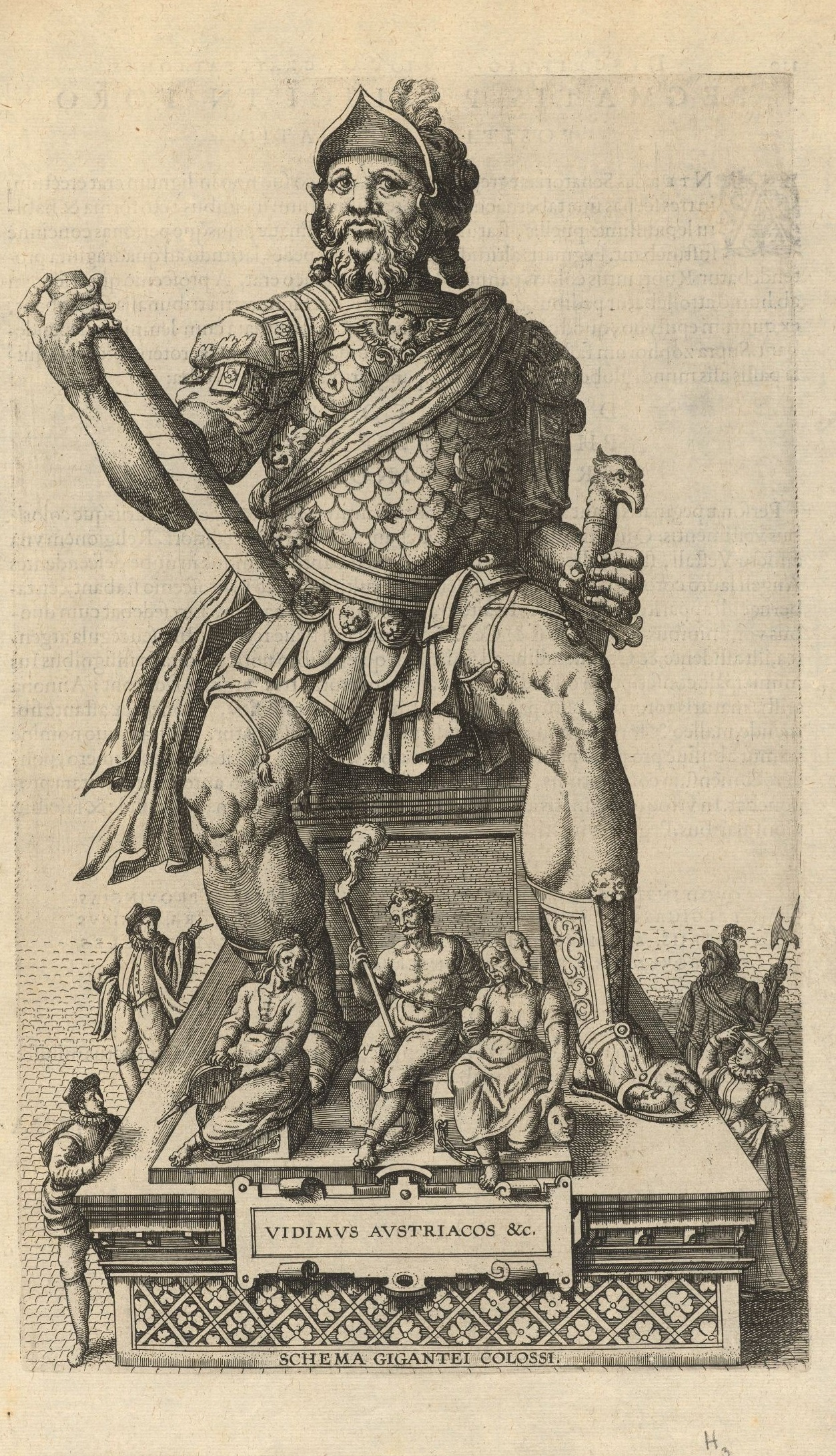
- An illustration from Bochius's Descriptio publicae gratulationis (1595), engraved by Pieter van der Borcht the Elder
- Born: 1 July 1555; Brussels
- Died: 9 January 1609 (aged 53); Antwerp
- Resting place: Cathedral of Our Lady (Antwerp)
- Education: law
- Alma mater: Leuven University
- Occupation: secretary to the city of Antwerp
- Children: Joannes-Ascanius
- Writing career
- Pen name: I.B.
- Language: Neo-Latin
- Period: 1587–1609
- Genres: festival book, psalm paraphrase, panegyric, epigram
- Notable works: Descriptio publicae gratulationis (1595), Historica narratio profectionis et inaugurationis (1602)
- Movement: Northern Humanism

Joannes Bochius, sometimes Jan Boghe or Jean Boch (1555–1609) was a civic officeholder and Neo-Latin poet in the city of Antwerp.

== Life ==
Born in Brussels in 1555, Bochius studied law at Leuven University and then travelled to Rome, where he served in the household of the later Cardinal Radzivil and studied under Robert Bellarmine. After leaving Rome he made a tour of northern Europe, almost losing his feet to frostbite in Moscow and being attacked and left for dead by brigands in Lithuania. After the Fall of Antwerp he was appointed secretary to the city, holding the office until his death in 1609.

== Works ==
Bochius wrote Latin celebrations of the restoration of Habsburg authority in Antwerp by Alexander Farnese, Duke of Parma and of the career of Christopher Plantin. As secretary to the city, he compiled the festival books recording the Joyous Entry into Antwerp of Archduke Ernest of Austria in 1594 (published 1595) and of the sovereign Archdukes Albert and Isabella in 1599 (published 1602). He also produced numerous commendatory verses and epigrams for books by other authors and for prints (collected and published in Cologne after his death) and verse paraphrases of the Psalms of David (partially published posthumously).

Those of his letters preserved in the Antwerp city archive were published by Pieter Génard in the Antwerpsch archievenblad (vols. 16-17; 1890-1891).

== Bibliography ==
- Panegyrici in Antverpiam sibi et regi obsidione restitutam (Antwerp, Christopher Plantin, 1587).
- Epigrammata funebria ad Christophori Plantini architypographi regij manes (Antwerp, Jan Moretus, 1590).
- Descriptio publicae gratulationis, spectaculorum et ludorum, in adventu Sereniss. Principis Ernesti (Antwerp, Jan Moretus, 1595).
  - Reprinted as Hans Mielke (ed.), The Ceremonial Entry of Ernst, Archduke of Austria, into Antwerp, June 14, 1594 (New York, 1970).
- Historica narratio profectionis et inaugurationis Serenissimorum Belgii Principum Alberti et Isabellae (Antwerp, Jan Moretus, 1602). Available on Google Books.
- Psalmorum Davidis parodia heroica (Antwerp, Jan Moretus, 1608-1609).
- Panegyrici, epigrammata & poemata varia, collected by Franciscus Sweertius (Cologne, Joannes Kinckius, 1614).
