= Wilhelm Gumppenberg =

German religious servant and theologian

Wilhelm Gumppenberg (17 July 1609, Munich – 8 May 1675, Innsbruck) was a Bavarian Jesuit and theologian. He is primarily known for his Atlas Marianus, a work devoted to miracle-working images of the Virgin Mary.

== Biography ==
Wilhelm Gumppenberg was born in Munich on 17 July 1609 into the lower Bavarian nobility, he joined the Society of Jesus in 1625. He studied at Landsberg (1625–1633), then at Rome (1633–1640). Having completed his studies, Gumppenberg embarked on a career as preacher which took him successively to Ingolstadt (1640–1643), Regensburg (1643–1646), Fribourg in Switzerland (1646–1649), Freiburg im Brisgau (1649–1650), Trent (1650–-1656), Augsburg (1656–1658), Dillingen (1658–1660) and Innsbruck (1660–1662). He was then sent to Rome as confessor to German-speaking pilgrims to St. Peter’s (1662–1666). After his second stay in Rome, Gumppenberg returned to Bavaria. He died in Innsbruck on 8 May 1675.

== Works ==
Even though Wilhelm Gumppenberg is the author of a catalogue of Roman churches intended for pilgrims and of a collection of meditations on the life of Christ, his name is primarily associated with a catalogue of miracle-working images of the Virgin Mary, the Atlas Marianus, a work to which he devoted more than twenty years of his life.

=== Origins and development of the Atlas Marianus ===
In 1650, whilst a preacher in Trent, Wilhelm Gumppenberg informed his superiors in the Society of Jesus of his intention to put together a catalogue of those images of the Virgin Mary that had miraculous properties. The nature of this project connects it to the genre of sacred topography, that is, the enumeration and description of pilgrimage sites, relics and images reputed to have miraculous properties. However, the Atlas Marianus stands out on account of its geographical scope: whilst other works in this genre normally concentrate on a narrower geographical range (a city, a province or a country), Gumppenberg intended to offer the reader a global inventory listing all the miraculous images of the Virgin in the entire world. This universalist ambition led Gumppenberg to seek the help of the Society of Jesus: in 1655, he published the Idea Atlantis Mariani, which is both a description of the planned undertaking and an appeal for support. 600 copies of this were sent out to the rectors of Jesuit colleges. Although the response to this initiative varied greatly according to region, Wilhelm Gumppenberg gradually built up a network of individuals contributing information; by the end of the 1660s, more than 270 people were involved. The scale of the task and practical difficulties nevertheless induced Gumppenberg to produce a preparatory version of his work in the first instance: published simultaneously in Latin and in German between 1657 and 1659, it lists and describes 100 miraculous images of the Virgin. The definitive version, listing 1200 items, appeared in Latin in 1672.

=== Nature and purpose of the Atlas Marianus ===
Following the conventions of the genre of sacred topography, both the long and the short version of the Atlas Marianus consists of a series of notices, providing for each image a more or less elaborate historical account of its first appearance, its miracles and the cult surrounding it. The apparent simplicity of the project and its repetitive quality should not, however, be allowed to obscure the fact that this is a complex work with several different objectives – and that the different versions are intended for very specific readerships. The Atlas Marianus is primarily a piece of anti-Protestant polemic, aiming to prove the legitimacy of the cult of images by giving multiple examples of the miracles effected through them. It is also a devotional text, offering theCatholicc faithful a full spectrum of mariological pilgrimages. This aspect is particularly prominent in the short version, which offers engravings of the miracle-working images alongside the relevant notices. These are more than simple illustrations; they are intended as devotional aids, allowing the reader to undertake in his or her mind a multitude of pilgrimages, which would have been impossible in real life. Published only in Latin, the long version, by contrast, was intended for a learned audience: theologians, preachers, and teachers. It is for their benefit that Gumppenberg devised a very elaborate index (running to almost 200 pages) which combined all sorts of criteria – locations and times of the discovery of the images, the identity of those who made the discoveries, the materials out of which the images were made, etc. – and which made the Atlas the tool of a proper science of the miraculous, intended to refute not only the Protestant detractors, but also the natural philosophers who tended to play down, or even to reject, the hypothesis of God’s direct intervention in life on earth.

=== Afterlife of the work ===
The scale of the catalogue, its geographical scope and the quality of its documentation are factors which help to explain the continued popularity of the Atlas Marianus. As well as being re-edited, the Atlas Marianus was subjected to several translations and adaptations: a translation of the long version was translated into German (1673), a translation/adaptation into Hungarian (1690) and into Czech (1704), an abridged edition of the long version in German (1717). A century and a half later, the Italian priest Agostino Zanella followed in the footsteps of Gumppenberg by publishing a new version of the Atlas in twelve volumes which added to the corpus a quantity of new images, primarily Italian. In France, the abbot Jean-Jacques Bourassé chose to include the first three hundred items of the long version into the mariological compilation that he published between 1862 and 1866. More recently, the short version of the Atlas Marianus has been published in a critical edition, with a French translation alongside the German original.

== Bibliography ==
=== Works by Wilhelm Gumppenberg ===
- Idea Atlantis Mariani de Imaginibus miraculosis B. V. Mariae, Trent, Carlo Zanetti, 1655.
- Atlas Marianus sive de Imaginibus Deiparae per Orbem Christianum Miraculosis, auctore Guilielmo Gumppenberg, 4 vols., 1657-1659 (vols. I and II published by Georg Haenlin in Ingolstadt and Lucas Straub in Munich, vols. III and IV published by Johann Ostermeyer in Ingolstadt).
- Marianischer Atlas : das ist wunderthätige Mariabilder so in aller christlichen Welt mit Wunderzaichen berhuembt durch Guilielmum Gumppenberg, 4 vols., 1657-1659 (vol. I and II published by Georg Haenlin in Ingolstadt, Lucas Straub in Munich and Johann Jaecklin, also in Munich, vols. III and IV published by Johann Jaecklin in Munich).
- Sedici pellegrinaggi per le 365 chiese di Roma, Rome, Egidio Ghezzi, 1665.
- Atlas Marianus, quo sanctae Dei genitricis Mariae imaginum miraculosarum origines duodecim historiarum centuriis explicantur, Munich, Johann Jaecklin, 1672.
- Iesus vir dolorum Mariae matris dolorosae filius, Munich, Hermann von Gelder, 1672.
- L'Atlas Marianus de Wilhelm Gumppenberg. Édition et traduction, ed. by Nicolas Balzamo, Olivier Christin and Fabrice Flückiger, Neuchâtel, Alphil / Presses universitaires suisses, 2015. Editor’s page

=== Works about Wilhelm Gumppenberg and the Atlas Marianus ===
- Olivier Christin, Fabrice Flückiger and Naïma Ghermani (eds.), Marie mondialisée. L'AtlasMarianus de Wilhelm Gumppenberg et les topographies sacrées de l'époque moderne, Neuchâtel, Alphil / Presses universitaires suisses, 2014. Editor’s page
- Friedrich Wilhelm Bautz, "Gumppenberg, Wilhelm", in Biographisch-bibliographisches Kirchenlexikon (BBKL), vol. 2, Hamm, Bautz,1990, col. 393-394.
- Edgar Krausen, "Gumppenberg, Wilhelm Freiherr von", in Neue Deutsche Bibliographie (NDB), vol. 7, Berlin, Duncker & Humblot, 1966, p. 311.

== Links ==
- Texts by Wilhelm Gumppenberg in the catalogue of German printed books of the 17th century (VD17).
