= Samuel Cooper (painter) =

17th-century English painter of miniatures

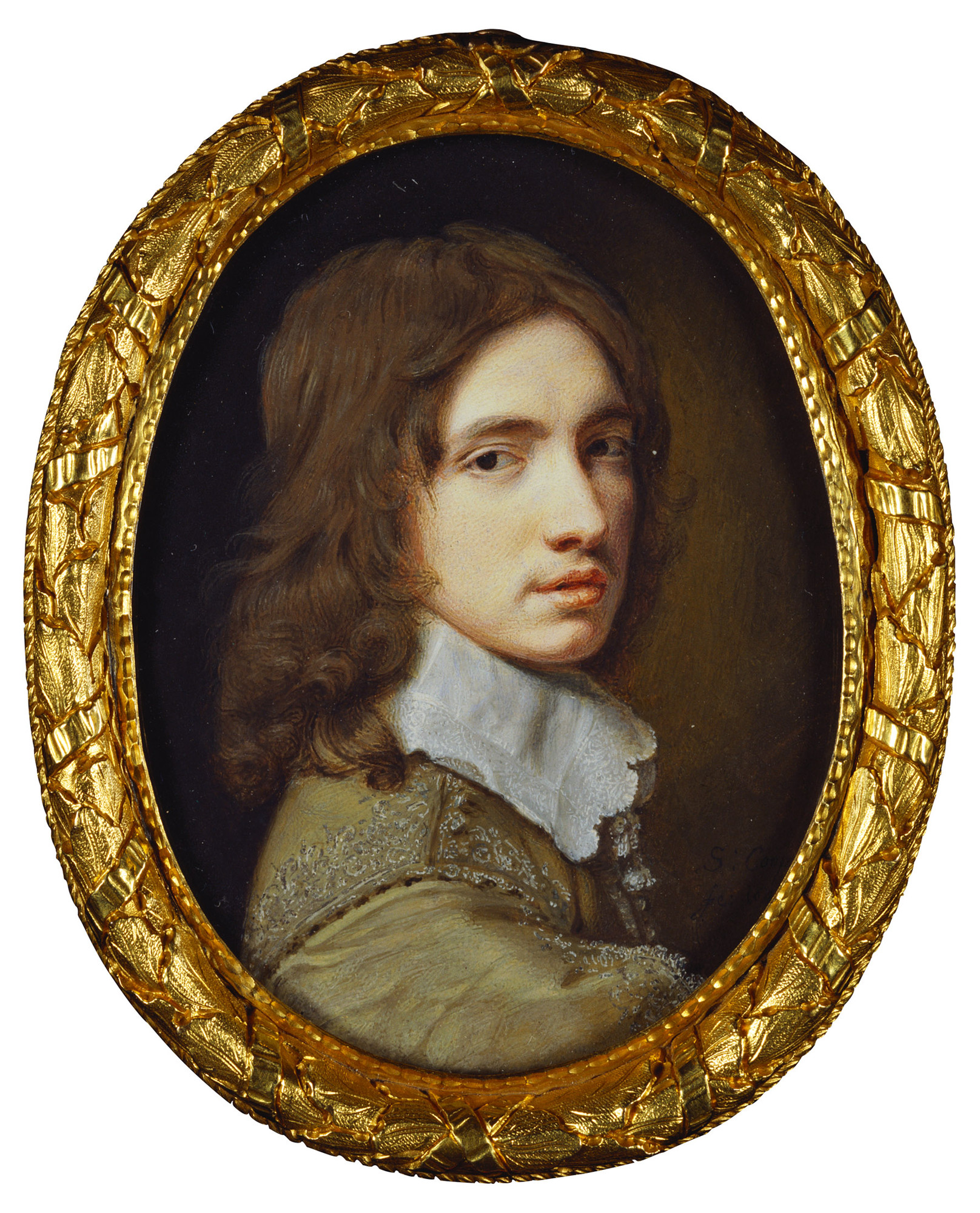
- self-portrait miniature, 1645
- Born: c. 1609
- Died: 5 May 1672; Covent Garden
- Occupation: Painter
- Spouse: Christina Cooper
- Relatives: Alexander Cooper

Samuel Cooper (1609 – 5 May 1672), sometimes spelt Samuel Cowper, was an English miniature painter. He was the younger brother of Alexander Cooper.

== Life ==
He is believed to have been born in London, and was a nephew of the painter John Hoskins, by whom he was educated. He lived in Henrietta Street, (Note: Henrietta Street, Covent Garden, is roughly parallel to and about halfway between Floral Street and the Strand, London.) Covent Garden, and frequented the Covent Garden Coffee-House. The writer Samuel Pepys, who made many references to Cooper, described him as an excellent musician, playing the lute well, and also a good linguist, speaking French with ease. According to other contemporary writers, he was a short, stout man, of a ruddy countenance. He married a woman named Christiana, whose portrait is at Welbeck Abbey in Nottinghamshire, and they had one daughter. Christiana's sister Edith was the mother of the poet Alexander Pope.

In 1668 he was commissioned by Pepys to paint a portrait of Pepys's wife, for which Cooper charged £30. He is known, from his correspondence with the naturalist John Ray, to have painted the portrait of John Aubrey, which was presented in 1691 to the Ashmolean Museum in Oxford. John Evelyn refers to him in 1662, when, on the occasion of the visit that Evelyn paid to King Charles II, Cooper was drawing the royal face and head for the new coinage.

Examples of his work can be found at Windsor Castle, Belvoir Castle, Montague House, Welbeck Abbey, Ham House, the Rijksmuseum in Amsterdam and in the collection of J.P. Morgan. His largest miniature is in the possession of the Duke of Richmond and Gordon at Goodwood House. An example of his handwriting can be seen at the back of one of his miniatures in the Welbeck Abbey collection, and one of his drawings in black chalk is in the University Gallery at the University of Oxford. His self-portrait is in Morgan's collection.

The date of his death has been handed down by a record in the diary of Mary Beale, the miniature painter; and in some letters from Charles Manners, addressed to Lord Roos, dated 1672, now amongst the Duke of Rutland's papers at Belvoir, the writer refers to Cooper's serious illness on 4 May 1672, and to his doubt as to whether Cooper would ever recover. Beale's reference to his decease is in the following words: "Sunday, May 5, 1672 Mr Samuel Cooper, the most famous limner of the world for a face, died."

He is buried in St Pancras Old Church in London. His baroque memorial lies on the far east wall of the church.

According to the art historian G.C. Williamson, "There is urgent demand for a memoir of Samuel Cooper. The details of his life are hardly known. ... The early part of his artistic career he spent in Paris and Holland, and it is very likely that careful research in the records of the Bibliothèque Nationale might reveal information respecting him which would be of the greatest interest."

== Gallery ==
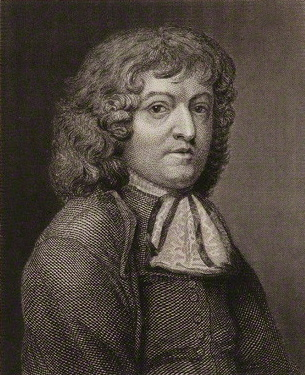
Samuel Cooper during the 1660s

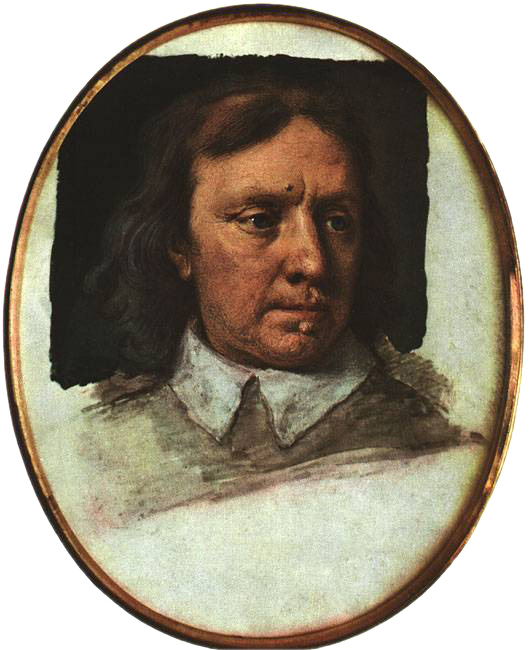
Unfinished portrait miniature of Oliver Cromwell, c. 1650

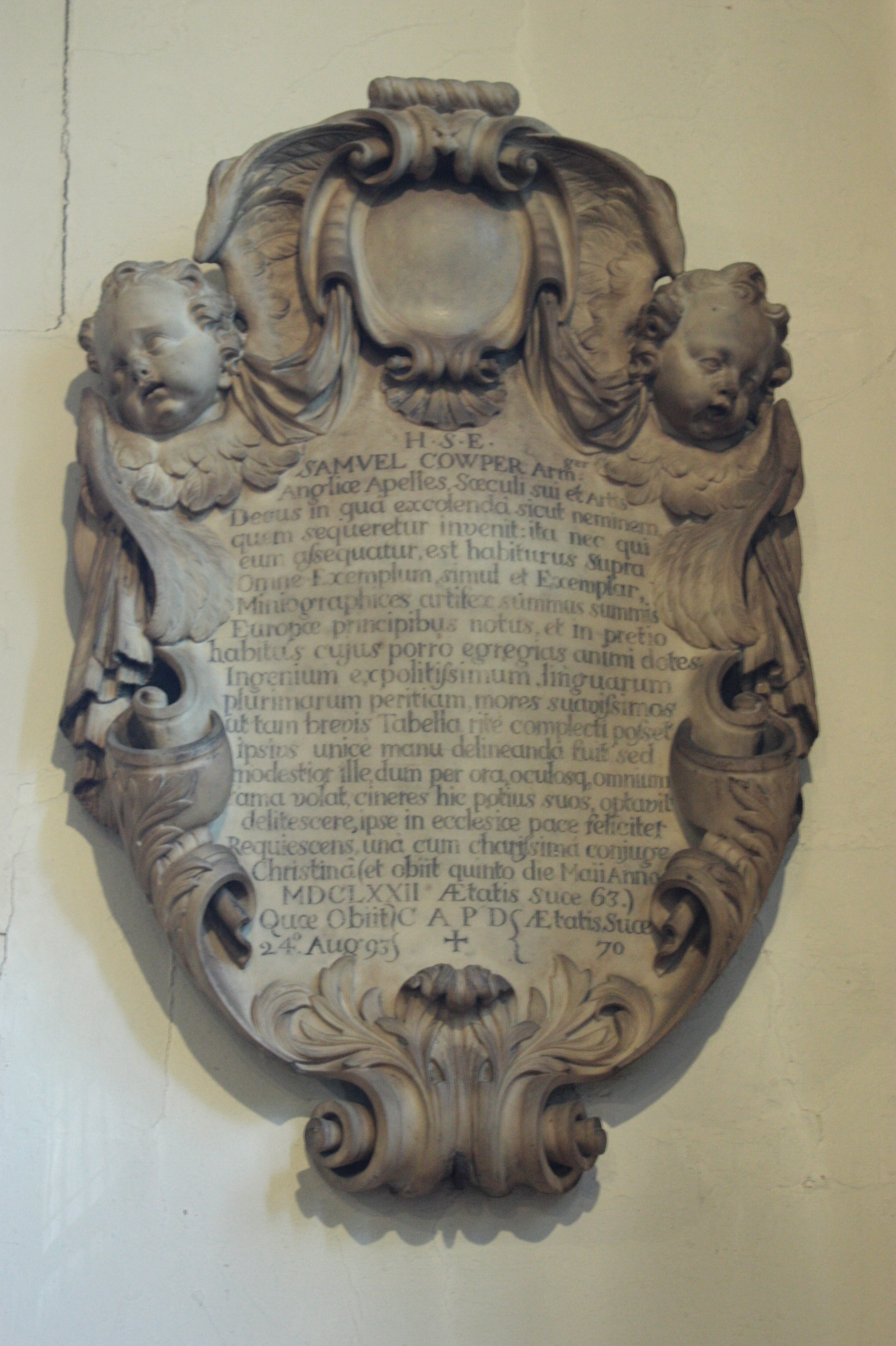
Cooper's grave at Old St Pancras Church in London

== Sources ==
- G. C. Williamson, History of Portrait Miniatures, Volume 1 (London: George Bell & Sons, 1904) p. 64.
