= Antonie Waterloo =

Dutch painter

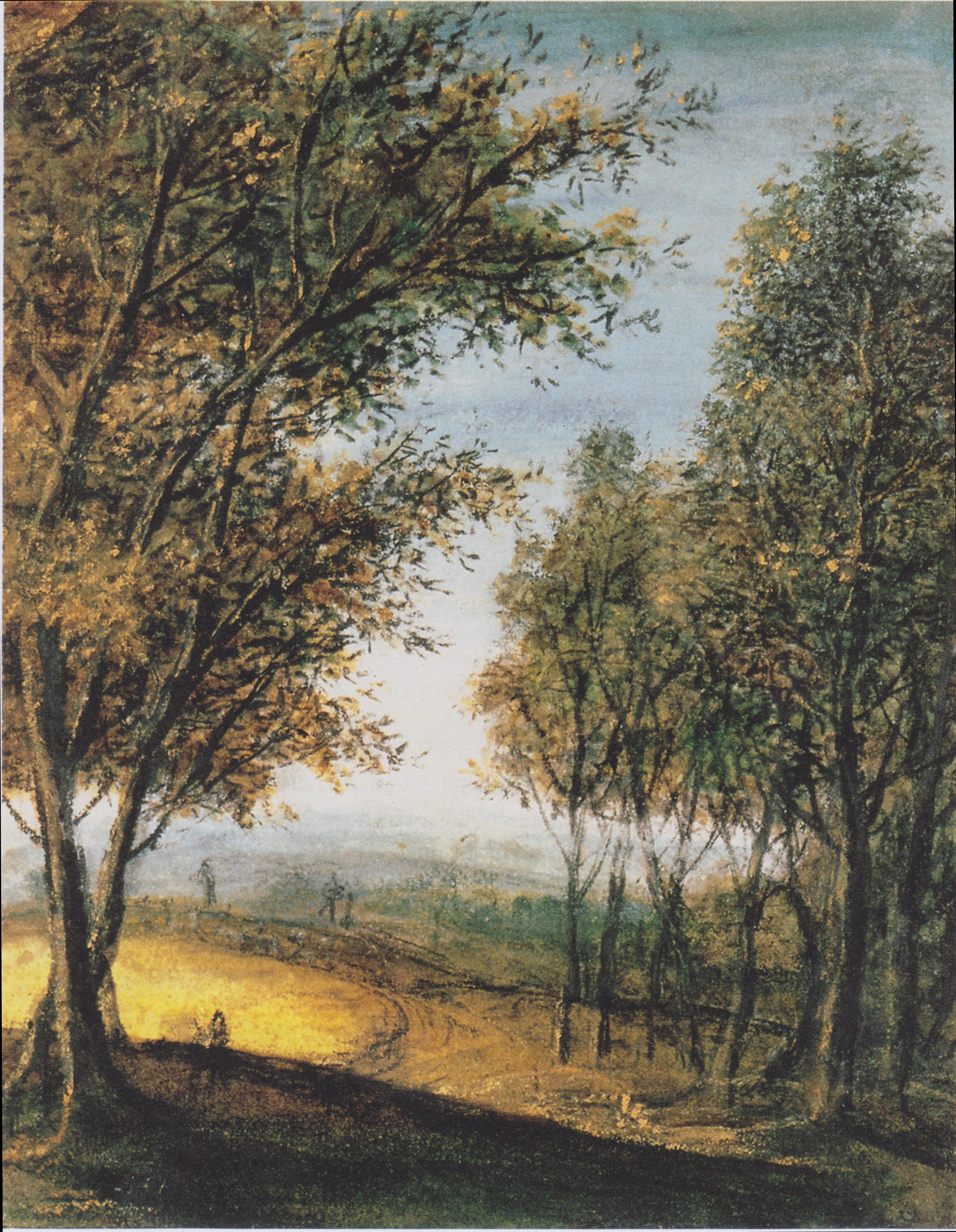
- Forest edge
- Born: Antonie Waterloo; 6 May 1609 (baptised); Lille
- Died: 23 October 1690 (aged 81) (buried); Utrecht
- Known for: Painting
- Movement: Baroque

Antonie Waterloo (6 May 1609 – 23 October 1690) was a Dutch Golden Age landscape painter.

== Biography ==
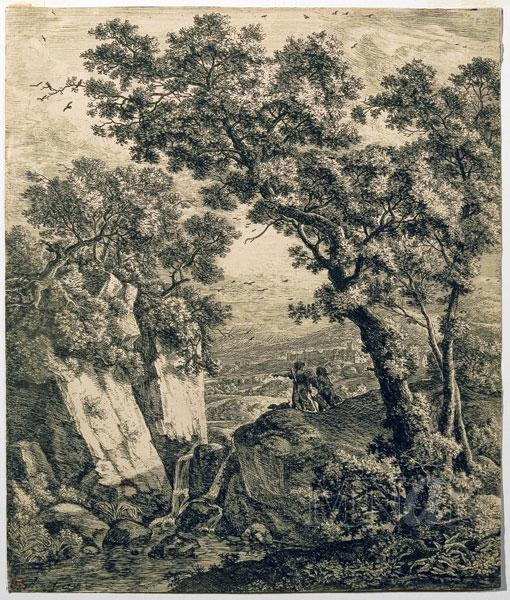
Tobias and the Angel from the Book of Tobit

Waterloo is thought to have been born at Ryssel (Lille), then in the Spanish Netherlands, now part of northern France. His mother was Magdalena Vaillant who became a member of the Walloon Church, Amsterdam in 1621, followed by his own membership in 1630. Little is known of his early life and, as no records of any formal training as an artist have been discovered, he may well have been self taught. Although registered as a painter, he had little success in selling his own canvases and, apparently, supported himself through his activities as an art dealer in addition to sales of his drawings and prints.

In 1640 he married in Amsterdam, and in 1653 he left the church and moved to Leeuwarden, but in 1654 he buried a daughter in Amsterdam before moving to Maarssen in 1655 where he lived until 1676. According to Houbraken he was good friends with Jan Weenix who told Houbraken that he knew him for 45 years and often visited him in his house between Maarssen and Breukelen where he lived as a bachelor, to decorate his landscape paintings with animals and other objects. Houbraken found his landscapes very natural, and liked his manner of painting reflections in water.

Waterloo was among the first artists to have established a reputation almost entirely based upon his work as a draftsman. Oil paintings by Waterloo are relatively scarce, but his many drawings of forest scenes and other topographical views are found in collections in Berlin, Munich, Hamburg, Vienna, Amsterdam, and London. The 1931 catalogue of drawings, for instance lists 29 examples of Waterloo drawings. A landscape artist, Waterloo also produced many etchings which increased his popularity and extended his influence into the next century and beyond to the French Barbizon painters of the mid-19th century. While many of Waterloo's larger etchings and drawings (some almost the size of his paintings) are careful in their depiction of the smallest, individual detail, his smaller drawings of mountain valley views often feature an impressionistic group of forms as atmospheric perspective leads the eye into the hilly distance along a characteristically Baroque zig-zag course. Such drawings may have been known to the English landscape etcher John Robert Cozens and, in turn, may have had a stylistic impact upon the young J. M. W. Turner.

His art dealership exposed him to the work of a number of respected contemporary landscape artists such as Jacob van Ruisdael, Simon de Vlieger, Roelant Roghman, and Allaert van Everdingen, from whom he absorbed a variety of influences. Judging from the locales depicted in his drawings, he traveled widely and his trips to Germany, Switzerland, France, Poland. and even Italy have since been theorized. In Germany, he made a trip along the Rhine, and visited various towns such as Kleef, Bentheim, Hamburg, Altona, Hamburg, Blankenese, Holstein, Bergedorf, Lüneburg and Gdańsk. Waterloo was active in Amsterdam, Leeuwarden, and Utrecht, where he died in 1690.

== Selected works ==
- Paths Leading to a Stream - etching, Utah Museum of Fine Arts
- Landscape with Venus and Adonis, Plate 5 - etching, Utah Museum of Fine Arts
