= Alexander Cooper =

English miniature painter

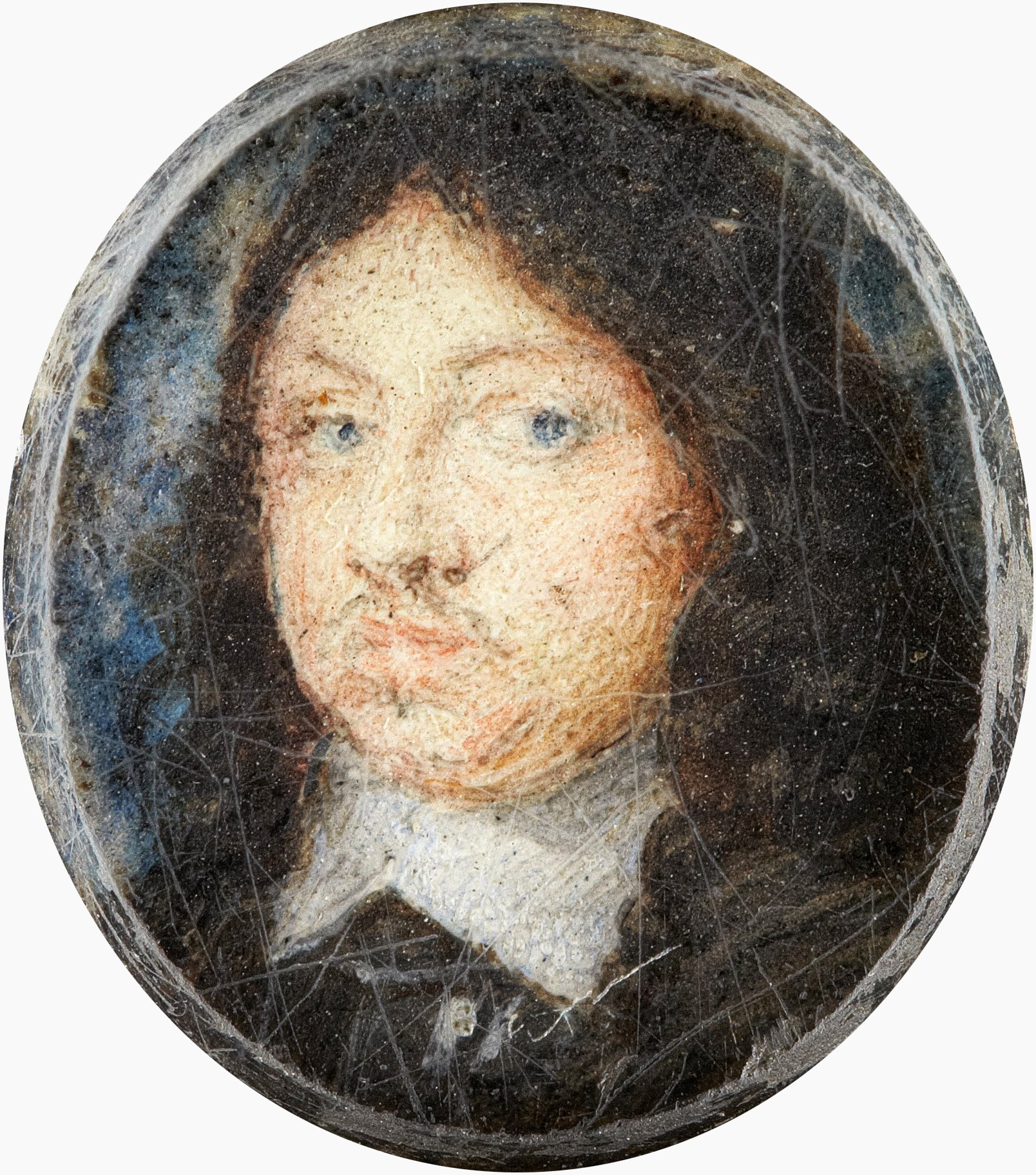
Miniature portrait of Charles X, King of Sweden by Alexander Cooper, Livrustkammaren, 1655–1660

Alexander Cooper (11 December 1609 – 1660) was an English Baroque miniature painter.

== Biography ==
Cooper was born in London, the elder brother of the painter Samuel Cooper. He learned painting from Peter Oliver (painter) and was active in London from 1633 to 1642, whereupon he traveled to The Hague. He is registered there as a member of The Hague Guild of Saint Luke from 1644 – 1646. After a short stay in Amsterdam, he travelled to Sweden in 1646 to work as court painter for Queen regnant Christina of Sweden. According to Houbraken he was considered the best portrait miniaturist in watercolors of his time. He succeeded David Beck as official court painter when Beck returned to The Hague.

His Swedish documents declare that he was Jewish, and that his full name was Abraham Alexander Cooper. He had previously been residing in the United Provinces, but on reaching Sweden entered the service of Christina, and continued to be her miniature painter until 1654, when she resigned the crown. Two years later, Cooper was in Denmark, carrying out some commissions for Christian IV of Denmark but in 1657 was back again in Stockholm, where he died in the early part of 1660, aged fifty.

His works are of great rarity, and the chief are a series representing Frederick V, Elector Palatine and Elizabeth of Bohemia as well as their children. Including Charles I Louis, Elector Palatine, Elisabeth of Bohemia, Princess Palatine, Prince Rupert of the Rhine, Edward, Count Palatine of Simmern and Sophia of the Palatinate. By the late nineteenth century these portraits were in the possession of Wilhelm II of Germany. At the same time some very remarkable portraits were owned by Wilhelmina of the Netherlands, and others were in the possession of Gustav V of Sweden and various Swedish galleries.

He is probably the same painter as Ioannes Coepers of England well-known at the English court in Cornelis de Bie's book of painters called Het Gulden Cabinet.
