= Treaty of Antwerp (1609) =

1609 armistice between Spain and the Netherlands during the Eighty Years' War

The Treaty of Antwerp, which initiated the Twelve Years' Truce, was an armistice signed in Antwerp on 9 April 1609 between Spain and the Netherlands, creating the major break in hostilities during the Eighty Years' War for independence conducted by the Seventeen Provinces in the Low Countries.

== Proposals and terms ==
In February 1608 Dutch negotiators submitted to their Spanish counterparts three different proposals regarding overseas trade in the East Indies. The first proposal suggested that peace in Europe be established with free trade permitted in overseas territories that were not controlled by the Spanish Empire. The second proposal suggested that peace in Europe be established along with a truce permitting free overseas trade for a period of years. The third proposal suggested that overseas trade be based on a "one's own risk" policy. Ultimately, the Spanish chose the second of the three proposals. Based on the terms of the accord, the Netherlands was granted the right to trade within overseas territories controlled by the Spanish Empire under the condition that it acquire an express license from the King of Spain. Moreover, the Dutch were allowed to engage in unhindered trade outside of Spanish colonial possessions and with the permission of the natives. According to a protocol written by English and French envoys, the Dutch managed during the negotiations to reserve the right to help any natives that concluded treaty relations with them and that such actions would not constitute a violation of the overall armistice.

== Hugo Grotius ==
On a sidenote, the formation of the accord was influenced by the writings of Hugo Grotius in Mare Liberum ("The Free Seas"), which was published in 1609 at the insistence of the Dutch East India Company; the pamphlet was published anonymously in Leiden roughly one month prior to the conclusion of the treaty.

== Johan van Oldenbarnevelt ==
Johan van Oldenbarnevelt and the urban oligarchies of Holland developed another peace treaty in order to prevent any renewed hostilities with Spain once the Treaty of Antwerp expired in 1621. However, Stadtholder Maurice of Nassau, Oldenbarnevelt's chief rival in the government of the United Provinces, led a faction of nobles that supported renewing hostilities with Spain and managed to have Oldenbarnevelt arrested in 1618.

== See also ==
- List of treaties

== Sources ==
- Armitage, David. "Making the Empire British: Scotland in the Atlantic World 1542-1707". Past and Present, No. 155. (May, 1997), pp. 34–63.
- Fix, Andrew. "Radical Reformation and Second Reformation in Holland: The Intellectual Consequences of the Sixteenth-Century Religious Upheaval and the Coming of a Rational World View". Sixteenth Century Journal, Volume 18, No. 1 (Spring, 1987), pp. 63–80.
- Grewe, Wilhelm Georg (translated by Michael Byers). The Epochs of International Law. Walter de Gruyter, 2000. ISBN 3-11-015339-4
- Dlugaiczyk, Martina. Der Waffenstillstand (1609–1621) als Medienereignis. Politische Bildpropaganda in den Niederlanden, Münster, New.York 2005.
