= 1600s =

1600s may refer to:

- The century from 1600 to 1699, almost synonymous with the 17th century (1601–1700).
- 1600s (decade), the period from 1600 to 1609
