= Elizabethan Sea Dogs =

Group of privateers

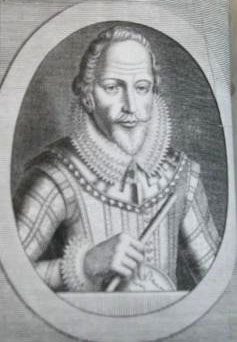
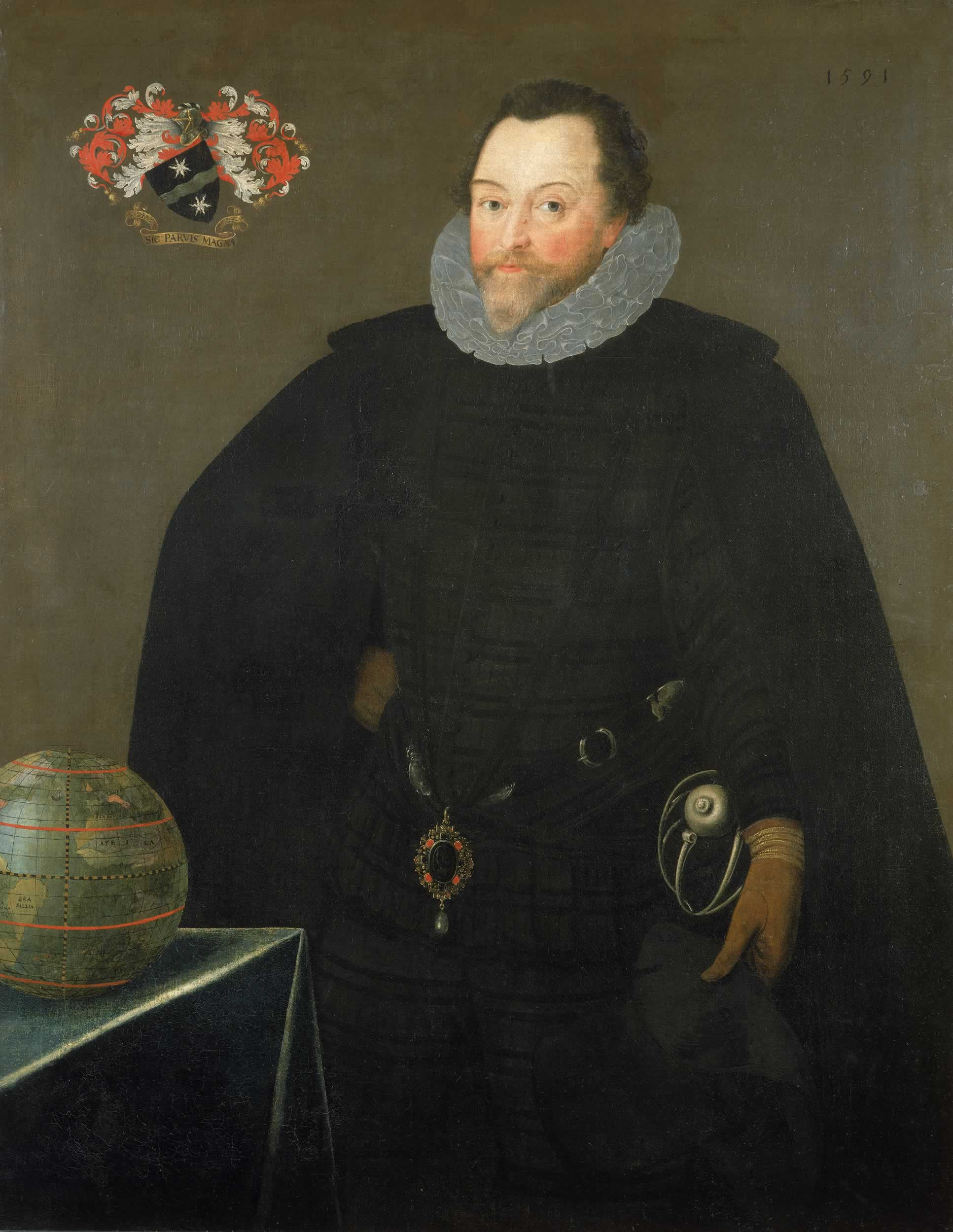
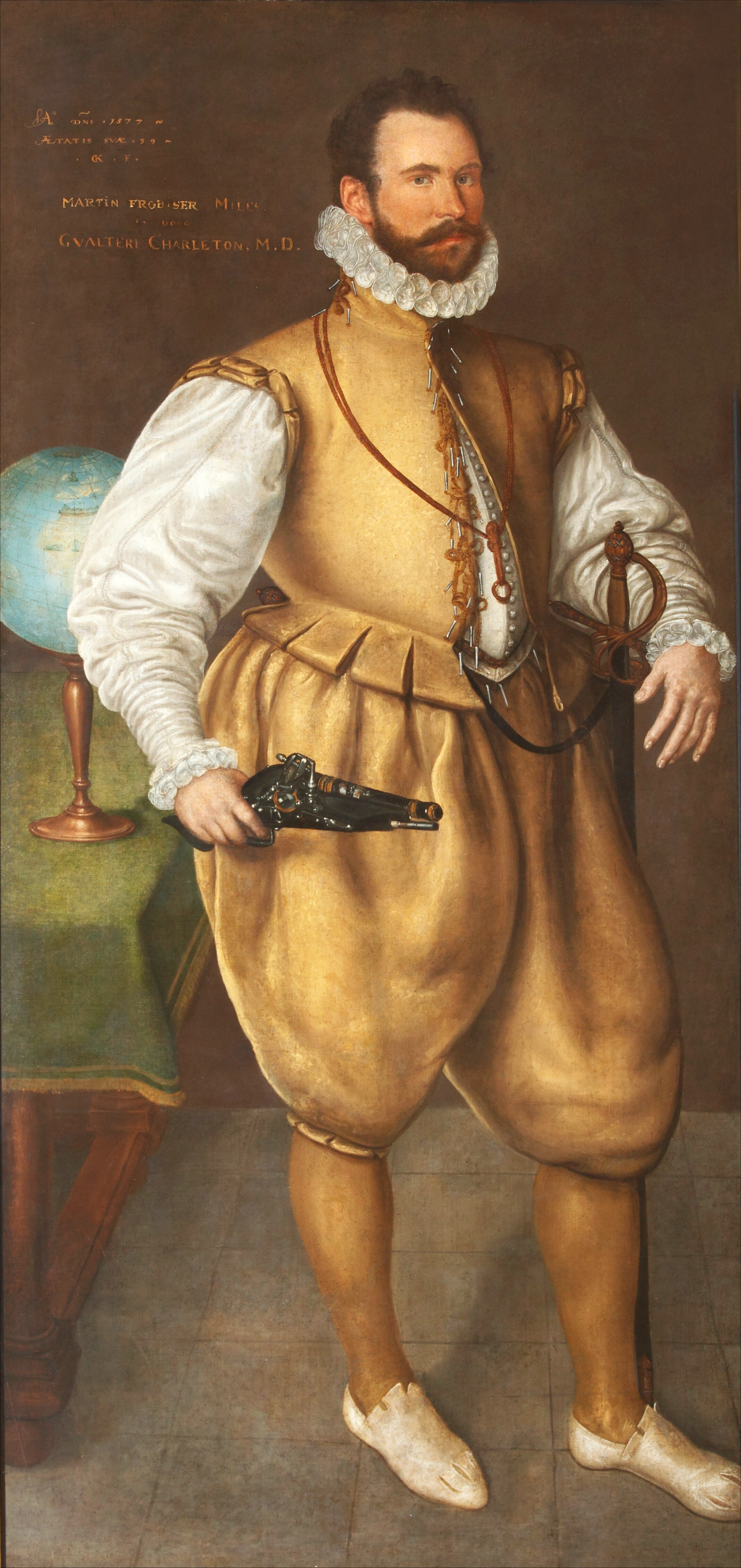
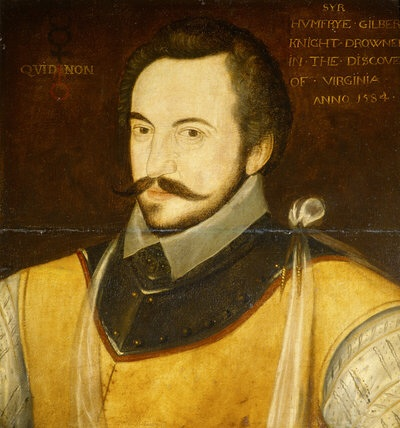
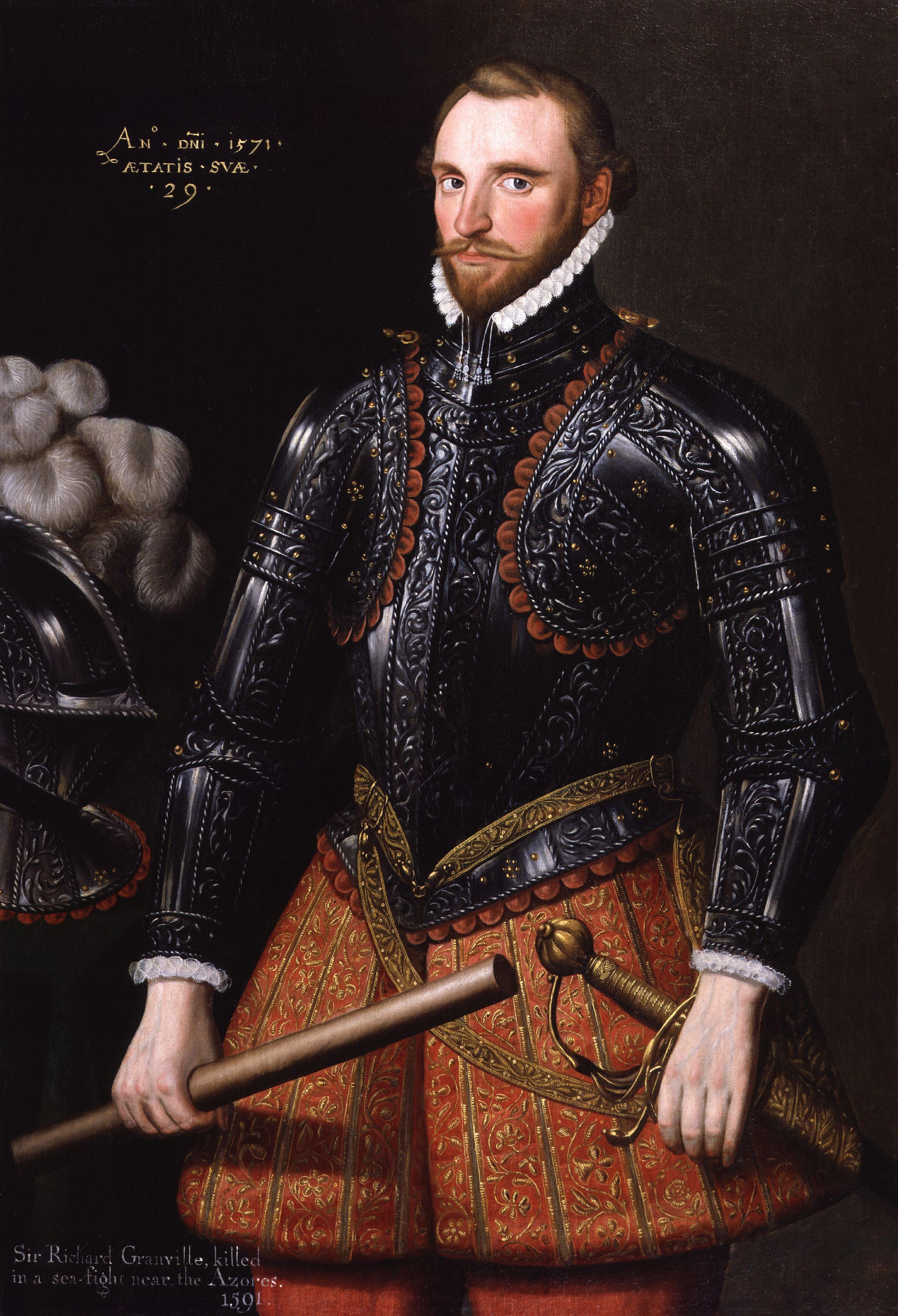
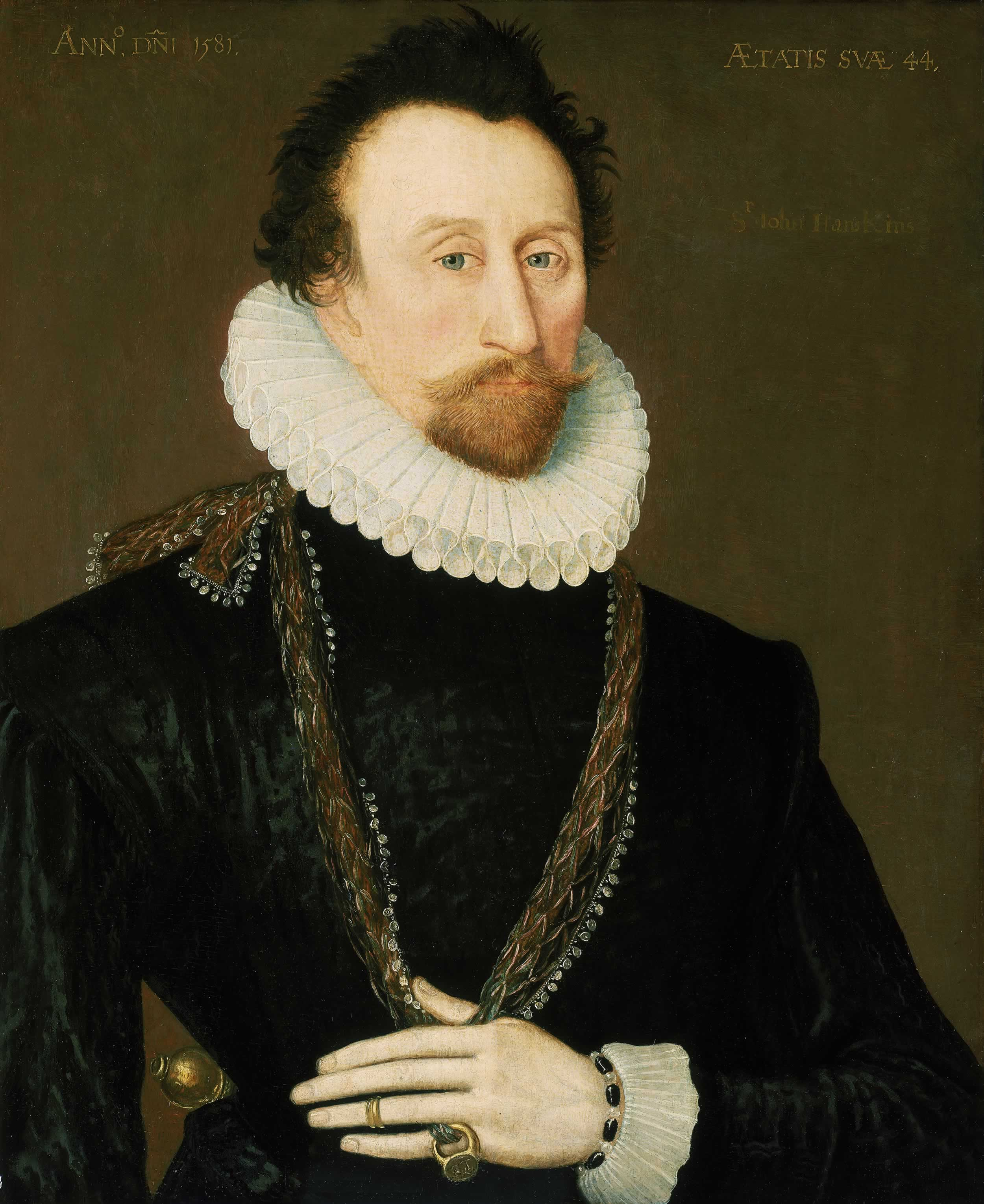
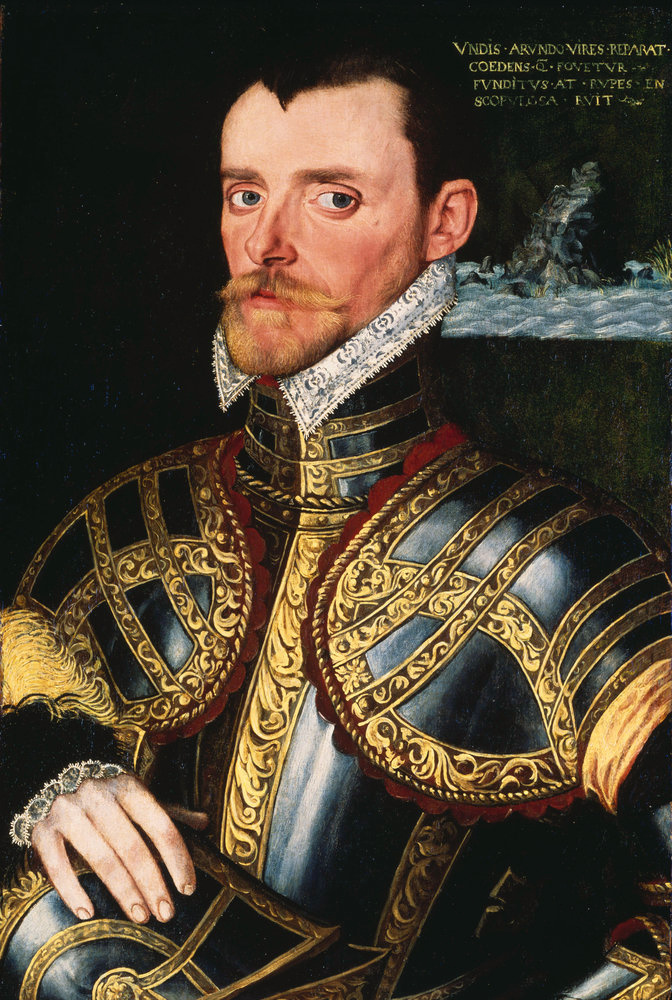
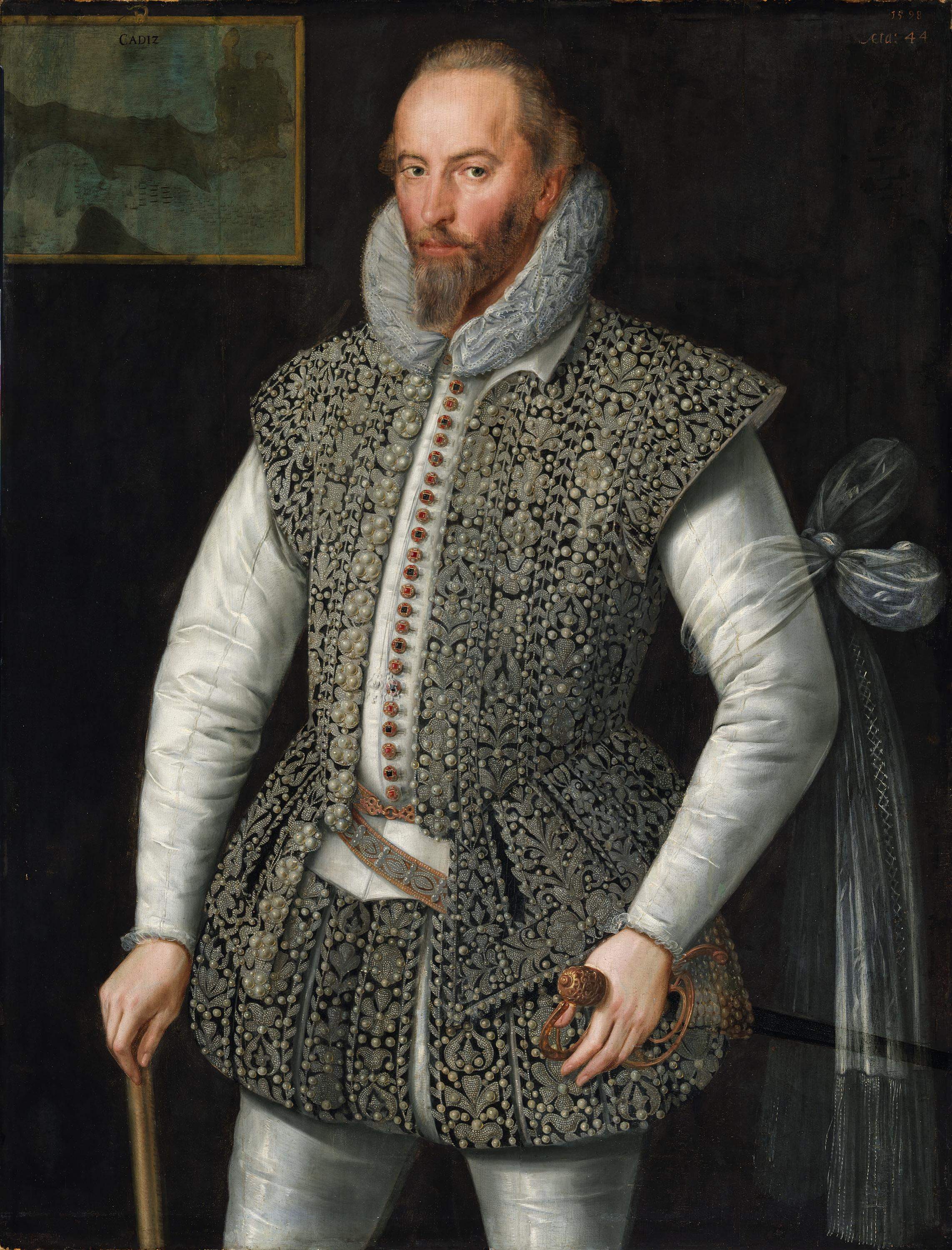
The Sea Dogs:. Clockwise from upper right: Francis Drake, Humphrey Gilbert, John Hawkins, Walter Raleigh, Richard Hawkins, Richard Grenville, Martin Frobisher, John Davis.

The Sea Dogs were a group of English privateers authorised by Queen Elizabeth I to raid England's enemies, whether they were formally at war with them or not. Active from 1560 until Elizabeth's death in 1603, the Sea Dogs primarily attacked Spanish targets both on land and at sea, particularly during the Anglo-Spanish War.

== Overview ==
"Sea Dogs" was an informal name bestowed upon English privateers who were authorised by Queen Elizabeth I to raid England's enemies, even during times of peace. Carrying letters of marque issued by the English Crown, the Sea Dogs frequently attacked both enemy shipping at sea and enemy outposts on land. The issuing of letters of marque was originally done to compensate for the numerical inferiority of the Tudor navy in comparison to its Spanish counterpart; as England lacked a standing navy which was powerful enough to challenge the Spanish Navy head on, the Sea Dogs served as a way to attack Spanish ships during times of peace. In their infancy the Members of the Sea Dogs, including Sir John Hawkins and Sir Francis Drake, had engaged in illicit slave trading with Spanish colonies in the Americas. The Spanish retaliated by defeating an English flotilla at San Juan de Ulúa in 1568. This was remembered by Englishmen, especially Drake, as an egregious example of Spanish treachery. Drake would not pursue trading and slaving but would, instead, dedicate himself to attacking Spanish possessions wherever he found them.

Many of the 'Sea Dogs' later fought against the Spanish Armada enterprise against England in 1588 with Sir Francis Drake notably taking a prominent role in its defeat. Many would also become prominent in the English Navy, some of whom were later promoted to high ranks.

== Privateering ventures ==
The Privateers took part in highly lucrative joint stock expeditions to raid the Spanish Main. English courtiers provided money for their own expeditions as well as others, and even Elizabeth herself would make investments. Most ventures however were mostly organized by the powerful London merchant John Watts who had the backing of most of the English court including Elizabeth. In the three years after the Spanish Armada was defeated, more than 300 prizes were taken from the Spanish with a declared total value of well over £400,000.

== Notable Sea Dogs ==
=== John Davis ===
Davis led several voyages to discover the Northwest Passage and served as pilot and captain on both Dutch and English voyages to the East Indies. He discovered the Falkland Islands in August 1592.

=== Sir Francis Drake ===
Drake was one of the most successful Sea Dogs of all time. As captain of Golden Hind, he served in the Tudor navy from 1563 to 1596 and rose to the rank of Vice-Admiral. Drake was trained from a young age for a career at sea by his cousin, fellow Sea Dog Sir John Hawkins. Following the defeat at San Juan de Ulúa, Drake set on an expedition in 1572 to Panama, which was successful, netting some £20,000. Drake followed this with another even bolder expedition starting in 1577, and eventually became the first Englishman to circumnavigate the world, and returned in 1580. Drake had a huge range of coverage, raiding up the Spanish on the Pacific Coast all the way up to modern day San Francisco, and captured a rich Spanish galleon. In addition to his commandeering of ships, Drake would sail into ports in the Caribbean to put ransoms on cities, after which he would begin burning the city down until he received payment. Drake was awarded a knighthood in 1581.

After taking part against the Spanish Armada in 1588, Drake took part in the unsuccessful English Armada the following year. He thus fell out of favour, and was not given command of another naval expedition until 1595, his last to the Spanish Main. This too was a failure and he became sick, eventually dying of disease after failing to take Puerto Rico, Panama, and other targets in the Spanish Main.

=== Sir Martin Frobisher ===
Frobisher was a seaman and privateer who made three voyages to the New World looking for the Northwest Passage. As a privateer, he plundered riches from French ships. He was knighted for his service in repelling the Spanish Armada in 1588.

=== Sir Humphrey Gilbert ===
Gilbert was educated at Eton College and the University of Oxford, and involved in the first Plantations of Ireland during the Tudor conquest. He was the first to establish the English colonial empire in North America when he took possession of Newfoundland for Queen Elizabeth I on 5 August 1583. He was a maternal half-brother of Sir Walter Raleigh and a cousin of Sir Richard Grenville.

=== Sir Richard Grenville ===
Grenville was lord of the manors of Stowe, Cornwall and Bideford, Devon. He subsequently participated in the plantations of Ireland specifically the Munster plantations, the English colonisation of the Americas and the repulse of the Spanish Armada. In 1591, Grenville died at the battle of Flores fighting against an overwhelmingly larger Spanish fleet near the Azores. He and his crew on board the galleon Revenge fought against the 53-strong Spanish fleet to allow the other English ships to escape.

=== Sir John Hawkins ===
John Hawkins was born into a wealthy family where his father was a sea captain. Hawkins initially sailed with his father on trading trips, but by 1562 he turned to slave trading by using his fleet of three ships led by Jesus of Lübeck to abduct 400 Africans from modern-day Guinea and sell them in the Spanish West Indies. He engaged in slave trading for about five years, making three voyages to Sierra Leone and Guinea and selling 1,200–1,400 enslaved Africans to Spanish colonists in the Americas. He eventually served as Treasurer of the Navy and promoted several reforms. His final expedition was with Drake to the Spanish Main in 1595 which was a failure. Hawkins died not long after Drake, on November 12, 1595, on San Juan near Puerto Rico.

=== Sir Richard Hawkins ===
Richard Hawkins took part in the Spanish Armada in 1588 and the English Armada the following year. In 1593 he purchased the galleon Dainty and used by Hawkins in his expeditions for the West Indies, the Spanish Main and the South Seas.

Hawkins plundered Valparaíso in 1594, but was trapped by two Spanish ships in the Bay of San Mateo, at the mouth of the Esmeraldas river. Hawkins was forced to surrender Dainty and ended up in Spanish captivity until 1602. One of his achievements was proving the benefits of citrus for curing scurvy. Hawkins was knighted in 1603.

=== Sir Walter Raleigh ===
Raleigh was a favourite of Queen Elizabeth, he received a title that allowed him to claim any land that he discovered in the name of England. During an expedition to the New World, he founded the colony of Roanoke, which later vanished. Raleigh became infatuated with the idea of a "city of gold" hidden somewhere in South America and set out on an expedition to find it. In the process the English plundered the Spanish settlement of Trinidad. Raleigh successfully navigated the river and its inlets, penetrating some 400 miles (640 km) into the Guiana highlands, even repelling a Spanish attack. Raleigh would, however, exaggerate the wealth found there upon his return to England publishing his adventure under the title of The Discovery of rich and beautiful empire of Guiana. Raleigh's luck would come to an end with the death of his protector; he would be arrested and beheaded in 1618 on unrelated charges.

=== George Clifford, 3rd Earl of Cumberland ===
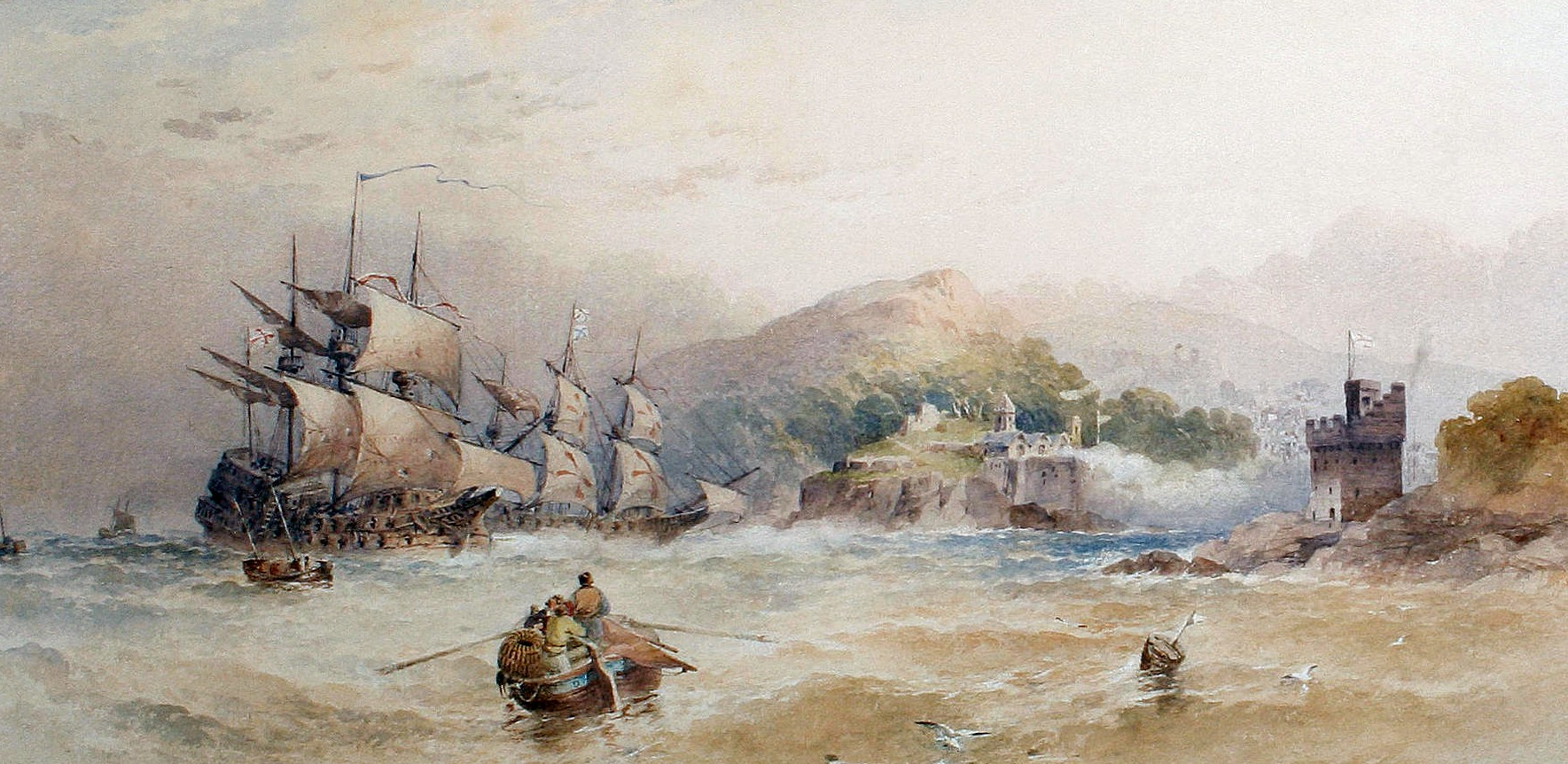
The arrival of the Great Carrack 'Madre de Dios' at Dartmouth Harbour, 18th Sept 1592

Clifford made a number of expeditions, and a few did yield profit – his first being the Azores Voyage in 1589. Others failed however due to bad weather and his 1591 voyage ended in defeat with Spanish galleys off Berlengas. Cumberland with Sir Walter Raleigh and Martin Frobisher combined financial strength and force that led to the most successful English naval expedition of the war. Off Flores island in 1592, the English fleet captured a large Portuguese carrack, the Madre de Deus, and outwitted a Spanish fleet led by Alonso de Bazán. The expedition's reward equalled nearly half the size of the Kingdom of England's royal annual revenue and yielded Elizabeth a 20-fold return on her investment. These riches gave the English an excited enthusiasm to engage in this opulent commerce.

Cumberland's last expedition in 1598 to the Caribbean led to the capture of San Juan, and had succeeded where Drake had failed.

=== Amyas Preston and George Somers ===
In 1595, Amyas Preston and George Somers supported Raleigh's expedition to El Dorado with an expedition to South America too. This successful raid was notable for a daring overland assault that saw the capture of the town of Caracas.

=== James Lancaster ===
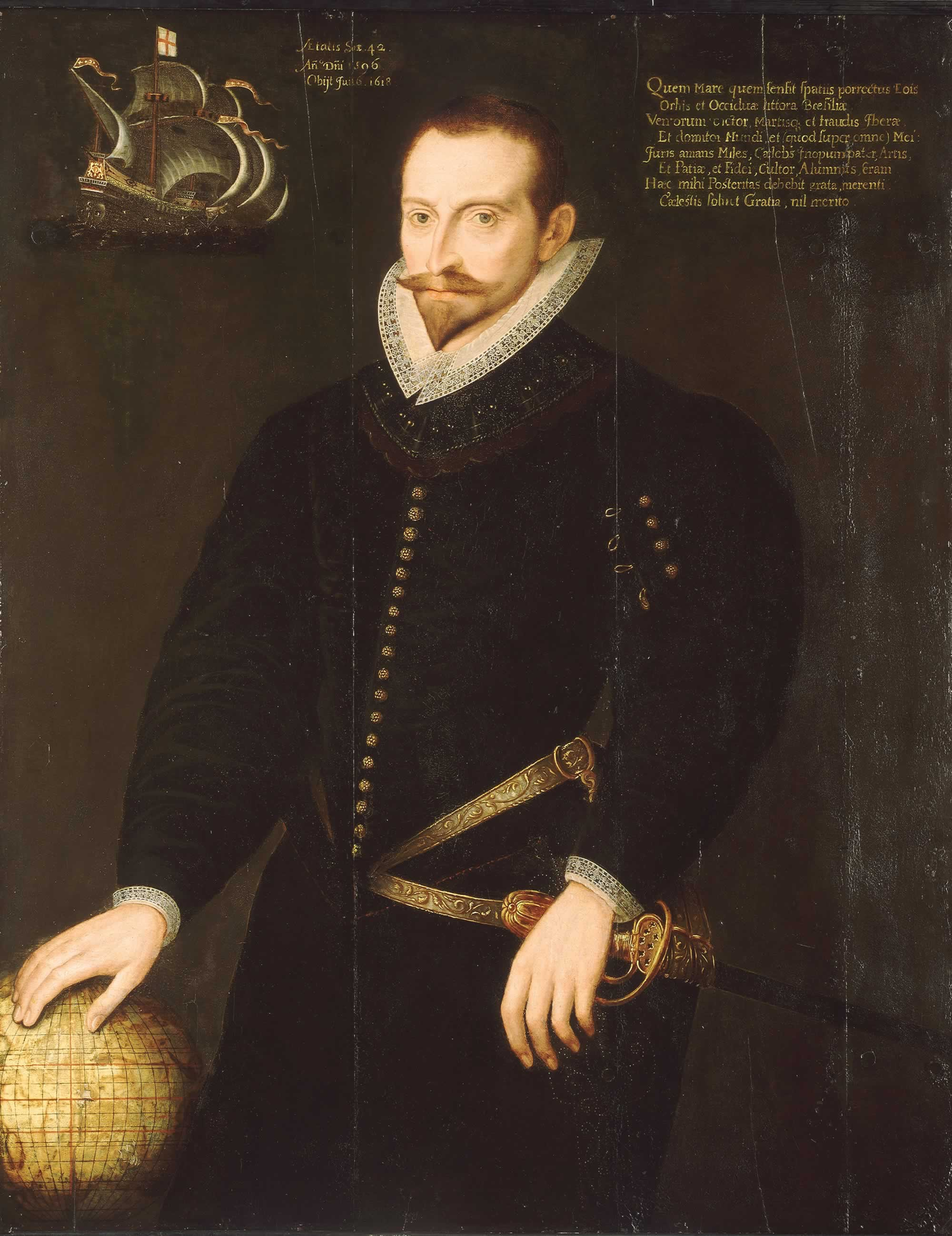
James Lancaster in 1596

Lancaster had been a trader to Portugal before the war. He served in the fleet against the Spanish Armada in 1588, serving under Francis Drake. Afterwards he sought to seek trade elsewhere, and in 1591 went on an expedition to the East Indies which was a disaster. Lancaster ended up having to stay on Penang island off the Malay Peninsula for nearly four months before the restless crew of the fleet demanded to return. They finally reached home in 1594 with only 25 men left.

In 1595 an expedition financed by John Watts to Portuguese Brazil led by Lancaster saw the capture and plunder of Recife and Olinda – which was highly profitable for both.

Lancaster was given command of the East India Company's first fleet which sailed from Torbay on 13 February 1601. The voyage was a huge success, the fleet established the first Company factory at Bantan in Java, the first of its kind, and a commercial mission dispatched to the Moluccas (Spice Islands). Lancaster also seized and looted a large rich Portuguese galleon off Penang. He returned on 11 September 1603 and was rewarded with a knighthood from the newly crowned James I as a result of the expedition's success both in trade and diplomacy.

=== Christopher Newport ===
By far the most successful Sea Dog was Christopher Newport. Newport set out in 1590 to raid the Spanish West Indies, and in the ensuing fight saw the defeat of an armed Spanish convoy but lost his right arm in the process. Despite this, Newport continued privateering – the blockade of Western Cuba in 1591 saw ten Spanish ships including two galleons were captured, making a 200 per cent profit, from which Queen Elizabeth and the Lord High admiral, Charles Howard took half of. The blockade was one of the most successful English expeditions to the Spanish Main during the war.

Newport followed that with another successful expedition to Hispaniola and the Bay of Honduras the following year. Newport struck at Tobasco in 1599, and in the last raid of the war he plundered Puerto Caballos in 1603. By this time, Newport had raided the Spanish Main more times than Drake had.

== Other notable Sea Dogs ==
- William Monsen
- Thomas Cavendish
- William Parker
- Michael Geare
- Anthony Shirley
- William Lane

== Aftermath ==
By the end of the war, the Sea Dogs had devastated the Spanish private merchant marine. Spanish prizes were taken at an attritional rate; nearly 1,000 were captured by the war's end, and there was on average a declared value of approximately £100,000–£200,000 for every year of the war.

Watts eventually saw a significant return from his investments alone, and as a result of his power became one of the founders of the East India Company, being elected its governor in 1601. He was later described to Philip III as "the greatest pirate that has ever been in this kingdom".

Once Elizabeth died in 1603, one year prior to the conclusion of the war, many former Sea Dogs either joined the Dutch cause or sought employment in the Barbary States, becoming corsairs attacking European merchant shipping.
