= Michael Geare =

English sailor, privateer and merchant

Sir Michael Geare
- Born: c. 1565; Limehouse, London, England
- Died: Stepney, London
- Piratical career
- Type: Sea Dog
- Allegiance: England
- Years active: c. 1584–1603
- Rank: Captain
- Base of operations: Caribbean
- Battles: Anglo–Spanish War
- Later work: Merchant

Sir Michael Geare (b. 1565-?) was a 16th-century English sailor, privateer and merchant. One of the many Sea Dogs who plagued the Spanish Empire during the Elizabethan age, Geare was well known to the Spaniards of the West Indies and the Spanish Main as commander of the Little John. He remained one of the most active in the region throughout the 1590s and up until his retirement in 1603.

== Biography ==
Michael Geare was born in Limehouse around 1565, reportedly from a poor cockney background. An apprentice mariner in his youth, Geare embarked on his earliest voyages with Sir George Carew (also known as George Carey) and later Captain John Watts with whom he would first rise to prominence between 1588 and 1591. That same year he took part in the successful Blockade of Western Cuba expedition as captain of the Little John, one of five-ship flotilla under William Lane and financed by Sir Francis Drake among others. Lane gave glowing accounts of Geare's bravery in battle and with whom he began to earn a small fortune from privateering and smuggling activities. Lane eventually began personally financing the Little John which was later renamed the Michael & John when he became a partner with Geare in 1592.

During the next three years, Geare would complete four successful voyages in the West Indies with the Michael & John. In 1595, an encounter with a Spanish galleon near Havana, Cuba resulted in the loss of fifty of his crew and a Spanish pinnace he had previously captured. After making his escape, Geare was able to recoup his losses by capturing another Spanish prize before returning to England.

Commanding the Neptune the following year, he was accompanied to the Caribbean by a pinnace sailed by John Rilesden and Christopher Newport. He and fifteen men stole the pinnace later that year and captured several prizes before arriving in Jamaica to join a privateering expedition to Honduras led by Sir Anthony Shirley and Captain William Parker. After a failed raid against Trujillo, they turned towards Puerto Caballos and successfully captured the city. Finding little of value however, Geare decided to part company with Shirey and Parker who continued overland across the mountains of Guatemala and to the Pacific coast.

In May 1601, while in the West Indies with David Middleton with the pinnace James, he captured three ships while in command of the Archangel. Although he managed to bring back two of the captured ships, he lost contact with the third. Its crew eventually sailed to Morocco where it was sold there instead. Participating in a three-ship consort with Captain Christopher Newport the following year, he captured two Spanish warships among several others. On 24 January 1603 Geare and Christopher Newport participated in a joint Anglo-French operation when they directed eight ships during the landing of armed privateers near Santiago, Cuba. Their advance was halted by the Spanish Governor Fernando Melgarejo de Cordoba, both by a single artillery piece and stampeding a herd of cattle towards the raiders, and they were eventually forced to flee. Soon after he and Christopher Newport then attacked Puerto Caballos again after they heard that two Spanish galleons were unloading their goods, in a bold move the English and French captured them after a hard fight burning one and taking the other as a prize. The booty from this was considerable and after this last adventure, he decided to retire to Stepney, a suburb of London. His home, having a small dagger hung outside, gained some notoriety during his later years. Shortly after his return to England, he was bestowed a knighthood by Queen Elizabeth I. Upon his death, he left an annual allowance of five pounds to be shared among the families of those lost at sea and the indigent sailors of his native Limehouse.
