= Raid on Tabasco (1599) =

English military expedition during the Anglo–Spanish War

- Part of the Anglo–Spanish War
Date	2–15 November 1599
Location	Tabasco, New Spain (present day Mexico)
Result	English victory

Belligerents
Spain	England

Commanders and leaders
Lázaro Suárez de Córdova	Christopher Newport

Strength
Unknown	5 ships 180 soldiers

Casualties and losses
Unknown; 2 ships captured	Unknown

The Raid on Tabasco, Capture of Tabasco or Newport's 2nd Expedition of 1599 was an English military expedition during the Anglo–Spanish War that captured the Spanish port settlement of Tabasco in New Spain. The English under Christopher Newport then occupied the town and gained a significant amount of booty before heading home.

Christopher Newport was no stranger to raiding the Spanish New World and had been doing so since 1587 and was successful in every venture. He even lost half of his arm during his successful 1590 expedition when seizing a ship from the Spaniards off Hispaniola. After returning from an expedition in 1598 with two valuable Spanish prizes, Newport immediately decided to venture out again in mid-1599. He resumed his command of the vessels the Neptune, Blessing, and the Triton being of 300–350 tons apiece.

== Raid ==
They set sail from Plymouth, England for the Spanish Main in late September and on a rapid voyage seized two small Spanish prizes to increase their size to five. Their target was the port of Tabasco (then called San Juan Bautista) in the Bay of New Spain under governor Lázaro Suárez de Córdova.

Newport arrived off the New Spain coast in late October; Tabasco lay on the southeast of New Spain, with the Gulf of Mexico to the north. Newport then sailed to a point a few miles from the port where the English waded ashore. In the early hours they advanced towards the town; a Spanish rider warned de Córdova of the English approach but it was too late and the town was overrun and then captured after some resistance. Newport then occupied the town and held the place for two weeks; two merchant ships were captured along with most of the valuables inside. The inhabitants did not have time to flee so the English raided everything; the churches were ransacked and before departing, Tabasco was then stripped bare but was not torched.

The raid was a not a huge success in terms of finance as the booty consisted of only 888 ounces of silver coins which at the time were worth £220. In addition fourteen ounces of gold and pearls, forty one hides, and the bells of the town's churches were taken. The raids for Newport proved to be addictive and he set out again in 1602 in May capturing many Spanish prizes at Havana before setting out again later in the year before striking at Puerto Caballos in 1603. By this time he had raided the Spanish Main more times than Francis Drake had.
