= Newport's 1592 expedition =

English privateer attacks against the Spanish Main

- Part of the Anglo–Spanish War
Date	April – June, 1592
Location	Hispaniola, Bay of Honduras
Result	English victory

Belligerents
England	Spain

Commanders and leaders
Christopher Newport	Lope de Vega Portocarrero

Strength
200 men 4 ships.	Militia and natives various shore defences

Casualties and losses
Light	4 towns sacked 19 ships captured, sunk or scuttled

Newport's 1592 expedition was a series of privateering attacks which took place between April and June 1592 on the Spanish Main, mostly on the island of Hispaniola between an English raiding force led by Christopher Newport and defending Spanish garrisons. The largest engagement took place at the town of La Yaguana. Newport then completed his expedition by raiding settlements and shipping in the Bay of Honduras before heading home without losing any ships.

== Background ==
In 1590, Christopher Newport in a partnership with famed London Merchant John Watts had participated in the highly successful expedition to the Caribbean. Newport lost an arm during a fight to capture a Spanish galleon, but despite his injury, Newport still wanted to continue with his privateering raids. The following year he conducted another highly successful expedition by blockading Havana.

Back in England during the winter of 1591/1592, Newport prepared for another expedition to the Caribbean as a joint stock operation, this time against the island of Hispaniola. Of the eleven shareholders of the expedition, seven were London merchants, including Watts. The English Crown granted letters of reprisal to Newport for an expedition comprising four ships totalling some 300-350 tons with nineteen cannon and 200 men in all. Newport's flagship Golden Dragon of 150 tons led in company with Prudence, commanded by Hugh Merrick, Margaret captained by Robert Thread and Virgin (a pinnace) captained by Henry Kedgell. On 25 January 1592 they set off with favourable winds and headed to the Spanish Main.

On April 4, 1592, they arrived off the island of Hispaniola, and after landing on a deserted beach, moved inland and replenished with food and water. Hispianola was governed by Lope de Vega Portocarrero who had been struggling with French and English attacks across the island. Militia had been set up along the coastal towns to ward off any attacks.

== Newport's sweep ==
On April 11 they landed at Isla de Mona for supplies after having captured a Portuguese slave ship bound from Guinea to Cartagena de Indias. At Saona Island the men were trained in hand to hand and boarding combat. Soon after embarking, a Spanish frigate was captured with jars of copper for trade in wine at Puerto Rico. Another two more Spanish frigates were captured as they sailed round Hispaniola.

=== Hispaniola ===
Ocoa

Three days later they looked to raid the town of Ocoa, Newport landed and moved inland shortly thereafter. They then attacked and overwhelmed the weak militia force that lay in front of them, dispersing them and subsequently took the town. They captured two more frigates in the harbour and promptly sacked Ocoa. The Spaniards then ransomed the town with cattle, and two wayne loades of sugar which proved to be of considerable value. The addition of the frigates (five in total) proved a useful addition to the fleet. The English left the town and sailed to Cap Tiburon where they left their ships sheltered by an uninhabited island.

La Yaguana

The small fleet had rounded Tiburon Peninsula and anchored off Gonave island. On 2 April Newport transferred 110 men from his ships to make a surprise attack on the Spanish town of La Yaguana. It was an important trading port which had three streets and 150 houses.

On 27 April two hours before sunrise they landed at the harbour but are themselves surprised by a Spanish frigate of 35 tons coming into shore. The alarm was raised and the Spanish garrison mustered to counter the English force. Seeing surprise was not in their favour and fearing for his now unprotected ships, Newport ordered a retreat back to their boats and seized the Spanish ship instead. In this time however most of the towns valuables were sent further inland by the inhabitants.

Later in the day however Newport's force regrouped and landed again. They were set upon by the Spanish as they come ashore but overcome any resistance losing two men killed in the fighting. The Spanish were pushed back by the English force and the town's governor was killed in the melee. Just as the English come into the town, 150 Spanish militia including a detachment of cavalry then launched an attack with help of 200 stampeding cattle. The cattle stampeded in the attackers direction, but English pikemen stood their ground and forced the cattle round who then turned in the direction of the Spanish cavalry. The Spanish militia were routed and fled the town further inland. The English then took the town with only light resistance and Newport attempted a ransom. They got no response and then promptly sacked the whole place and stole the church bells. All of the 150 houses in the settlement were burned and the crops in the fields suffered the same fate.

Newport then landed at many other points of the colony and carried destruction wherever he went. The nearby town of Goâve suffered the same fate. He thus by one day's inroad destroyed the hard earnings of many years industry and threw a blight upon the prosperity of the colony which, according to Jonathan Brown in 1837, no future effort could overcome.

=== Bay of Honduras ===
Newport after finishing with Hispaniola sailed to the Bay of Honduras looking to wreak havoc on the Spanish settlements of Truxillo and Puerto de Caballos. At Truxillo the English intercepted a Spanish coaster then sent boat parties using Spanish colours inside the harbour and attacked a handful of anchored vessels. Despite fire from onshore batteries - four of the Spanish ships were seized. Sailing onto Puerto de Caballos the English went ashore and seized the town without opposition - its inhabitants had fled inland. The 200 empty buildings were pillaged and the English stayed for a day roaming inland looking for anything of value. They did not however burn the town having been satisfied with good haul of booty. When the English re-embarked and reversed course east, they came across a 200-ton Spanish merchantman, anchored offshore. Newport seized the vessel but the crew abandoned their ship having set it ablaze before the English could board.

A second attempt to capture vessels at Truxillo was made - although one vessel was captured, an attempt on another was thwarted by a combination of alert Spanish defences and a storm which scattered the English fleet and its prizes.

Newport however satisfied with the haul decided to head for home - the prizes were escorted by the ‘’Margaret’’ and ‘’Virgin’’. For this part of the expedition Newport's little fleet had seized eight ships.

On his return home Newport sailed though past Florida Keys. They landed on one of the islands and encountered the Calusa natives who were friendly - willing to trade precious metals for tools, water and food. After this encounter they sailed through the Bahama Channel and captured another Spanish vessel containing valuable tobacco, as well as pigs. The prisoners and ship were released, but all the contents taken.

== Aftermath ==
Newport with Dragon and Prudence set sail for the Azores on their way home. Just before they got to the islands in August, they encountered Roebuck Captained by John Burgh, who informed of them that he was part of the fleet (led by Martin Frobisher) outfitted by the Queen which was attempting to surprise Portuguese vessels returning from the East Indies heading to the area. In this Newport assisted in the capture of the rich Portuguese carrack Madre de Deus after a long naval battle off the island of Flores.

Newport returned home to count the plunder of his expedition which was considered moderately successful. In all Newport had sacked four towns and seized a total of nineteen ships. The booty included some six tons of quicksilver, three church bells, as well as silks, sixteen tons of sack, sugar, livestock and other merchandise which proved valuable.

Diego de Ybarra the treasurer of Santo Domingo complained that the English were ‘as numerous and as assiduous as though these were ports of their own countries’. The actions of Newport on the coast of Northern Hispaniola forced the Spanish Governor Portocarrero to order the evacuation of the towns there – Bayaba, Puerto Plata and La Yaguana were moved further South. This part of the island, the West and North West were eventually abandoned in 1606 to the latter buccaneers; the direct successors of the Elizabethan corsairs.
