= Capture of Portobello (1601) =

Military event

- Part of the Anglo–Spanish War (1585–1604)
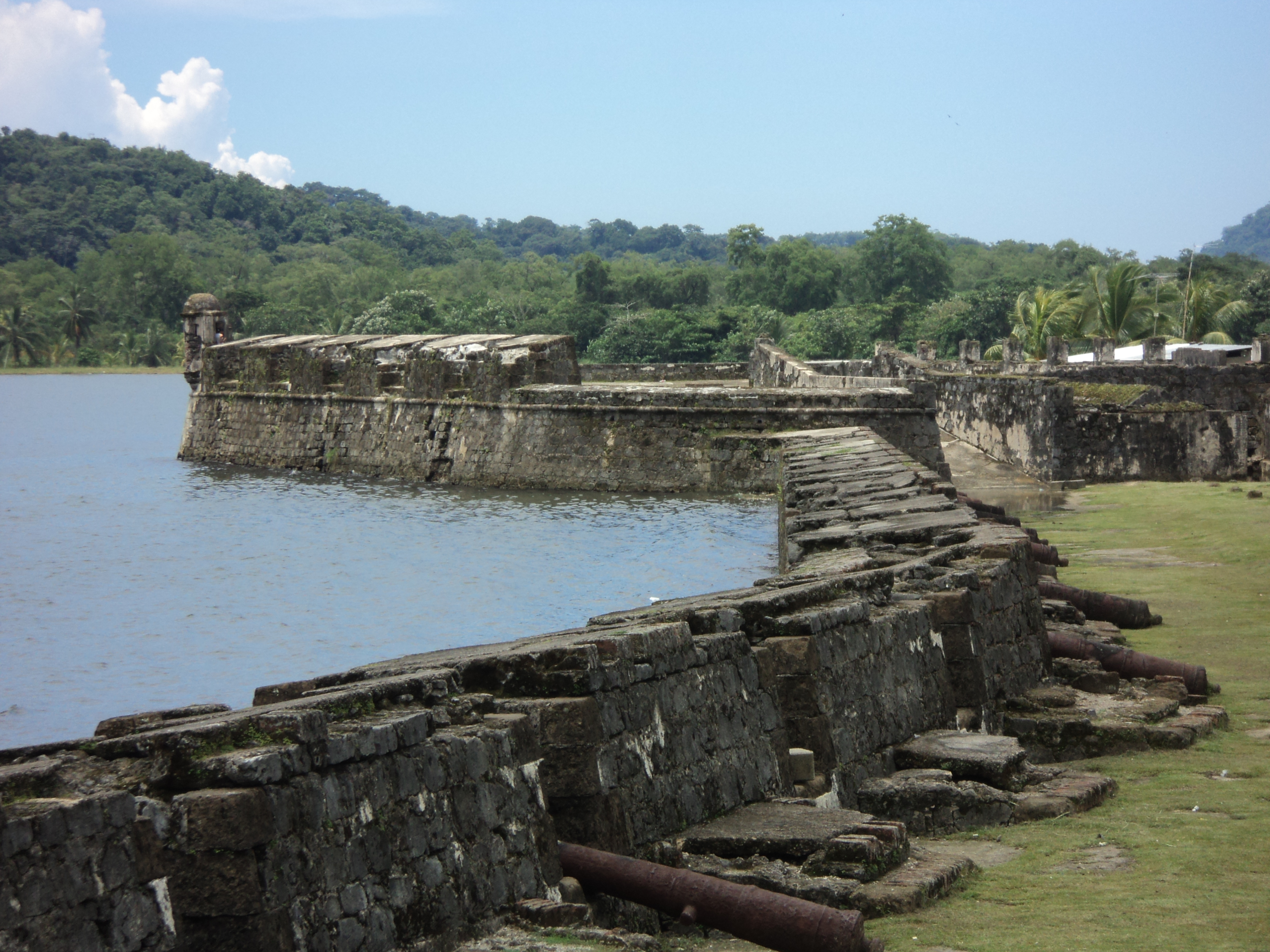
- Present-day ruins of 16th and 17 centuries Santiago de la Gloria fort at seaport town of Portobelo, Colon, Isthmus of Panama on the Spanish Main of the then world-wide Spanish Empire
| Date | 17 January 1601 |
| Location | Portobelo, Colón, Spanish Main; Spanish Empire (present-day Republic of Panama) |
| Result | English victory |

Belligerents
| Spain | England |

Commanders and leaders
| Gov Pedro Meléndez | Sir William Parker of Plymouth, England (died 1618) |

Strength
| 100 soldiers 3 ships | 5 ships 200 soldiers & sailors |

Casualties and losses
| 50 casualties 3 ships captured | Light |

The Capture of Portobello was a military event during the long ongoing Anglo–Spanish War of 1585-1604, in which an English naval expedition under the command of privateer William Parker (died 1618), of Plymouth, assaulted and took the seaport town of Portobelo at Colon on the eastern / northern coast of Panama / Isthmus of Panama in Central America, from the Spanish, captured some looted booty, and then sacked the place, an important site on the Spanish Main in the then world-wide Spanish Empire.

== Capture ==
=== Background ===
The war with the Kingdom of Spain and its then world-wide Spanish Empire, was continuing and English privateers were still roaming the Empire's Spanish Main in the Americas for prizes and attacking ports. In November 1600, English privateer Captain William Parker, sailed from the seaport of Plymouth on the southwest coast of England, facing the English Channel.

He was in command of a modest venture consisting of a small fleet of the 100-ton Prudence, the 60-ton Pearl (commanded by Robert Rawlins), a pinnace, and two small shallops with the flotilla crew in all numbering 200 seamen. At Cubagua they were offered a ransom in exchange for a number of pearl boats they had seized. Near Cabo de le Veda they captured a Portuguese slaving ship. Captain Parker next guided what was now grown to a flotilla of six ships to the east of a recently abandoned Nombre de Dios and approached Portobello in pinnaces and shallops with the help of the black guides.

=== Assault ===
Under cover of darkness early in the morning of 6 February they employed a captured Portuguese to respond to a challenge from the newly completed fort of San Felipe on the North shore and after succeeding in this ruse were able to bypass the place without hindrance.

They then disembarked a vanguard of some forty men from the shallops. Parker and his men were then able to enter the city on the south shore unopposed since the castle of Santiago de la Gloria was positioned too far away to offer any protection. Whilst some of their party created as much noise and panic as possible in their attack on the barracks and crown buildings the remainder of the English took control of the harbour.

The 100 Spanish defenders which the Spanish Governor Pedro Meléndez had sent were too little too late. There was a bitter battle fought to seize the treasure house but it was captured after some forty Spaniards were surrounded, all being either killed or captured. The English were able to push the rest of the Spanish troops with ease inland and with only a few casualties. By the end of the day however Parker had secured the town and set about garrisoning the place. About 30 Spanish prisoners were taken among whom was the governor and several persons of importance. The English prepared for a Spanish counterattack but it never came.

=== Aftermath ===
Parker could only hold the town for 24 hours and the next day found no large bullion shipments of precious metals of gold or silver. He did however acquire a large haul of booty and he had taken a further three prizes of ships when the harbor was secured. Parker then went about sacking the town and he burnt the outlying town of Triana to the ground. After this and with all the booty that could be collected along with captured cannons, Parker then withdrew releasing the prisoners.

The English fleet then stood out to sea with a total 10,000 ducats of booty. Parker set sail for England, returning to Plymouth in May 1601 where he distributed his prize money and in September of that year became Lord Mayor of Plymouth.

A few years later, he would then become a founding member of the new Virginia Company organized in London in 1606, which soon sent expeditions across the Atlantic in the next year of 1607, and succeeding years to establish and settle the Colony of Virginia (modern U.S. state / Commonwealth of Virginia) and first town of Jamestown on the North bank of the James River, upstream in the interior from the Chesapeake Bay, on the East Coast of the North America continent, the beginnings of English America / British America and the Thirteen Colonies of the soon world-wide British Empire over the next four hundred years.
