= Christopher Newport =

English seaman, privateer (1561–1617)

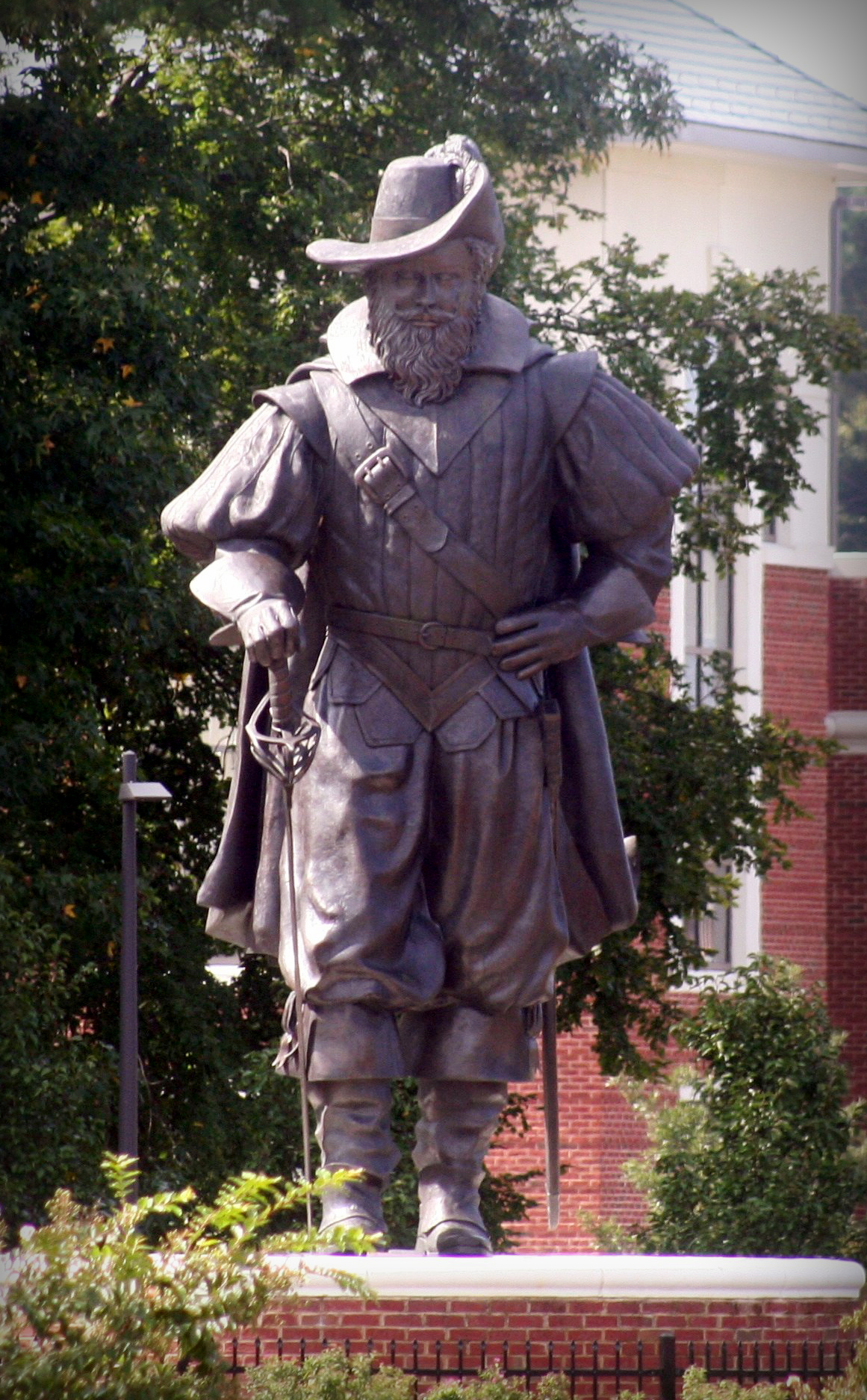
- Statue of Christopher Newport on the campus at Christopher Newport University depicts him with both arms, prior to the loss of one arm in the Anglo-Spanish War. Monumental Sculpture by Jon Hair
- Born: December, 1561; Limehouse, London, England
- Died: August 1617 (aged 55); Bantam, Java, Banten Sultanate
- Spouse(s): Katherine Proctor (1584-1590); Ellen Ade (1590); Elizabeth Glanville (1595-?)
- Military career
- Rank: Vice Admiral
- Commands: Little John (1590), Golden Dragon (1592), Susan Constant (1607), John and Francis (1608), Mary and Margaret (1608), Prosperous (1611), Expedition (1613)
- Known for: Privateering, Watts' West Indies and Virginia expedition, Captain of the Susan Constant and Jamestown supply missions

Christopher Newport (1561–1617) was an English seaman and privateer. During the war with Spain Newport was one of the most successful 'Elizabethan Sea Dogs' to venture to the Spanish Main, making large profits.

Newport is best known as the captain of the Susan Constant, the largest of three ships which carried settlers for the Virginia Company in 1607 on the way to found the settlement at Jamestown in the Virginia Colony, which became the first permanent English settlement in North America. He was also in overall command of the other two ships on that initial voyage, in order of their size, the Godspeed and the Discovery.

He made several voyages of supply between England and Jamestown; in 1609, he became Captain of the Virginia Company's new flagship, Sea Venture, which met a hurricane during the Third Supply mission and was shipwrecked on the archipelago of Bermuda.

Christopher Newport University in Newport News, Virginia, was named in his honour.

== Early life ==
Christopher Newport was born in Limehouse, an important trading port on the River Thames in December 1561. His father, also named Christopher Newport, was a shipmaster who worked in the commercial shipping trade on the east coast of England. The maiden name of his mother Jane is unknown. Newport was christened at the Anglican St. Nicholas Church in Harwich on 29 December. Newport went to sea in 1580, and he quickly rose to the rank of a master mariner and dealt with trade going into London. On 19 October 1584 he married Katherine Proctor in Harwich.

=== Privateer ===
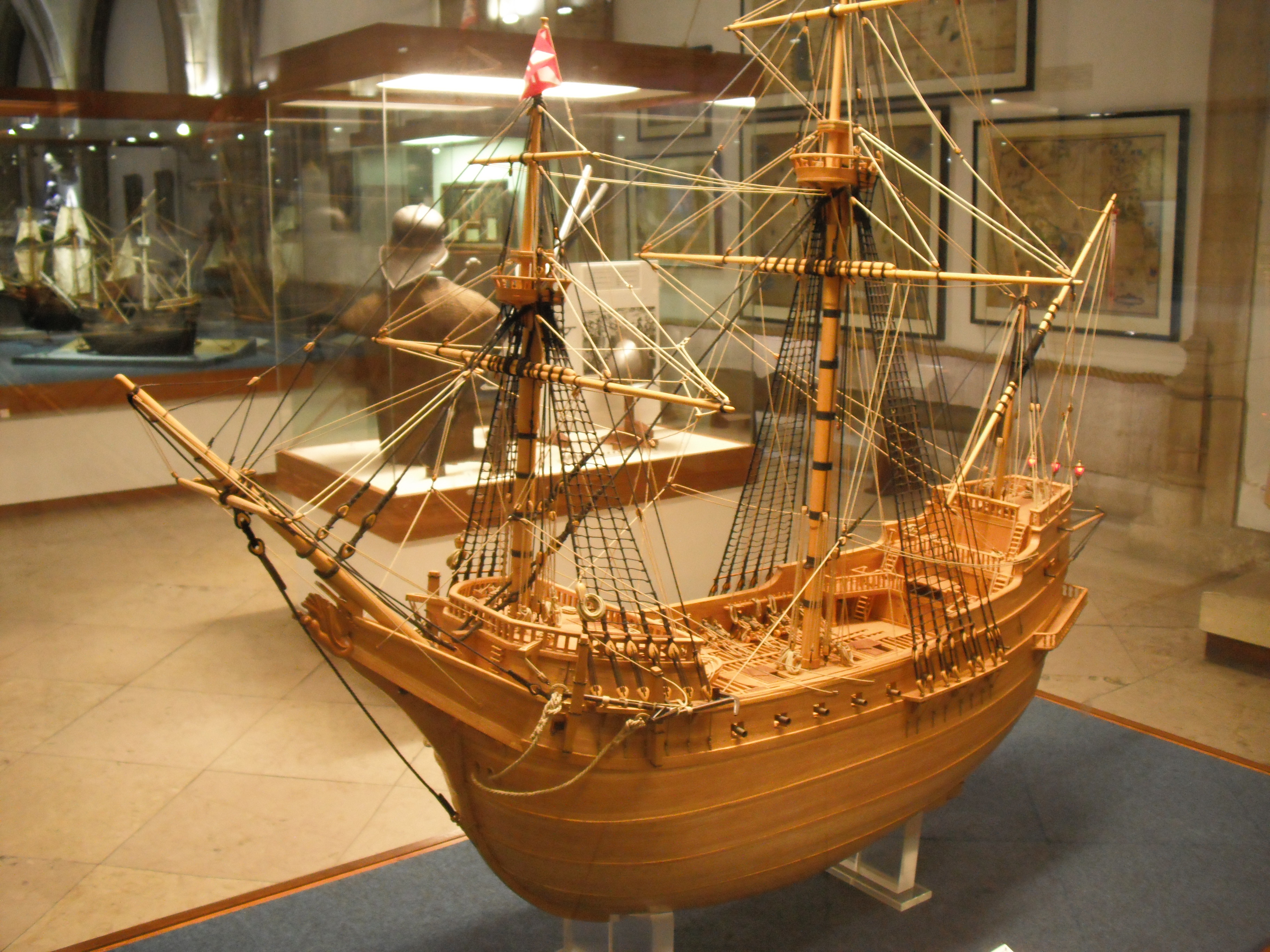
Model of the Portuguese Carrack Madre de Deus. Newport helped in the capture of this large rich vessel off the Azores in 1592

From 1585 following the outbreak of the Anglo–Spanish War, Newport worked as a privateer who raided Spanish freighters off and on in the Caribbean. Over the years he commanded a series of privateer ships, including the Little John, the Margaret, and the Golden Dragon. In 1590, Newport participated in an expedition to the Caribbean, which was financed and organised by famed London merchant John Watts. On this voyage, Newport lost an arm during a fight to capture a Spanish galleon.

Despite his injury, Newport continued to conduct privateer raids for almost twenty years, working with Watts. His accomplishments during this period included a successful expedition off Cuba in 1591 and raided Hispaniola and the Bay of Honduras. A few months later Newport assisted in the capture of the Portuguese ship Madre de Deus off the Azores in 1592. This prize yielded the greatest English plunder of the century, including five hundred tons of spices, silks, gemstones, and other treasures. Christopher Newport also sailed with Sir Francis Drake on Drake's famous raid on Cadiz, Spain.

Back in the Caribbean Newport captured Tabasco in November 1599. An attempt to raid Spanish Jamaica in January 1603 ended in failure, after being repelled by militia under the command of Governor Fernando Melgarejo. A month later Newport conducted his last big raid of the war, raiding Puerto Caballos. He continued raiding the Caribbean until May taking an additional pair of Spanish prizes near Havana before heading back to England. The spoils from all these raids were shared with London merchants who funded them. By the time the war had ended in 1604 Newport had raided the Spanish Main more times than Francis Drake had.

In a peaceful mission to the Caribbean, he returned to England in late 1605 with two baby crocodiles and a wild boar. These he presented as gifts to King James I, who had a fascination with exotic animals.

== Jamestown ==
It was Newport's experience as well as his reputation which led to his hiring in 1606 by the Virginia Company of London. The company had been granted a proprietorship to establish a settlement in the Virginia Colony by King James I. Newport took charge of the ship Susan Constant, and on the 1606–1607 voyage, she carried 71 colonists, all male, one of whom was John Smith. As soon as land was in sight, sealed orders from the Virginia Company were opened which named Newport as a member of the governing Council of the Colony. On 29 April, Newport erected a cross at the mouth of the bay, at a place they named Cape Henry, to claim the land for the Crown. In the following days, the ships ventured inland upstream along the James River seeking a suitable location for their settlement as defined in their orders. Newport (accompanied by Smith) then explored the Powhatan Flu (River) up to the site of present-day Richmond (the Powhatan Flu would soon be called the James River), then a few weeks after arriving at Jamestown he was allowed to assume his seat on the council.

=== First and Second Supply missions ===
In June 1607, a week after the initial Fort at Jamestown was completed, Newport sailed back for London on the Susan Constant with a load of pyrite ("fools' gold") and other supposedly precious minerals, leaving behind 104 colonists, and the tiny Discovery for the use of the colonists. The Susan Constant, which had been a rental ship that had customarily been used to transport freight, did not return to Virginia again. However, Newport did return twice from England with additional supplies in the following 18 months, leading what were termed the First and Second Supply missions. Despite original intentions to grow food and trade with the Native Americans, the barely surviving colonists became dependent upon the supply missions. Before the arrival of the First Supply, over half of the colonists perished in the winter of 1607–08.

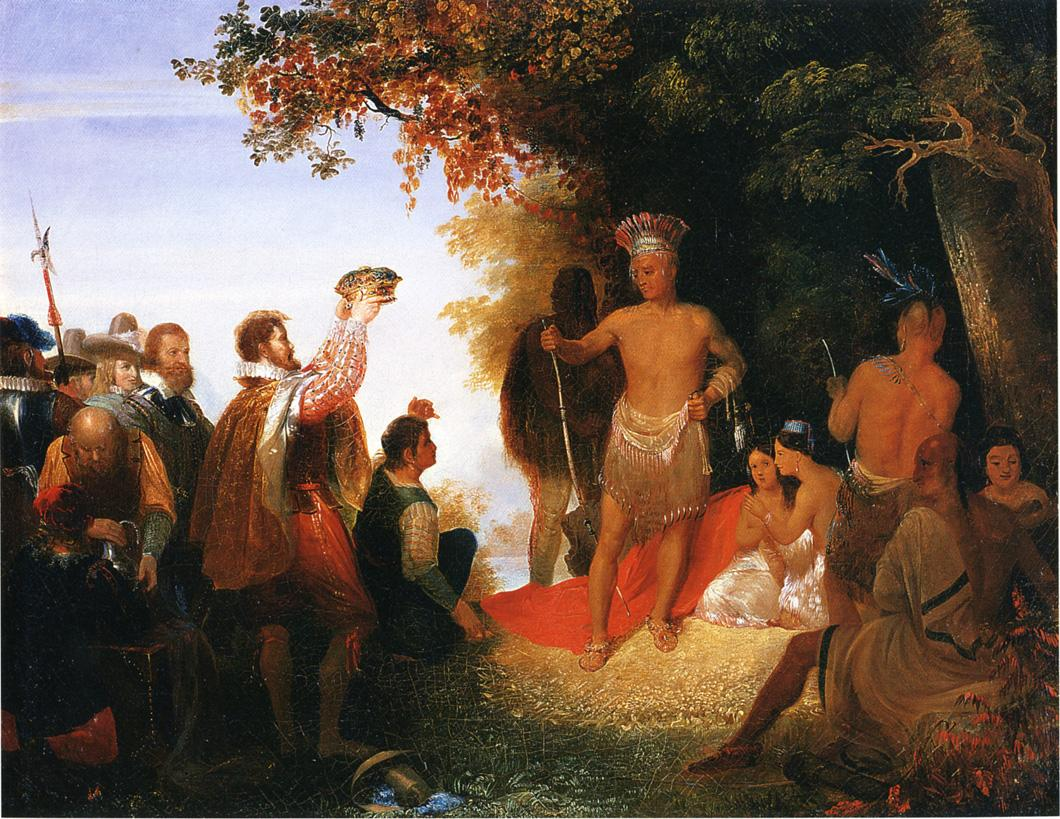
The Coronation of Powhatan, oil on canvas, John Gadsby Chapman, 1835

The urgently needed First Supply mission arrived in Jamestown on 8 January 1608. The two ships under Newport's command were the John and Francis and the Phoenix. However, despite replenishing the supplies, the two ships also brought an additional 120 men, so with the survivors of the initial group, there were now 158 colonists, as recorded later by John Smith. Accordingly, Newport left again for England almost immediately to obtain more supplies for the colonists. On this trip Newport took Powhatan's tribesman Namontack to London, arriving on 10 April 1608. Namontack remained in London for three months and then returned to Virginia with Newport.

The Second Supply arrived in September 1608, this time with Newport commanding the Mary and Margaret, a ship of about 150 tons. In addition to urgently needed supplies, the Second Supply delivered another 70 persons as well as the first two women from England, a "gentlewoman" and a woman servant. Realizing that Powhatan's friendship was crucial to the survival of the small Jamestown colony, Newport was also ordered to "crown" the chief with a ceremonial crown to make him an English "vassal." The coronation went badly however, because he stated he was already a king and refused to kneel to receive the crown. The need for another, ideally much larger, supply mission was conveyed to the leaders of the Virginia Company effectively when Newport returned to England. Additional funds and resources were gathered and readied. However, the Third Supply, as well as the company's new purpose-built flagship, the Sea Venture, were each to become big problems for Jamestown.

=== Third Supply: ill-fated Sea Venture ===
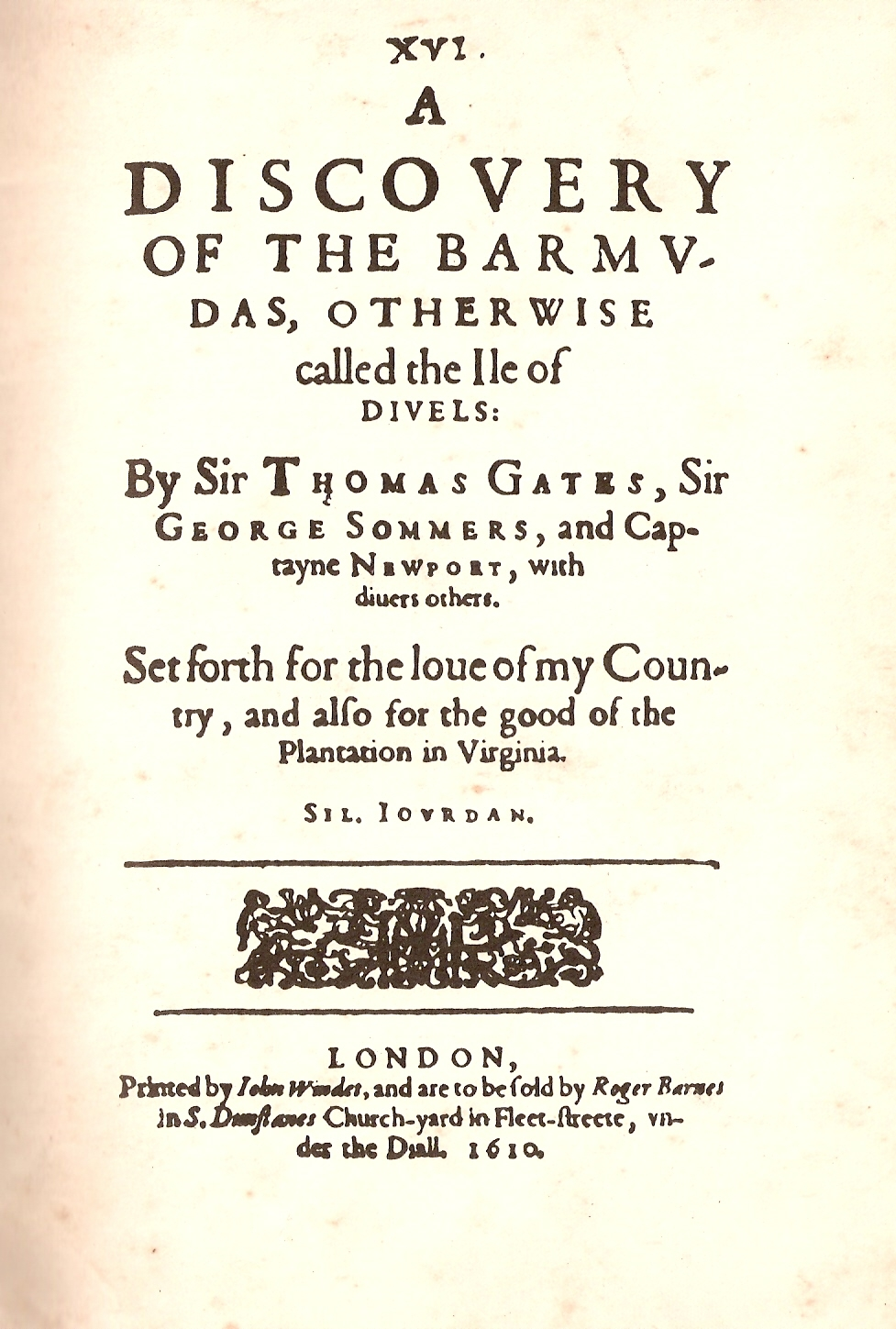
Silvester Jourdain's "A Discovery of the Barmudas"

Newport made a third trip to America in June 1609, as captain of the Sea Venture and "Vice Admiral" of the Third Supply mission. Normally, ships destined for North America from Europe sailed south as far as the Canary Islands as at that latitude the mean direction of the wind is to the West, pushing them across the Atlantic (ships returning to Europe turned eastward at the Carolinas, as at that latitude the mean wind direction is to the East), then followed the chain of west Indian islands to Florida and from there followed the Atlantic coast of the continent. However, with the West Indies firmly in the grip of the Spanish Empire, the English fleet turned Northwards in the open Atlantic, intending to bypass the Spanish threat and head directly for Virginia. Days away from Jamestown, on 24 July, the nine ships encountered a massive three-day-long storm, and became separated. The flagship of the mission, the Sea Venture, being newly built for the voyage, was leaking heavily, having lost her caulking. Admiral Sir George Somers, who had taken the helm, deliberately drove her upon a reef in Bermuda to prevent her foundering. Eventually, in May 1610, the survivors (150 colonists and crew members, and one dog) constructed two smaller ships, the Deliverance and the Patience, from the wreck and the abundant native Bermuda cedar. Arriving at Jamestown 10 months later than planned, where the death of over 80% of the colonists had occurred during the Starving Time, Newport and the others had precious few supplies to share. Both groups felt they had no alternative but to return to England. On 7 June, they boarded the ships, and started to sail downstream and abandon Jamestown. However, as they approached Mulberry Island, they were met by a 'fourth" supply mission sailing upstream headed by a new governor, Thomas West, who ordered the remaining settlers to return. He was also a part of Jamestown governing, and made Jamestown progress.

On his last voyage to Jamestown in 1610, Newport brought John Rolfe. Rolfe would engineer a new kind of tobacco that would become the key to the colony's eventual prosperity.

== Later voyages, death ==
On 12 May 1611 Newport arrived once again back at Jamestown, accompanied by Sir Thomas Dale, departing 20 August, for what would be his last time. In 1612, he joined the Royal Navy, accepting a commission first offered to him in 1606, and entered the English East India Company. In 1613, aboard the Expedition, Newport commanded the twelfth voyage of the company to the Far East. In 1615 he sailed to India. In November 1616 he wrote his will, and set out on his third voyage to the East Indies (this time accompanied by his son, also called Christopher, who joined the crew). By May 1617, he was in South Africa, but he died in Java (now part of Indonesia) sometime after 15 August 1617 of unknown causes.

== Legacy ==
- Newport, Kentucky, US was named in his honour.
- Newport News Point (where the mouth of the James River joins the harbour of Hampton Roads) and the city of Newport News, Virginia US, are believed to have been named after him, although this is disputed.
- Christopher Newport University, in Newport News, Virginia is named in honour of him.
  - In 2007, a statue commemorating Captain Newport was unveiled at his namesake University. The statue has been the subject of some controversy, as it depicts Newport with both hands, while it is historically documented that Newport lost his entire right arm in 1590. The creator of the statue says, in an interview, that we should "not remember our heroes as mutilated."
- The World War II Liberty Ship SS Christopher Newport was named in his honour.
- Captain Newport was portrayed by actors David Hemblen in Pocahontas: The Legend in 1999 and Christopher Plummer in Terrence Malick's 2005 film The New World, but did not appear in the 1995 Disney animated film or its 1998 direct-to-video sequel. In the Disney films, his role is replaced by the villainous Governor Ratcliffe.
