= John Watts (merchant) =

English merchant, Alderman and shipowner

Sir John Watts (c. 1554–1616) was an English merchant, Alderman and shipowner. He is also one of the founders of the East India Company, active in the Virginia Company and was Lord Mayor of London in 1606. He is best known for organising joint stock expeditions to the Spanish Main which were highly successful during England's long war with Spain.

== Life ==
The son of Thomas Watts of Buntingford, Hertfordshire, he was the owner of the Margaret and John, one of the ships paid by the city of London in 1588 to sail against the Spanish Armada. Watts himself served in her as a volunteer and saw action. In 1590 the same ship was one of a fleet of merchantmen coming home from the Mediterranean, which successfully fought and repelled the Spanish galleys near Cádiz, though Watts was not on board.

== Career ==
=== Joint stock expeditions ===
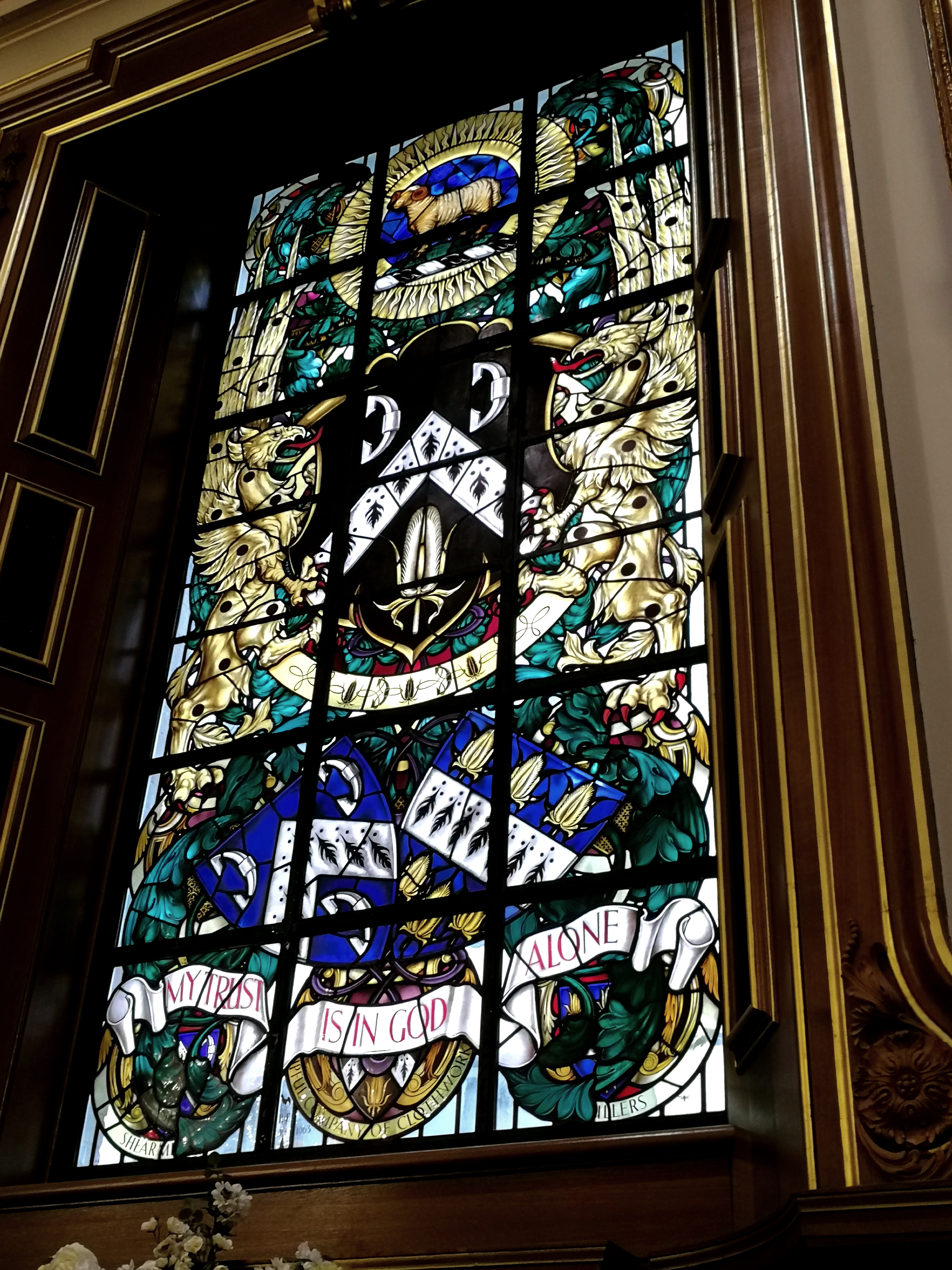
John Watts was a member of the Clothmakers Guild. Armorial window with arms of the Worshipful Company of Clothworkers, as well as its predecessors below (Shearmen's Company and Fuller's Company).

Throughout the war he equipped and financed privateers led by Michael Geare, William Lane and Christopher Newport, the Elizabethan Sea Dogs in highly lucrative joint stock expeditions. A few of his notable successes include his financed and organised expedition to the Spanish Main in 1590, the expedition to Cuba the following year and James Lancaster's expedition to Recife in April 1595. Watt's received significant prize money from the success of these expeditions. Another in July 1601 took into Plymouth a prize coming from the Indies laden with China silks, satins and taffetas. At this time he was an alderman of London (Tower ward), and had been suspected of being a supporter of Robert Devereux, 2nd Earl of Essex.

=== East India and Virginia Companies ===
He was one of the founders of the East India Company, and on 11 April 1601 was elected its governor, during the imprisonment of Sir Thomas Smythe. He served as a Sheriff of the City of London in 1597. On the accession of King James he was knighted on 26 July 1603, becoming Lord Mayor of London in 1606–1607. The Spanish ambassador however noted his displeasure in this appointment in a letter to the king of Spain, Philip III, describing Watts as "the greatest pirate that has ever been in this kingdom". During the following years he was an active member of the Virginia Company. In the city of London, Watts was a member of the Clothworkers' Company.

Watts died at his seat in Hertfordshire in September 1616, and was buried on the 7th of the month at Ware.

== Family ==
By his wife Margaret, daughter of Sir James Hawes, knt. (lord mayor in 1574), he left four sons and four daughters. The eldest son, John, served in the Cádiz expedition and was knighted for his good service in 1625; he subsequently served under George Villiers, 1st Duke of Buckingham in the Rhé expedition, and under Count Mansfeldt in the Electorate of the Palatinate; he married Mary, daughter of Thomas Bayning, and aunt of Paul Bayning, 1st Viscount Bayning, and left numerous issue. His eldest son (grandson of the lord mayor), who also became Sir John Watts, served an apprenticeship in arms under his father. He was knighted in 1642, and received a commission to raise a troop of arms for the king. Having been expelled from the governorship of Chirk Castle, he attached himself to Arthur Capell, 1st Baron Capell of Hadham, and was one of the defenders of Colchester Castle (August 1648). He compounded for delinquency by paying a fine, and was discharged on 11 May 1649; however, he was forced to sell to Sir John Buck his manor of Mardocks in Ware. After the Restoration he was made receiver for Essex and Hertfordshire. He died about 1680, and was buried in the church of Hertingfordbury.

Civic offices
Preceded by Sir Leonard Holliday	Lord Mayor of the City of London; 1606	Succeeded by Sir Henry Rowe
