= William Parker (privateer) =

English captain and privateer

William Parker (died 24 September 1618) was an English captain and privateer, and also Lord Mayor of Plymouth (English seaport town of Plymouth) in Devon, on the coast of southwest England, facing the English Channel, in the 17th century.

He was born near Plymouth and was a member of the lesser gentry but he became one of the owners of the Merchants house & in 1601 became Lord Mayor of Plymouth before becoming a privateer (and so-called Elizabethan sea dogs) in the services of Queen Elizabeth I (the Great) (1533-1603, reigned 1558-1603). In 1587, he sailed in consort with Sir Francis Drake (c.1540-1596), during Drake's raid on and battle at Cádiz, at the seaport and naval base of Cádiz in the Kingdom of Spain.

In the 1590s Captain Parker sailed the West Indies islands in the Caribbean Sea of the Americas, taking several prizes. He also plundered Puerto Cortés (in modern Honduras) in Central America in 1594 and 1595. After 1596, as owner of his own vessel, he partnered with Sir Anthony Sherley (1565-1635), but this relationship ended when after a time no prizes were taken. Leaving Captain Sherley behind, Captain Parker attacked Campeche in the Viceroyalty of New Spain (modern Mexico). Captain Parker was wounded in that attack but survived and succeeded in capturing a frigate carrying silver which was en route to San Juan de Ulua, the complex of fortresses overlooking and protecting the seaport town of Veracruz of New Spain on the western coast of the Gulf of Mexico.

Captain Parker next captured Portobello in February 1601, during the ongoing Anglo-Spanish War of 1585-1604. Portobello was a very important port being the departure point from which Peruvian treasure fleets left to cross the Atlantic for European Spain. Captain Parker then sailed to Panama and plundered Saint Vincent in the Cape Verde Islands. He also captured and held for ransom the Cubagua pearl-boats and captured a Portuguese slave ship. His successes secured for him a prominent mercantile and later political position in Plymouth, where he was looked upon as a hero of sorts and elected Lord Mayor of the major seaport English town in 1601.

He became a founding member of the Virginia Company, organized in London in 1606, which sent expeditions across the Atlantic Ocean beginning in 1607 to found the Colony of Virginia (modern U.S. state of the Commonwealth of Virginia) and the first settlement of Jamestown on the north bank of the James River, upstream inland from the Chesapeake Bay in the future Thirteen Colonies of English America / British America on the East Coast of the North America continent, building up the beginnings there of the four-hundred years old British Empire

Captain Parker was made Vice-Admiral of the English Royal Navy and left on an expedition to the East Indies islands (between the Indian and Pacific Oceans, off the coast of Southeast Asia) on the other side of the world, but died on the voyage to Bantam (a seaport town on the island of Java in the former Banten Sultanate, later in the colony of the Dutch East Indies now the modern Indonesia) on 14 September 1618.
