= Cabo Corrientes, Cuba =

Cape in Pinar del Río Province, Cuba

Cabo Corrientes
- Cape
- Cuban striped curly-tailed lizard (Leiocephalus stictigaster) on the cape

- Location within Cuba
- Coordinates: 21.759720°N 84.510447°W
- Water bodies: Caribbean sea

Cabo Corrientes is a cape on the Guanahacabibes Peninsula in Pinar del Río Province, in the west of Cuba. It is covered by a protected nature reserve. The cape has been the scene of various pirate encounters and shipwrecks. During World War II (1939–1945) several ships were sunk near the cape. There is a hotel for researchers and ecotourists or scuba divers.

== Location ==
The cape extends from the south of the Guanahacabibes Peninsula, to the east of the Bahia de Corrientes. It is covered in dense forest and jagged rocks. A road runs along the bay to the village of Maria la Gorda. Since 1963 the cape has been strictly protected by the Cabo Corrientes Nature Reserve, which since 2001 has been part of the 39,901 hectares (98,600 acres) Guanahacabibes National Park, in turn part of the 121,572 hectares (300,410 acres) Peninsula de Guanahacabibes Biosphere Reserve. The cape is brushed or hit by a tropical storm on average every 2.27 years, and hit by hurricane-force winds every 5.58 years.

== History ==
The peninsula was one of the last places of refuge for indigenous people who escaped from the Spanish, and has almost 140 archeological sites.

In early 1591 an English fleet had been organised for a raiding expedition to the Spanish West Indies, which became known as the Blockade of Western Cuba or Watts' West Indies Expedition. The English took up position near Cabo Corrientes in mid June 1591 to await the arrival of Spanish ships. On 23 June Burr, Hopewell, Swallow and Content arrived between Cape Corrientes and Cape San Antonio and soon sighted six sail. Hoping these were treasure ships, the English closed, only to discover the ships were a powerful Spanish naval force. A three-hour engagement followed after which the English formation scattered.

On 29 June Hopewell and Swallow returned to Cape Corrientes to find no sign of any Spanish ships. On 3 July while part of the formation was watering inshore off Corrientes, Pegasus and Centaur caught sight of a number of Spanish ships. After a quick pursuit they overhauled and captured the 150 ton Spanish armed merchantmen Santa Catalina under Captain Martín Francisco de Armendáriz and the 100 ton escorting frigata Regalo de Dios. At the same time the other escorting frigata was trapped and captured by Lion and Swallow. The Spanish ships had been bound from Santo Domingo to Havana carrying valuables which included precious stones and hides. On 5 July, the English agreed to all sail together with their prizes until they passed the Cuban capital.

The Preston Somers Expedition reached Cabo Corrientes on the 22 July 1595, and there decided to perform a short blockade off Havana in the attempt to make a few small prizes. There is a story that the treasures of the Catedral de Mérida were buried somewhere on the cape in the mid-17th century. Two men, one at the end of the 19th century and the other around 1930 are said to have each returned from the cape with a handful of gold, claiming they had found the buried treasure. Both died before they could return to excavate the treasure. People continue to search for the trove.

Very few people live on the cape apart from a few scientists studying the environment and some ecotourists. There is a hotel in Maria la Gorda that may be used by scuba divers.

== Shipwrecks ==
Date	Ship	Country	Description
16 September 1821	Devon	United Kingdom	The ship was wrecked on a reef off Cabo Corrientes. Her crew survived. She was on a voyage from Jamaica to Cork.
1 June 1824	Reparateur	France	The ship was lost near Cabo Corrientes. She was on a voyage from St. Jago de Cuba to Bordeaux, Gironde.
1 June 1824	Eclipse	United Kingdom	The ship was wrecked near Cape Corrientes with the loss of five of her crew. She was on a voyage from Jamaica to London.
21 April 1827	Briton	United Kingdom	The ship was wrecked on Cabo Corrientes. Her crew were rescued. She was on a voyage from Jamaica to London.
8 December 1940	Idarwald	Germany	HMS Diomede chased the German blockade runner Idarwald from Tampico, Mexico. Before a capture could be effected the crew of the German freighter set it afire and scuttled it off Cabo Corrientes. The US destroyer USS Sturtevant observed the proceedings.
18 May 1942	SS Mercury Sun	United States	World War II: The tanker was torpedoed and sunk in the Caribbean Sea 125 nautical miles (232 km) south of Cabo Corrientes by German submarine U-125 with the loss of six of her 35 crew. Survivors were rescued by SS Howard.
21 May 1942	Elizabeth	United States	World War II: The cargo ship was torpedoed and sunk in the Caribbean Sea 30 nautical miles (56 km) south of Cabo Corrientes by German submarine U-103 with the loss of six of her 42 crew.
23 May 1942	Samuel Q. Brown	United States	World War II: The tanker was torpedoed and damaged in the Caribbean Sea 100 nautical miles (190 km) south of Cabo Corrientes) by German submarine U-103 with the loss of two of her 55 crew. Five injured crew were rescued by a United States Navy aircraft based at Upham, Canal Zone. the rest of the survivors were rescued on 25 May by USS Goff, which scuttled the ship.
2 June 1942	SS Knoxville City	United Kingdom	World War II: The cargo ship was torpedoed and sunk in the Caribbean Sea 50 nautical miles (93 km) south east of Cabo Corrientes by German submarine U-158 with the loss of two of her 55 crew.

== Sources ==
- Andrews, Kenneth R (1959), English Privateering Voyages to the West Indies 1588-1595, Kraus, ISBN 978-0811504027
- Andrews, Kenneth (1984), Trade, Plunder and Settlement: Maritime Enterprise and the Genesis of the British Empire, 1480–1630, Cambridge University Press, ISBN 978-0521276986
- "Cabo Corrientes Cuba's history with tropical systems", hurricanecity.com
- "Guanahacabibes", cubacasas.net
- "Hotels in Guanahacabibes Peninsula, Pinar Del Rio, Cuba", cubaism.ca, Nigel Hunt
- Knoxville City, Uboat
- "La Península de Guanahacabibes, la gran reserva natural de Cuba abierta al ecoturismo", Cubaconecta (in Spanish), 12 May 2017
- "Lloyds's Marine List - Nov. 30", Caledonian Mercury 15640, 3 December 1821
- "Lloyds's Marine List - July 20", Caledonian Mercury 16060, 24 July 1824
- "Loss of the Ship Eclipse, Capt. Hearn", The Morning Chronicle, no. 17299, 27 September 1824
- Marley, David (2008), Wars of the Americas: A Chronology of Armed Conflict in the Western Hemisphere, ABC CLLO, ISBN 978-1598841008
- Quinn, David B (1985), Set Fair for Roanoke: Voyages and Colonies 1584–1606, America's Four Hundredth Anniversary Committee, ISBN 9780807816066
- Ronald Suárez Rivas (22 February 2017), "Miguel and the legend of buried treasure", granma, Communist Party of Cuba Central Committee
