= Battle of Puerto Caballos (1603) =

1603 battle

- Part of the Anglo–Spanish War
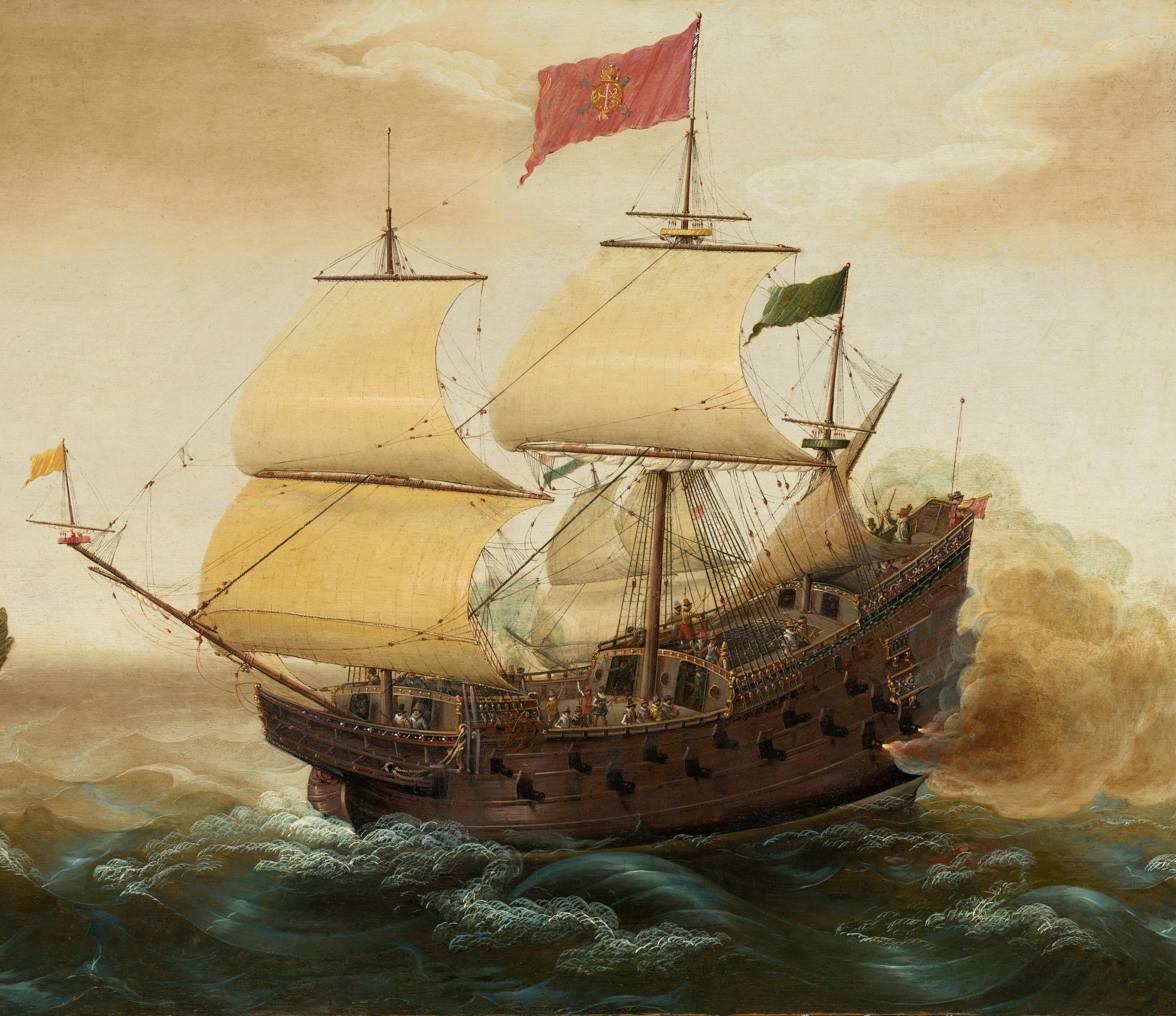
- A Spanish galleon similar to the one Newport captured at Puerto Caballos
Date	17 February 1603
Location	Off Puerto Caballos, Royal Audiencia of Guatemala (Present-day Honduras)
Result	Anglo-French victory

Belligerents
Spain	England; French privateers

Commanders and leaders
Juan de Monasterio	Christopher Newport; Michael Geare

Strength
2 galleons, 100 militia onshore	8 ships, 400 men

Casualties and losses
Fortress destroyed 1 galleon burnt 1 galleon captured 2 merchant ships captured 30 killed, 200 captured	30 casualties

The Battle of Puerto Caballos was a military event during the Anglo–Spanish War to capture the Spanish town and port of Puerto Caballos (present-day Puerto Cortés, Honduras) on 17 February 1603 by an English fleet under Christopher Newport and Michael Geare. The English were able to achieve victory after a bitter fight. Two Spanish galleons were captured, one of which was subsequently burned. The Anglo-French consortium occupied the area and after two weeks withdrew with captured booty.

== Background ==
Throughout the Anglo-Spanish war English privateers harassed Spanish shipping. These were mainly London merchants who, in a grinding war of attrition, were able to roam the coast of the Spanish New World. In charge of one of these expeditions was veteran Christopher Newport, who had been in the Caribbean since 1602. He had lost his arm during a successful expedition in 1590 but this did not stop him from fighting.

In November 1602, at the smuggling outpost of Tortuga off the coast of northern Hispaniola, Newport had teamed up with Captain Michael Geare (another veteran of raiding the Spanish Main) who had teamed up with three French slavers to attack a pair of Spanish galleons expected soon at Puerto Caballos (modern-day Puerto Cortés, Honduras). The 300- to 350-ton English vessels – Archangel of Geare, Newport's Neptune, and Anthony Hippons in Paul Bayning's ship Phoenix—were joined by Spanish prizes to increase their fleet's size to eight.

Newport had successfully raided Puerto Caballos before, in May 1592, when he captured a 200-ton merchantmen. He knew the area well but the fleet needed supplies badly so it headed first for Jamaica. On 24 January 1603, while heading for Puerto Caballos, the Anglo-French flotilla raided Jamaica. The Spanish repelled the attack. Newport and his associates withdrew with minor losses.

== Engagement ==
In the dark on 17 February the English ships followed by the French slavers reached the port of Puerto Caballos and detached seven boats with 200 men and light artillery. They hoped to board the two partially laden Spanish galleons at anchor in the roads rather than destroy them. The galleons were Captain Juan de Monasterios's 600-ton Nuestra Señora del Rosario and Francisco Ferrufino's 400-ton San Juan Bautista. These were the flagship and vice flagship of the flota of New Spain. At almost sunrise the attackers rowed towards the galleons hoping to use surprise, but it was not to be. Warning shots were fired, but soon the English and French boarded both the galleons.

The Spanish put up a stout resistance and managed to repel the attackers for a number of hours, but Newport's Neptune and Geare's Archangel soon came and used their cannons to full effect in support of the attack. Both sides were near exhaustion but the English finally took the Nuestra Señora del Rosario. With that the San Juan Bautista, seeing the position was hopeless, surrendered not long after. To prevent a Spanish counterattack Newport immediately ordered an attack on the port itself. After a short fight the Spanish soon fled the town and after nearly eight hours the battle was over. The casualties on both sides were roughly the same—around 30—but the Spanish had surrendered nearly 200 men, of which the majority consisted of the ships' complements.

=== Occupation ===
The triumphant English and French then looted the vessels and buildings ashore for the next eighteen days as well as the two galleons they seized from two merchant vessels. The loot was considerable—200 sacks of anil (dye), 3,000 hides, and the artillery of the two captured galleons, together with the miscellaneous goods from the town. The Rosario was considerably damaged from the battering it had suffered from Nepture and Archangel in supporting the final attack. Newport decided to burn her as she was too damaged to be towed away, leaving the prize goods to be carried in the Bautista.

There were arguments between the English and the French during their occupation of the town, not to do with the spoils but with regards to the Spanish prisoners. Spanish eyewitnesses later declare that the French wished to kill them all, with the English refusing to do so. Newport remained defiant. The English got their way and spared the prisoners, but it did not stop the French from killing a number. In the last days of occupation Newport set them free a number at a time and also made ransoms. The local fortress, San Felipe castle, was demolished by the occupiers.

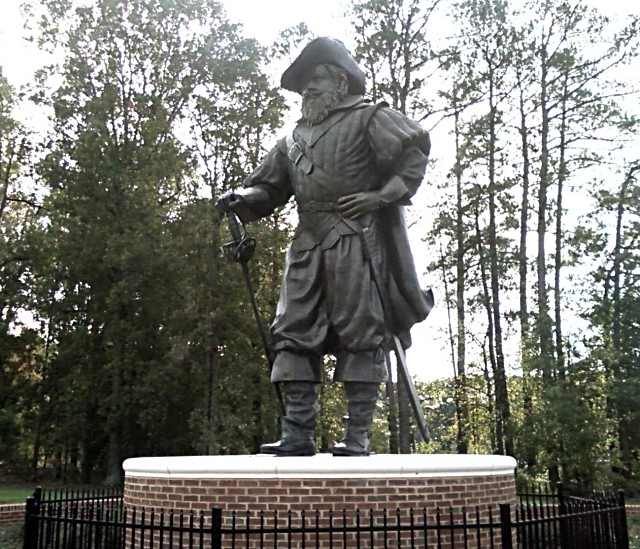
A statue of Christopher Newport at the Christopher Newport University

== Aftermath ==
Eventually, both groups departed with San Juan Bautista as their sole prize, Rosario being left behind a stripped and burnt hulk. The French headed back to Hispaniola while the English steered downwind towards Cuba. Puerto Caballos had been raided a number of times, but after suffering its biggest attack was left devastated and never fully recovered.

Geare and Newport stayed in the Caribbean until May and took a number of Spanish prizes near Havana. In that same month they safely sailed back to England. Newport used the money from the prizes he had captured to help set up the Virginia Company; he would return to the Americas again not to pillage but to lead (with John Smith, John Rolfe, and George Somers) in the foundation of the first permanent English colony of Jamestown. This was one of the last raids on the Spanish Main. Following Elizabeth I's death in March and the accession of James I - English privateering ceased. This was a precursor to the Treaty of London between England and Spain the following year.
