= William Lane (died 1618) =

English politician

William Lane (c. 1553 – 12 May 1618) was an English politician. He was the eldest son of Robert Lane and Katherine Copley.

Lane took part in the blockade of Western Cuba in June and July 1591 as captain of the 120-ton Centaur, an expedition financed by John Watts. He was a Member (MP) of the Parliament of England for Gatton in 1593 and for Northamptonshire in 1601 in the seat previously held by his father.
