= Spanish Main =

Spanish Empire holdings in the Americas

- Region of Spanish Empire
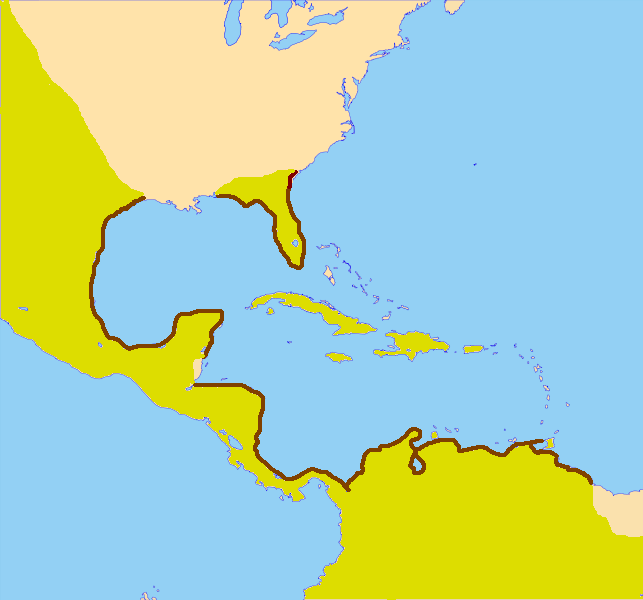
- Spanish possessions (yellow) in the Caribbean region around 1650, with the coastline of the Spanish Main indicated (thick maroon line).

During the Spanish colonization of the Americas, the Spanish Main (Spanish: Tierra Firme) comprised the parts of the Spanish Empire that were on the mainland of the Americas and had coastlines on the Caribbean Sea or Gulf of Mexico. The term was used by English speakers to distinguish those regions from the numerous islands Spain controlled in the Caribbean, which were known as the Spanish West Indies.

== Etymology ==
The word main in the expression is a contraction of mainland.

== Composition ==
The Spanish Main included Spanish Florida and New Spain, the latter extending through modern-day Texas, Mexico, all of Central America, to Colombia and Venezuela on the north coast of South America. Major ports along this stretch of coastline included Veracruz, Porto Bello, Cartagena de Indias and Maracaibo.

The term is sometimes used in a more restricted sense that excludes the territories on the Gulf of Mexico. The Spanish Main then encompassed the Caribbean coastline from the Isthmus of Darien in Panama to the Orinoco delta on the coast of Venezuela. In this sense, the Spanish Main roughly coincides with the 16th century Province of Tierra Firme (Spanish for "mainland province").

== Economic importance and piracy ==
A Bermuda sloop on the Spanish Main, circa 1807

From the 16th to the early 19th century, enormous wealth was shipped from the Spanish Main to Spain in the form of gold, silver, gemstones, spices, hardwoods, hides and other valuable goods. Much of the wealth was silver in the form of pieces of eight, from the mines near Potosí. It was carried to the Spanish Main by llama and mule trains via the Pacific coast. Other goods originated in the Far East, having been carried to the Pacific coast of Spain's possessions on the Manila galleons, often through the port of Acapulco, then transported overland to the Spanish Main for onward shipment to Europe.

The Spanish Main became a frequent target for pirates, buccaneers, privateers and countries at war with Spain, seeking to capture some of these riches. To protect this wealth, the Spanish treasure fleet was equipped with heavily armed galleons. The organization of the fleets in large convoys proved highly successful, with only a few successful examples of major privateer attacks along the Spanish Main, such as the capture of Cartagena de Indias by Francis Drake in 1586; the capture of a Spanish treasure fleet sailing from Mexico by the Dutch West India Company in 1628; the capture of Chagres and Panama City by Henry Morgan in 1670–71; and the Raid on Cartagena by the French in 1697. Pirates operating in the area included the Dutchman Laurens de Graaf, who raided Veracruz in 1683 and Cartagena in 1697.

== See also ==
- History of the Caribbean
- Piracy in the Caribbean
