= 1595 =

1595 in various calendars
- Gregorian calendar: 1595; MDXCV
- Ab urbe condita: 2348
- Armenian calendar: 1044; ԹՎ ՌԽԴ
- Assyrian calendar: 6345
- Balinese saka calendar: 1516–1517
- Bengali calendar: 1001–1002
- Berber calendar: 2545
- English Regnal year: 37 Eliz. 1 – 38 Eliz. 1
- Buddhist calendar: 2139
- Burmese calendar: 957
- Byzantine calendar: 7103–7104
- Chinese calendar: 甲午年 (Wood Horse); 4292 or 4085 — to — 乙未年 (Wood Goat); 4293 or 4086
- Coptic calendar: 1311–1312
- Discordian calendar: 2761
- Ethiopian calendar: 1587–1588
- Hebrew calendar: 5355–5356
- Hindu calendars
- Vikram Samvat: 1651–1652
- Shaka Samvat: 1516–1517
- Kali Yuga: 4695–4696
- Holocene calendar: 11595
- Igbo calendar: 595–596
- Iranian calendar: 973–974
- Islamic calendar: 1003–1004
- Japanese calendar: Bunroku 4 (文禄４年)
- Javanese calendar: 1515–1516
- Julian calendar: Gregorian minus 10 days
- Korean calendar: 3928
- Minguo calendar: 317 before ROC 民前317年
- Nanakshahi calendar: 127
- Thai solar calendar: 2137–2138
- Tibetan calendar: ཤིང་ཕོ་རྟ་ལོ་ (male Wood-Horse); 1721 or 1340 or 568 — to — ཤིང་མོ་ལུག་ལོ་ (female Wood-Sheep); 1722 or 1341 or 569

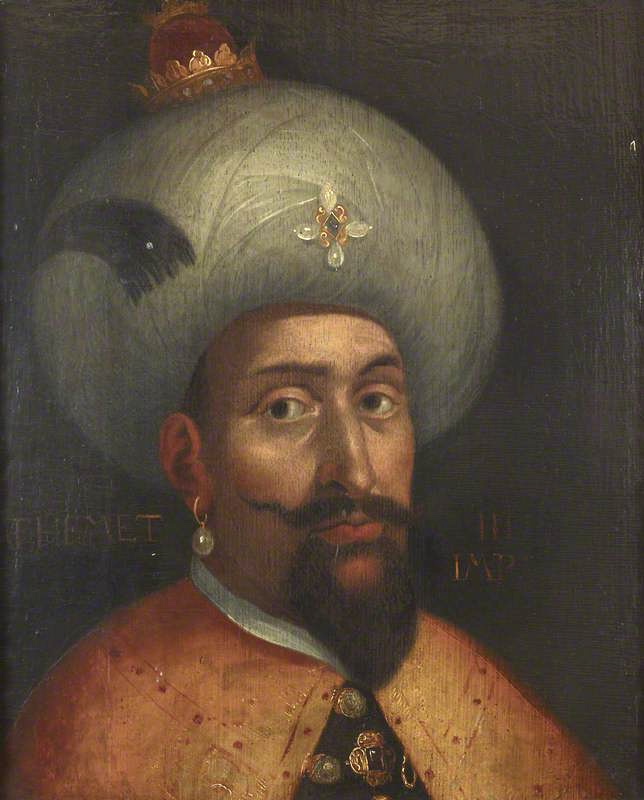
January 16: Sultan Mehmed III orders all of his brothers strangled upon becoming the new Ottoman ruler

1595 (MDXCV) was a common year starting on Sunday of the Gregorian calendar and a common year starting on Wednesday of the Julian calendar, the 1595th year of the Common Era (CE) and Anno Domini (AD) designations, the 595th year of the 2nd millennium, the 95th year of the 16th century, and the 6th year of the 1590s decade. As of the start of 1595, the Gregorian calendar was 10 days ahead of the Julian calendar, which remained in localized use until 1923.

== Events ==
=== January–March ===
- January 16 – Mehmed III succeeds Murad III, as Sultan of the Ottoman Empire and begins a reign of almost nine years. Upon ascending the throne, Mehmed orders that all 19 of the other sons of Murad III are to be strangled to death.
- January 17 – During the French Wars of Religion, King Henry IV of France declares war on Spain, ordering Henry, Duke of Bouillon to lead armies through Luxembourg for an attack on the Spanish Netherlands (now Belgium).
- January 24 – Matthias of Habsburg is appointed by his brother Rudolf II, Holy Roman Emperor, to become the Archduke of die Vorlande, the possessions of the Austrian Habsburgs in Southern Germany outside of Austria, also called Further Austria (Vorderösterreich). The appointment follows the death of their uncle, Ferdinand II. Matthias will later become Archduke of Austria (in 1608) and the Emperor in 1612.
- January 28 – The Principality of Transylvania (now encompassing most of Romania) joins the Holy League alliance with the Holy Roman Empire in a war against the Ottoman Empire, as Stephen Bocskai signs a treaty at Prague on behalf of Prince Sigismund Báthory.
- February 6
  - Sir Walter Raleigh of England departs from Plymouth to begin an expedition to South America
  - Despite a string of military victories over the Serbian rebels, Koca Sinan Pasha is dismissed as Grand Vizier of the Ottoman Empire by Sultan Mehmed III, and banished to Malkara. He is replaced by Serdar Ferhad Pasha, whom he replaces on July 7.
- February 16 – In northern Ireland, Art MacBaron O'Neill successfully conducts the assault on the Blackwater Fort, an English military outpost located in County Armagh and captures it.
- February 20 – Archduke Ernest of Austria, Governor-General of the Habsburg Netherlands (now Belgium), dies at the age of 41 and is temporarily replaced by his Spanish assistant, Pedro Henriquez de Acevedo, Count of Fuentes.
- February 25 – The Goa state archives are established at the city of Panaji in Portuguese India (now India's Goa state) by historian Diogo do Couto.
- March 20 – After a siege of 13 days, the French town of Huy (now in Belgium) is captured by the army of the Spanish Netherlands, as the General Charles de Héraugière surrenders to the Baron de la Motte.
- March 26 – Thado Dhamma Yaza III, who has served since 1589 for the Kingdom of Pegu as the Burmese Viceroy of Prome (now in the Bago Region of Myanmar), declares himself to be the King of Prome during the invasion by the Kingdom of Siam and breaks relations with his father King Nanda Bayin of Pegu.

=== April–June ===
- April 8 (March 29 O.S.) – Combined Taungoo–Lan Na armies break the rebel Thado Dhamma Yaza's siege of Taungoo, in modern-day Myanmar.
- April 15 – Sir Walter Raleigh travels up the Orinoco River, in search of the fabled city of El Dorado.
- May 18 – The Treaty of Teusina brings to an end the Russo-Swedish War (1590–95).
- May 24 – The Nomenclator of Leiden University Library appears, the first printed catalog of an institutional library.
- May 29 – George Somers and Amyas Preston travel to aid Raleigh's El Dorado expedition but failing to meet him instead raid the Spanish Province of Venezuela
- June 9 – Battle of Fontaine-Française: Henry IV of France defeats the Spanish, but is nearly killed due to his rashness.

=== July–September ===
- July 21 – A Spanish expedition of four ships, led by navigator and explorer Álvaro de Mendaña de Neira, makes the first European landing in Polynesia, on the Marquesas Islands. Despite an initially good reception with the natives, fighting begins and the Mendaña ships leave after two weeks. One of the ships, the Santa Ysabel, disappears during the voyage toward the Solomon Islands.
- July 23 – The Spanish raid Cornwall, England.
- August 23 – Battle of Calugareni: The Wallachians, led by Michael the Brave, accomplish a great tactical victory against a vast army of Turks, led by Sinan Pasha.
- August 28 – Sir Francis Drake and Sir John Hawkins depart from England, on their final voyage to the Spanish Main, which ends in both of their deaths.
- September 2 – Battle of the Lippe (Eighty Years' War): Spanish cavalry, led by Cristóbal de Mondragón (aged over 80), defeat combined forces of the Dutch Republic and England led by Philip of Nassau (who dies of wounds received), on the banks of the river Lippe in Germany.
- September 8 – The first European colony in the South Seas is established as Spanish explorer Álvaro de Mendaña claims Nendö Island (one of the Solomon Islands) and claims it for Spain as the colony of Santa Cruz. Malaria, a mutiny of some of the Spanish soldiers, and a fight with the indigenous people kills 47 of the settlers, including Mendaña on October 18.

=== October–December ===
- October 26 – Battle of Giurgiu: Michael the Brave, led by Transylvanian Prince Sigismund Báthory, again defeats the Turkish army led by Sinan Pasha, pushing them on the east side of the Danube.
- October 30 – The surviving members of Spain's Mendaña expedition to Santa Cruz, including Mendaña's widow Isabel Barreto, decide to abandon the Santa Cruz colony in the South Pacific.
- November 7 – Portuguese explorer Sebastião Rodrigues Soromenho, who had departed from the Philippines on the ship San Agustin on July 5 with cargo of Asian silk, porcelain, and almost 100 passengers and crew, drops anchor at Drakes Bay in what is now the U.S. state of California. He and some of his crew come ashore, where they are greeted by Native Americans. A gale in a few weeks later sinks the San Agustin, killing at least 7 people and ruining the ship's cargo. The crew salvages a launch that they had brought with them.
- November 8 – The Battle of Guadalupe Island is fought between nine English Navy warships (led by Sir Francis Drake) and eight Spanish frigates off in the North Atlantic Ocean. The Spanish force wins the battle, capturing one ship and killing 45 English sailors. Both sets of ships proceed toward Puerto Rico.
- November 9 – In India, Prince Man Singh I, Maharaja of Amber within the Mughal Empire, becomes the Mughal Governor (subahdar) of Bengal in what is now Bangladesh and the Indian state of West Bengal. He lays the foundations of a new capital of Bengal, Akbarnagar (now Rajmahal, Jharkhand state).
- November 17 – In the remodeling of the Church of Saint Sylvester in Rome, the ashes of Pope Anterus are discovered almost 1,360 years after his death. Anterus had served as Pope for six weeks before dying on January 3, 236.
- November 18 – The settlers of the first attempt to create a European colony in the South Pacific depart from Santa Cruz Island on three surviving ships, the San Geronimo, the San Felipe and the Santa Catalina (which disappears during the attempt to return home). Despite the lack of navigation charts, navigator Pedro Fernandes de Queirós brings the San Geronimo and the San Felipe back to Manila Bay, arriving on February 11 after 12 weeks and the deaths of 50 passengers.
- November 22 – The Battle of San Juan is fought off of the island of Puerto Rico as an English fleet of 27 ships and 2,500 men, led by Francis Drake, attempts to invade the Spanish colony. In a three-day battle, the English lose at least eight ships and 400 men, including Admiral John Hawkins. Drake's fleet withdraws and attempts to conquer Panama.
- December 8 – A group of 80 people from the sunken ship San Agustin, are able to leave California on the launch which they had brought along, which they name the San Buenaventura. The group sails past San Francisco Bay and arrives at Chacala in Mexico on January 17.
- December 9 – What is probably the first performance of William Shakespeare's play, Richard II, takes place in London.
- December 14 – Sultan Murad, 4th son of Emperor Akbar of the Mughal Empire invades Ahmednagar Sultanate which is defended by Chand Bibi.

=== Date unknown ===
- The Austrians incite a rebellion against the Ottomans in Bulgaria.
- The Riksdag of the Estates at Söderköping in Sweden elects the Lutheran Duke Charles as the country's regent, in place of Sigismund III Vasa, King of Poland and Sweden.
- Probable first performance of William Shakespeare's plays Romeo and Juliet and A Midsummer Night's Dream in London.
- Many sugar plantations in São Tomé are destroyed by a large slave uprising

== Births ==
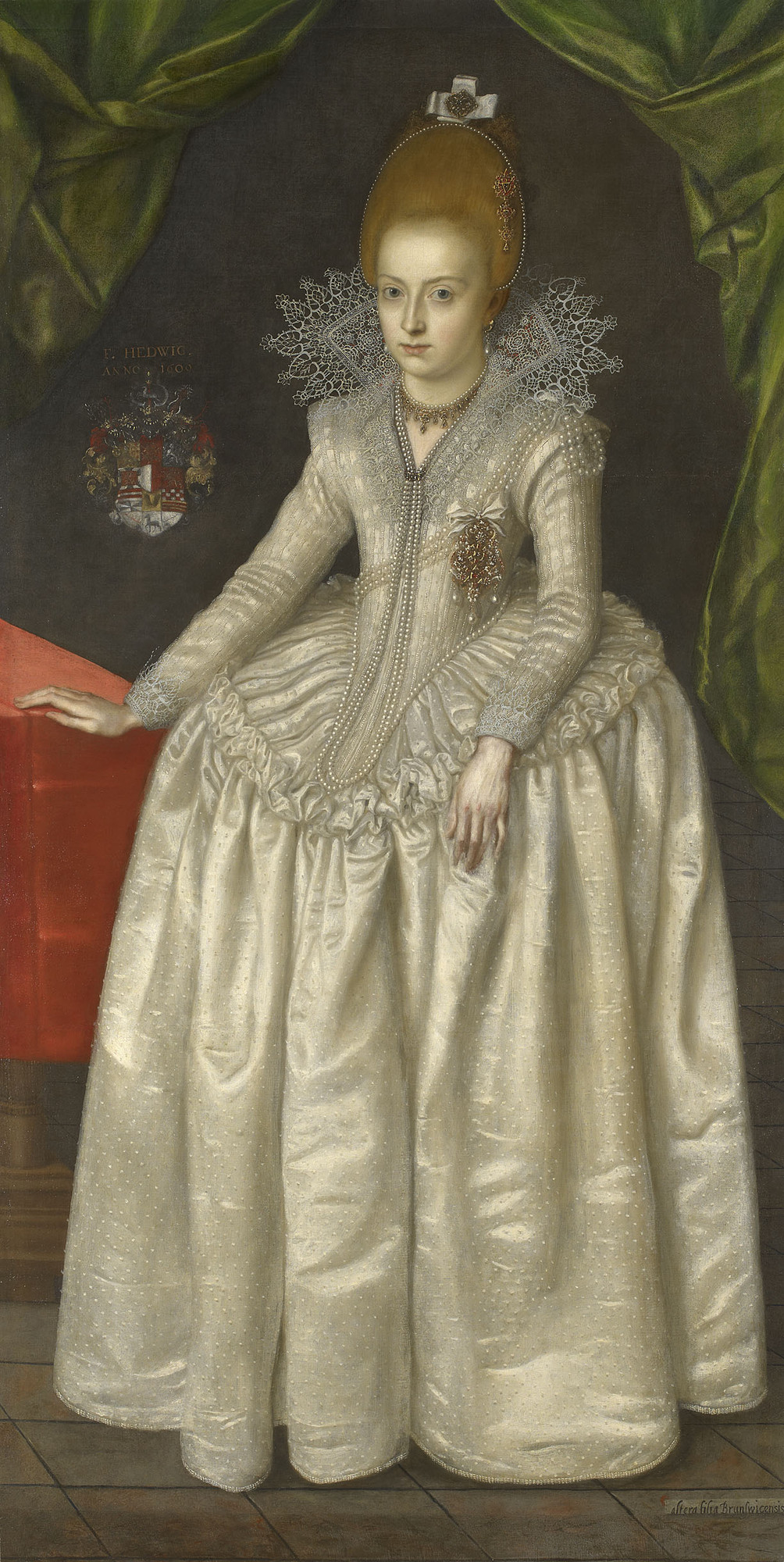
Hedwig of Brunswick-Wolfenbüttel

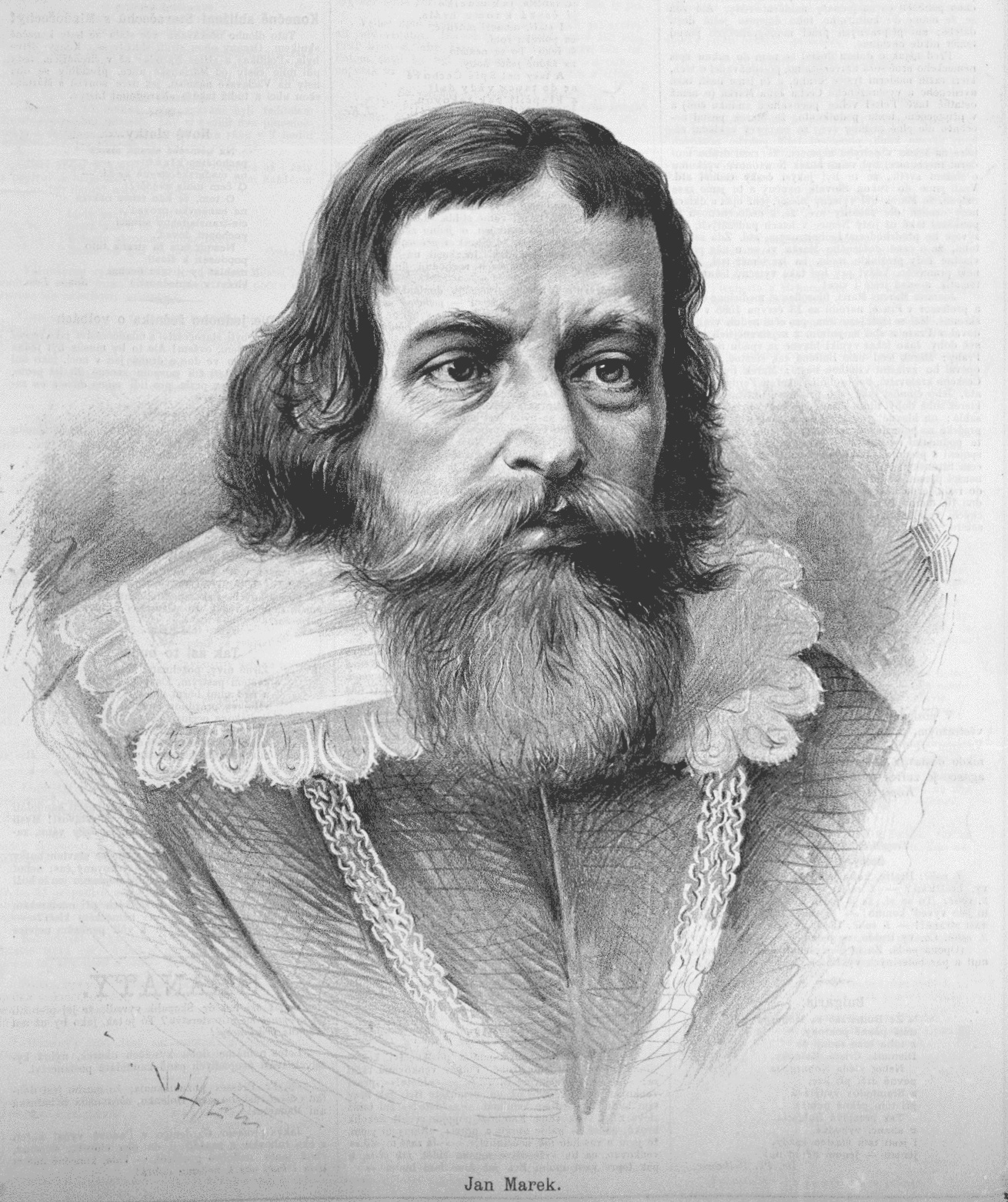
Jan Marek Marci

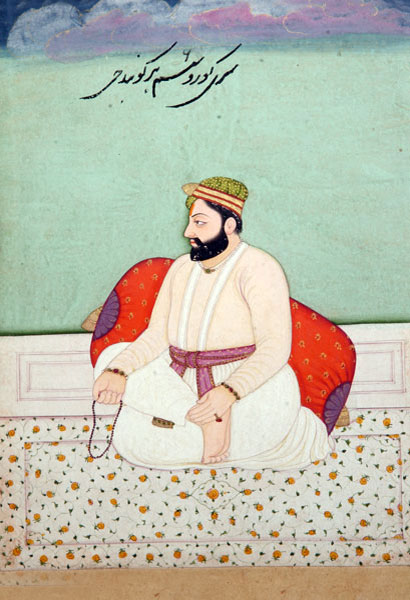
Guru Hargobind

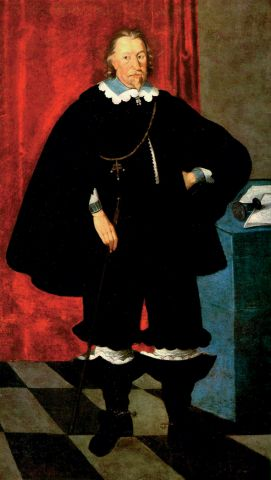
Albrycht Stanisław Radziwiłł

=== January–June ===
- January 15 – Henry Carey, 2nd Earl of Monmouth, English politician (d. 1661)
- January 22 – George Rudolf of Liegnitz, Polish noble (d. 1653)
- January 23 – Herman Fortunatus, Margrave of Baden-Rodemachern (d. 1665)
- February 9 – Hedwig of Brunswick-Wolfenbüttel, Duchess consort of Pomerania (d. 1650)
- March 19 – Carlo de' Medici, Italian Catholic cardinal (d. 1666)
- March 21 – Ferdinando Ughelli, Italian Cistercian monk and church historian (d. 1670)
- March 23 – Bevil Grenville, English royalist soldier (d. 1643)
- April 5 – John Wilson, English composer (d. 1674)
- April 6
  - Henri II d'Orléans, Duke of Longueville, Prince of France (d. 1663)
  - Pieter de Molijn, Dutch painter (d. 1661)
- April 12 – Miles Hobart, English politician (d. 1632)
- April 30
  - Anne Lykke, Danish noble (d. 1641)
  - Henri II de Montmorency, French nobleman and military commander (d. 1632)
- May 1 – Lars Kagg, Swedish count and military Officer (d. 1661)
- May 3 – Aloysius Gottifredi, Italian Jesuit (d. 1652)
- June 9 – King Wladislaus IV of Poland (d. 1648)
- June 10 – Aegidius Gelenius, German heraldist (d. 1656)
- June 13
  - John Holles, 2nd Earl of Clare, English politician and Earl (d. 1666)
  - Jan Marek Marci, Bohemian physician and scientist (d. 1667)
- June 19 – Guru Har Gobind, the Sixth Sikh Guru (d. 1644)
- June 24 – Ulderico Carpegna, Italian Catholic cardinal (d. 1679)

=== July–December ===
- July 1 – Albrycht Stanisław Radziwiłł, Polish nobleman (d. 1656)
- July 3 – John Gurdon, English politician (d. 1679)
- July 4 – Félix Castello, Spanish artist (d. 1651)
- July 9 – Anna Amalia of Baden-Durlach, Regent of Nassau-Saarbrücken (d. 1651)
- July 10 – Charles Drelincourt, French Protestant divine (d. 1669)
- July 31 – Philipp Wolfgang, Count of Hanau-Lichtenberg (d. 1641)
- August 29 – Joachim Ernest, Duke of Schleswig-Holstein-Sonderburg-Plön (1622–1671) (d. 1671)
- August 31 – Georges Fournier, French Jesuit mathematician and geographer (d. 1652)
- October 18 – Lucas van Uden, Dutch painter (d. 1672)
- October 30 – Gaj Singh of Marwar, Raja of Marwar Kingdom (r (d. 1638)
- November 11 – Martin Bauzer, Gorizian Jesuit priest and writer (d. 1668)
- November 13 – George William, Elector of Brandenburg (d. 1640)
- November 18
  - Niklaus Dachselhofer, Swiss politician (d. 1670)
  - Pietro Desani, Italian painter (d. 1647)
- December 1 – Robert Sidney, 2nd Earl of Leicester, English politician (d. 1677)
- December 3 – Henry Ley, 2nd Earl of Marlborough, English politician (d. 1638)
- December 4 – Jean Chapelain, French poet and critic during the Grand Siècle (d. 1674)
- December 5 – Henry Lawes, English musician and composer (d. 1662)
- December 7 – Injo of Joseon, sixteenth king of the Joseon dynasty in Korea (d. 1649)
- December 11 – Hŏ Mok, Korean politician, poet and scholar (d. 1682)
- December 14 – Arthur Wilson, English writer (d. 1652)
- December 27 – Bohdan Khmelnytsky, hetman of Ukraine (d. 1657)

=== Date unknown ===
- Thomas Carew, English poet (d. 1645)
- Miles Corbet, English Puritan politician (d. 1662)
- Jean Desmarets, French writer (d. 1676)
- Henry Herbert, English official (d. 1673)
- Lars Kagg, Swedish soldier and politician (d. 1661)
- Thomas May, English poet and historian (d. 1650)
- Bartholomaeus Nigrinus, Polish Rosicrucian (d. 1646)
- Pocahontas, Algonquian princess (d. 1617)
- Mikołaj Potocki, Polish politician (d. 1651)
- Robert Sempill the younger, Scottish writer (d. 1663)
- Cornelius Vermuyden, Dutch engineer (d. 1683)

=== Probable ===
- Dirck van Baburen, Dutch painter (d. 1624)
- Albrycht Stanisław Radziwiłł, Lithuanian chancellor (d. 1656)

== Deaths ==
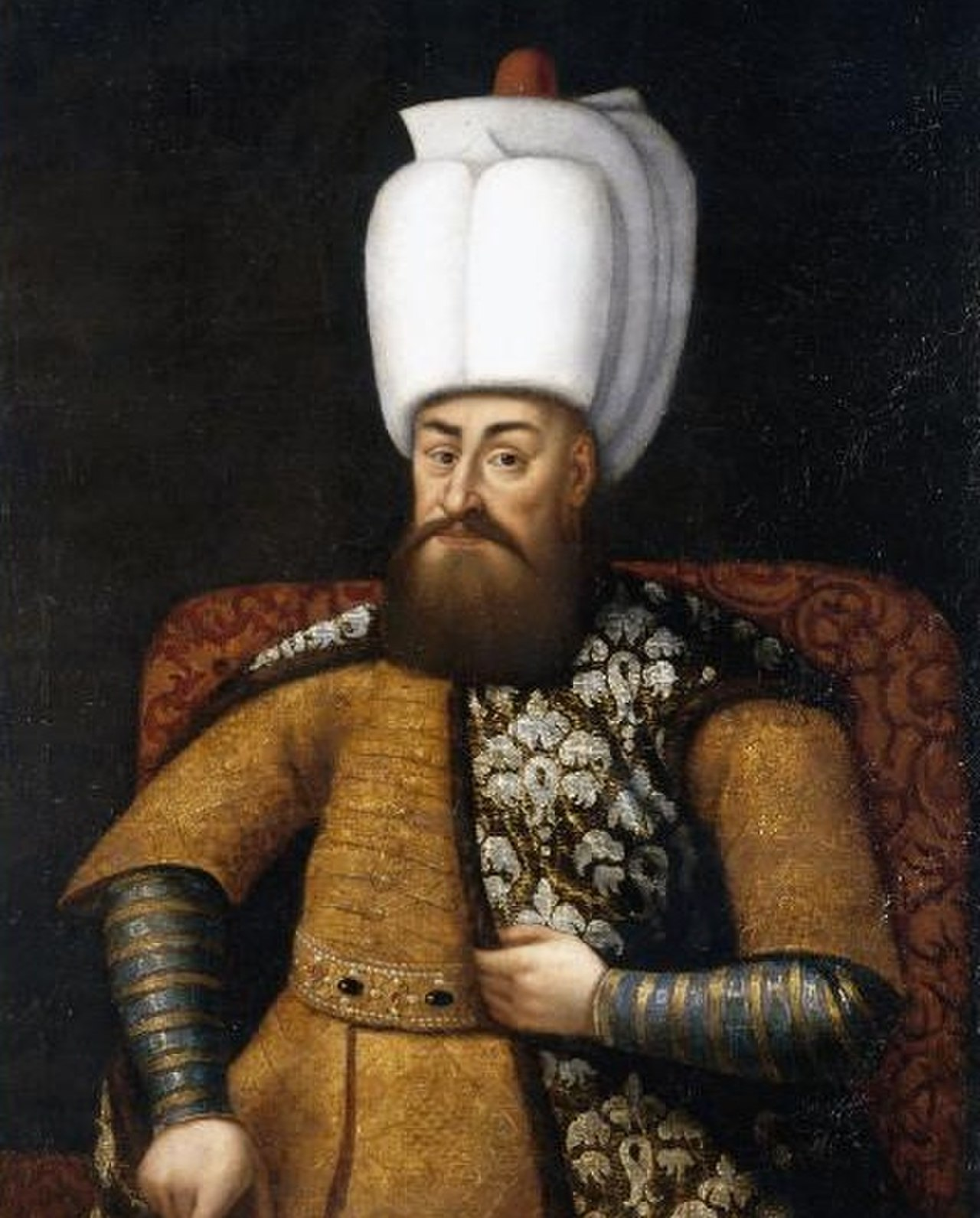
Murad III

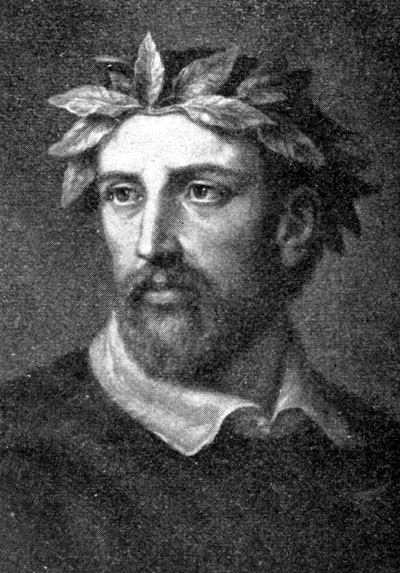
Torquato Tasso

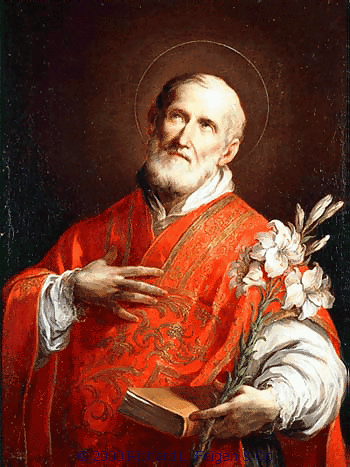
Saint Philip Neri

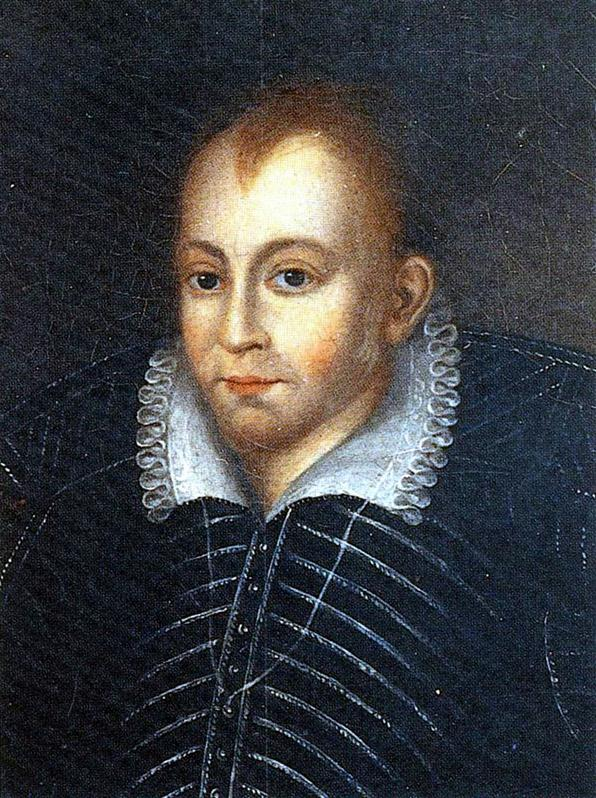
Magnus, Duke of Östergötland

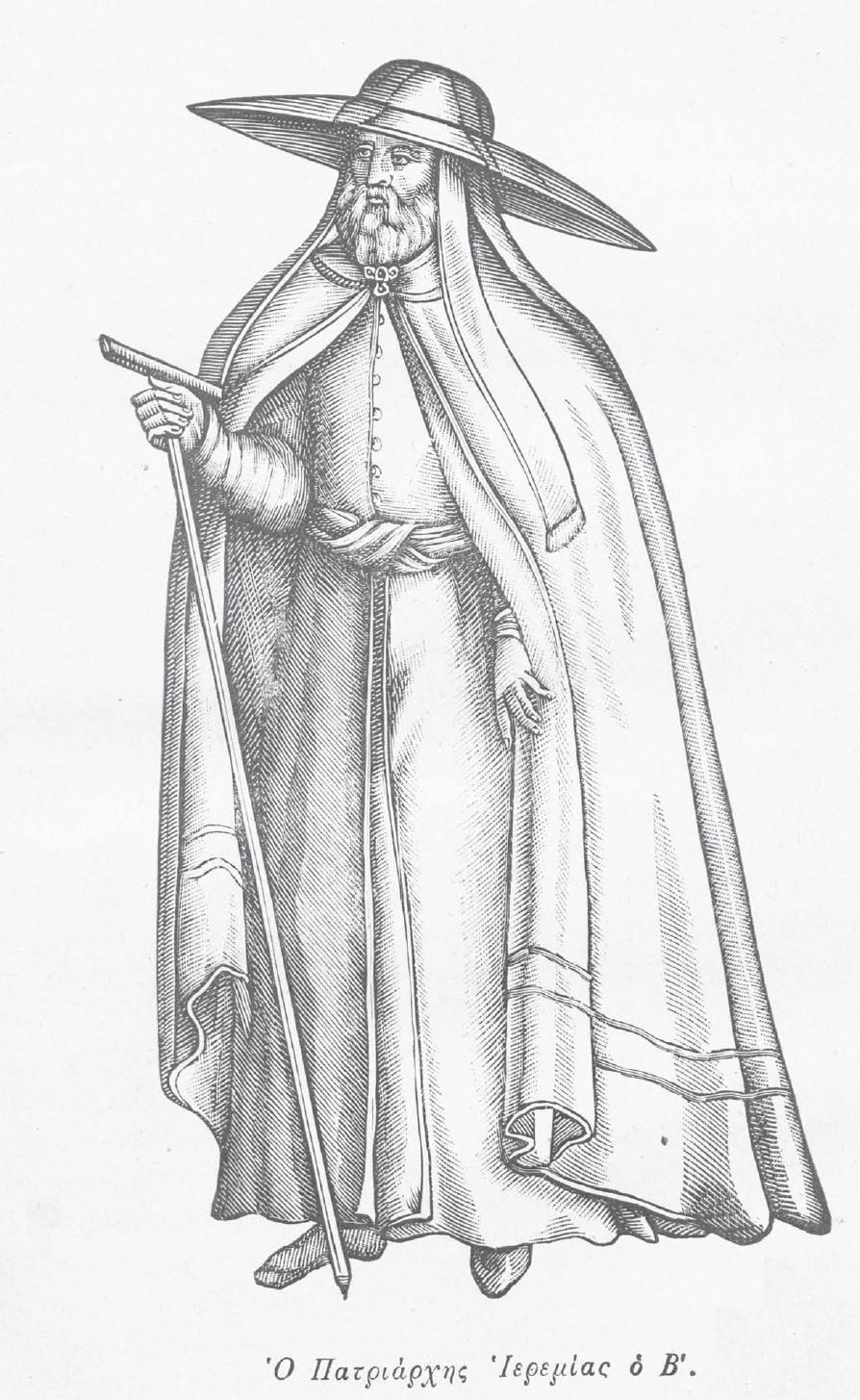
Patriarch Jeremias II of Constantinople

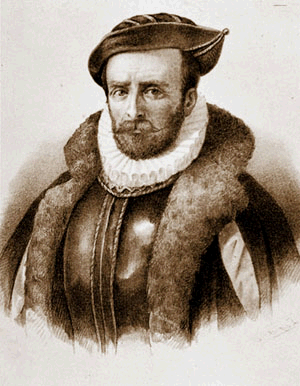
Álvaro de Mendaña de Neira

- January 2 – Barbara of Brandenburg, Duchess of Brieg, German princess (b. 1527)
- January 15 – Murad III, Ottoman Sultan (b. 1546)
- January 24 – Ferdinand II, Archduke of Austria, regent of Tyrol and Further Austria (b. 1529)
- February – William Painter, English translator (b. 1540)
- February 20 – Archduke Ernest of Austria, Governor of the Spanish Netherlands (b. 1553)
- February 21 – Robert Southwell, Jesuit priest and poet (b. 1561)
- April 25 – Torquato Tasso, Italian poet (b. 1544)
- May 4 – Hugues Loubenx de Verdalle, Cardinal and 52nd Grandmaster of the Knights Hospitaller (b. 1531)
- May 14 – Wolfgang, Duke of Brunswick-Grubenhagen (b. 1531)
- May 19 – John Frederick II, Duke of Saxony (b. 1529)
- May 25
  - Valens Acidalius, German critic and poet (b. 1567)
  - Philip Neri, Italian Roman Catholic priest and saint (b. 1515)
- June 23 – Louis Carrion, Flemish humanist and classical scholar (b. 1547)
- June 26 – Magnus, Duke of Östergötland, Swedish prince (b. 1542)
- July 10 – Udai Singh of Marwar, Ruler of Marwar (b. 1538)
- July 23 – Thoinot Arbeau, French priest and author (b. 1519)
- August 24 – Thomas Digges, English astronomer (b. 1546)
- August 26 – Antonio, Prior of Crato, claimant to the throne of Portugal (b. 1531)
- September 3 – Philip of Nassau, Count of Nassau (b. 1566)
- September 4 – Jeremias II of Constantinople (b. 1530)
- October 15 – Faizi, Indo-Persian poet and scholar (b. 1547)
- October 18 – Álvaro de Mendaña de Neira, Spanish navigator and explorer (b. 1542)
- October 19 – Philip Howard, 20th Earl of Arundel, English nobleman (b. 1537)
- October 23 – Louis Gonzaga, Duke of Nevers, Italian-French dignitary and diplomat (b. 1539)
- November 4 – Francesco Cattani da Diacceto, Bishop of Fiesole (b. 1531)
- November 5 – Luis Barahona de Soto, Spanish poet (b. 1548)
- November 12 – John Hawkins, English shipbuilder and trader (b. 1532)
- November 23 – Clara of Brunswick-Wolfenbüttel, Abbess of Gandersheim and Duchess of Brunswick-Grubenhagen (b. 1532)
- December 11 – Philipe de Croÿ, Duke of Aerschot (b. 1526)
- December 14 – Henry Hastings, 3rd Earl of Huntingdon (b. 1535)
- date unknown
  - Grzegorz Branicki, Polish noble (b. 1534)
  - Helena Antonia, court dwarf (b. 1550)
  - Turlough Luineach O'Neill, Irish chief of Tyrone (b. c. 1530)
  - Robert Sempill, Scottish ballad-writer (b. 1530)
  - Thomas Whythorne, English author and musician (b. 1528)
