= Capture of Recife (1595) =

English victory over Spain in Brazil

- Part of the Anglo–Spanish War
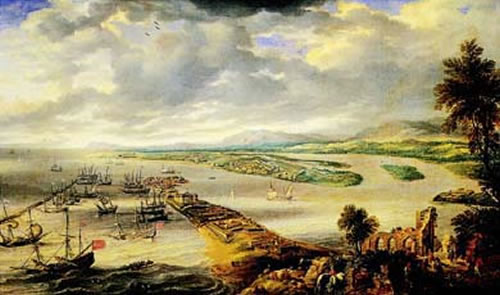
- Recife in the early 17th century by Gillis Peeters
Date	30 March – April 1595
Location	Atlantic Ocean, Recife, Captaincy of Pernambuco, Colonial Brazil
Result	English victory

Belligerents
Spain; Portugal under Philip of Spain	England

Commanders and leaders
Jorge de Albuquerque Coelho	James Lancaster

Strength
350 soldiers and militia Unknown Indian allies	5 ships 30 prizes 400 soldiers & sailors

Casualties and losses
1 galley frigate captured, 29 other prizes Recife: 120 killed, wounded or captured 8 ships captured All stores captured	60 casualties or to disease 1 prize scuttled

The Capture of Recife also known as James Lancaster's 1595 Expedition or Lancaster's Pernambucan expedition was an English military expedition during the Anglo–Spanish War in which the primary objective was the capture of the town and port of Recife in the Captaincy of Pernambuco in the Portuguese colony of Brazil (then within the Iberian Union with Spain) in April 1595. An English expedition of ships led by James Lancaster sailed via the Atlantic capturing numerous prizes before he captured Recife. He held the place for nearly a month and then proceeded to defeat a number of Portuguese counterattacks before leaving. The booty captured was substantial, Lancaster chartered Dutch and French ships that were also present there thus making the expedition a military and financial success.

== Background ==
By virtue of the Iberian Union, the Anglo-Portuguese Treaty of 1373 was in abeyance, and as the Anglo–Spanish War was still ongoing, attacks on Portuguese shipping and colonies were a fair target for the English. The first ever English expedition under James Lancaster was attempted to the East Indies via Penang Island in June 1592. Remaining there until September, Portuguese and Spanish ships were plundered which although highly profitable had been a near disaster in terms of lives lost to storms and disease. Lancaster newly returned in 1593, decided on an expedition to Portuguese Brazil to tap the lucrative sugar and spice market. Lancaster mustered a small fleet of a joint stock venture in late 1594 with John Watts, Simon Boreman, Paul Bayning, John More, and William Shute as the leading investors. The fleet consisted of Consent of 350 tons owned by Watts, followed by Boreman's Saloman of 170 tons and Virgin of 60 tons; these were effectively armed merchant ships some of which had been used against the Spanish Armada. Lancaster had been raised amongst the Portuguese, spoke the language, and had been a trader with them before war had broken out.

== Expedition ==
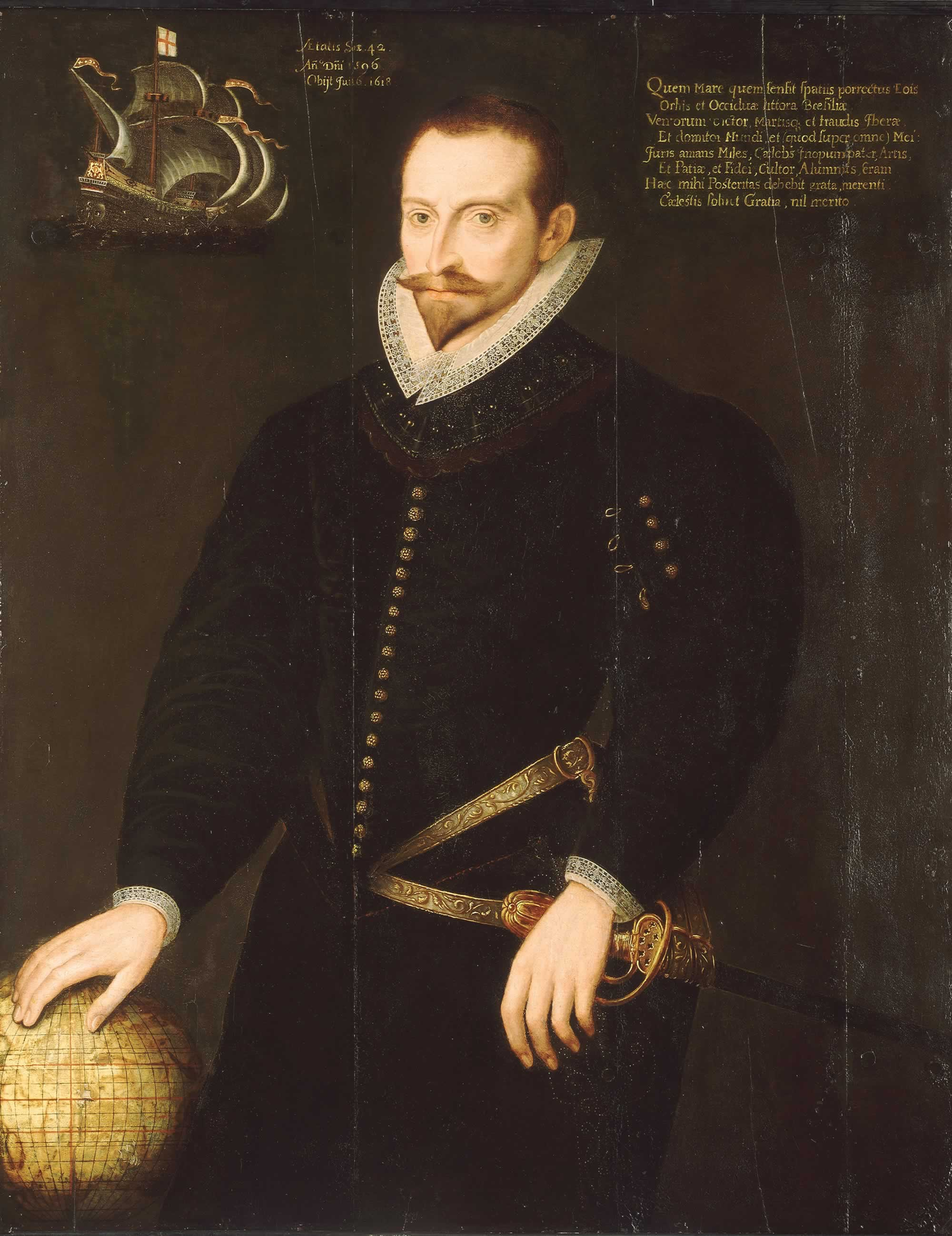
Sir James Lancaster who commanded the expedition to Recife

In October 1594 they sailed from Plymouth, England, and on the outward voyage the English took several Spanish and Portuguese prizes and were joined by Edward Venner captain of the Peregrine out of Portsmouth and Welcome of Plymouth who with them also had a number of Spanish prizes. The combined forces soon captured its largest prize yet, a large Spanish galley-frigate.

As they sailed further South a few of the ships headed back to cash in the prizes, and whilst raiding supplies at Tenerife Lancaster learned from prisoners of a wine ship that a rich carrack from the East Indies had been wrecked near Olinda of which her cargo was safely stowed at Recife. This was great news for Lancaster which gave him even more of an incentive to take Recife. The fleet now totaling nearly fifteen ships would accompany him there and converted the galley-frigate into a troop ship.

By the end of March 1595 Lancaster arrived at Recife which is located where the Beberibe River meets the Capibaribe River to flow into the Atlantic Ocean and as such for the Portuguese it is a major port which was governed by Jorge de Albuquerque Coelho. The place is surrounded by many small coral islands and rivers while Recife itself is protected by Fort São Jorge which lies on a spit of land which leads directly via a sandy isthmus to the next port of Olinda. When Lancaster arrived he found three sixty-ton Dutch fluitships already there intending to take the cargo and prevent it going back to Portugal. Lancaster went aboard the Dutch ship and made arrangements with their commander, both of whom agreed to share the spoils as the English had the means to take the town and hold it, whilst the Dutch did not.

=== Capture of Recife ===
On the early hours of Good Friday, Lancaster landed his troops on the beach and surrounded Recife on both land and sea so that the Portuguese would be confused as to where the main attack was to come from. After a preliminary naval bombardment the English attacked on all sides and the Portuguese resistance, although strong to start with, soon petered out; Fort São Jorge was overwhelmed and the spit of land was taken with only minor loss and consequently the town itself was taken with little resistance. The garrison fled to Olinda almost three miles away and took refuge, meanwhile Lancaster, with only ten casualties, permitted not the slightest disorder after the place was taken.

Now in possession of the area, Lancaster knew the Portuguese were preparing a counterattack so he strengthened Fort São Jorge (using the captured ordinance), which connected Recife with Olinda. He then proceeded at leisure to stow his ships with the goods found in the town of which there nearly 100 houses and store buildings. He agreed a fee with the Dutch captains to take a load of looted sugar and Brazil wood to England instead of Holland with Virgin to make sure they did, in effect using a diplomacy to charter the Dutch ships.

The Portuguese however intended to drive the English away so made several attempts at retaking the town, but each time assaulting the fortified isthmus they were repelled with heavy losses. The next attempt was made via the waters; blazing rafts were sent down the river and at the same time an attempt by fire-ships on sea was also made but these attempts were frustrated by Lancaster.

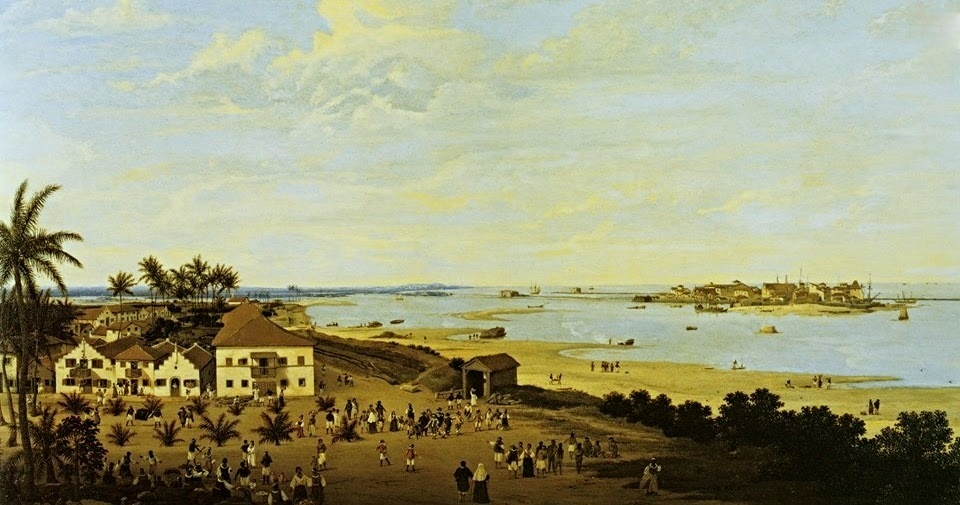
The coast of Recife with Fort São Jorge on the spit of land on the right.

A number of French corsairs arrived during the middle of the occupation and Lancaster, being an exceptional diplomat as well of military mind, gave them Brazilwood in order to keep them satisfied; as a result they left without any bloodshed and even chartered one of the French ships to sail to England, a number of them also stayed to fight with the English. With this extra number Lancaster ordered an attack on Olinda in order to deter any aggression while they consolidated their gains. This was achieved at night and Olinda was sacked after meeting little resistance with more booty taken, the majority being sugar.

After remaining in possession of Recife for more than twenty days Lancaster knew that he would have to leave soon and prepared to sail. The Portuguese however were observed constructing a battery to command the entrance of the harbor, and Lancaster, sent a strong party of 275 men to destroy their work. Attacking at night the English surprised the Portuguese who fled and the destruction was achieved, but some order was lost as fifty of the English ran forward, beyond the cover of the ships' broadsides, were met by a large body of Portuguese and their Indian allies and were ambushed. Almost all the officers of the party including Venner (who was trying to get them back), and others to the number of thirty-five were killed before the rest found the safety of the English lines. Buoyed by this success the Portuguese with their Indian allies then launched another attack on the isthmus, only to be repelled again this time with the help of the ships guns. After this close call Lancaster decided that the occupation had reached its end and decided to take advantage of leaving unmolested with the destruction of the battery.

== Aftermath ==
Lancaster put to sea with fifteen vessels ladened with merchandises but a strong gale outside caused the fleet to be scattered. Lancaster had four ships with him and arrived in the Downs in July, only one ship never made it, that being a Portuguese prize heavily damaged in gales and lack of crew so was scuttled.

The declared value of the bulk of goods from the carrack brought back by Consent and Salomon was £31,000 and the cargo of Virgin and two of the fluitships were assessed at £15,000. Pereguine, Welcome their prize and the other fluitship carried at least as much totaling over £51,000. As well as Brazil wood the carracks cargo consisted of pepper, cloves, indigo, cinnamon, mace, Benzoin resin, frankincense, gum-lac, aloes, calicoes, silks, and rutile quartz blonde stones. In all the total would have represented £6,100 for the Lord Admiral and £3,050 for the Queen. Also of importance were new Portuguese rutters captured at Recife; Lancaster would use them to great effect for the first ever English East India company expedition in 1601.

Philip II of Spain on hearing the news of the raid, as well as Walter Raleigh's capture of the settlement of Trinidad and the sack of Caracas by George Somers and Amyas Preston was enraged. He held the notion that any attack must be answered by an appropriate response, since a failure to act would be taken by friends and foes alike as a sign of weakness, and lead ultimately to the ruin of his states. As a result, the Spanish raid on Mount's Bay in Cornwall on 13 August of the same year was carried out in retaliation.

The Portuguese would soon increase Recife's defenses and forts were built on the isthmus between Recife and Olinda to deter subsequent attacks but to little avail. The Dutch would return here again and again before being forced out by the mid 1600s by the Portuguese. The attack on Recife however goes down in history as being the last attack ever made by the English on the coast of Brazil.

== See also ==
- Siege of Recife (1630)
- Recapture of Recife
- East India Company
