= Westward Ho! (novel) =

1855 novel by Charles Kingsley

Westward, Ho!
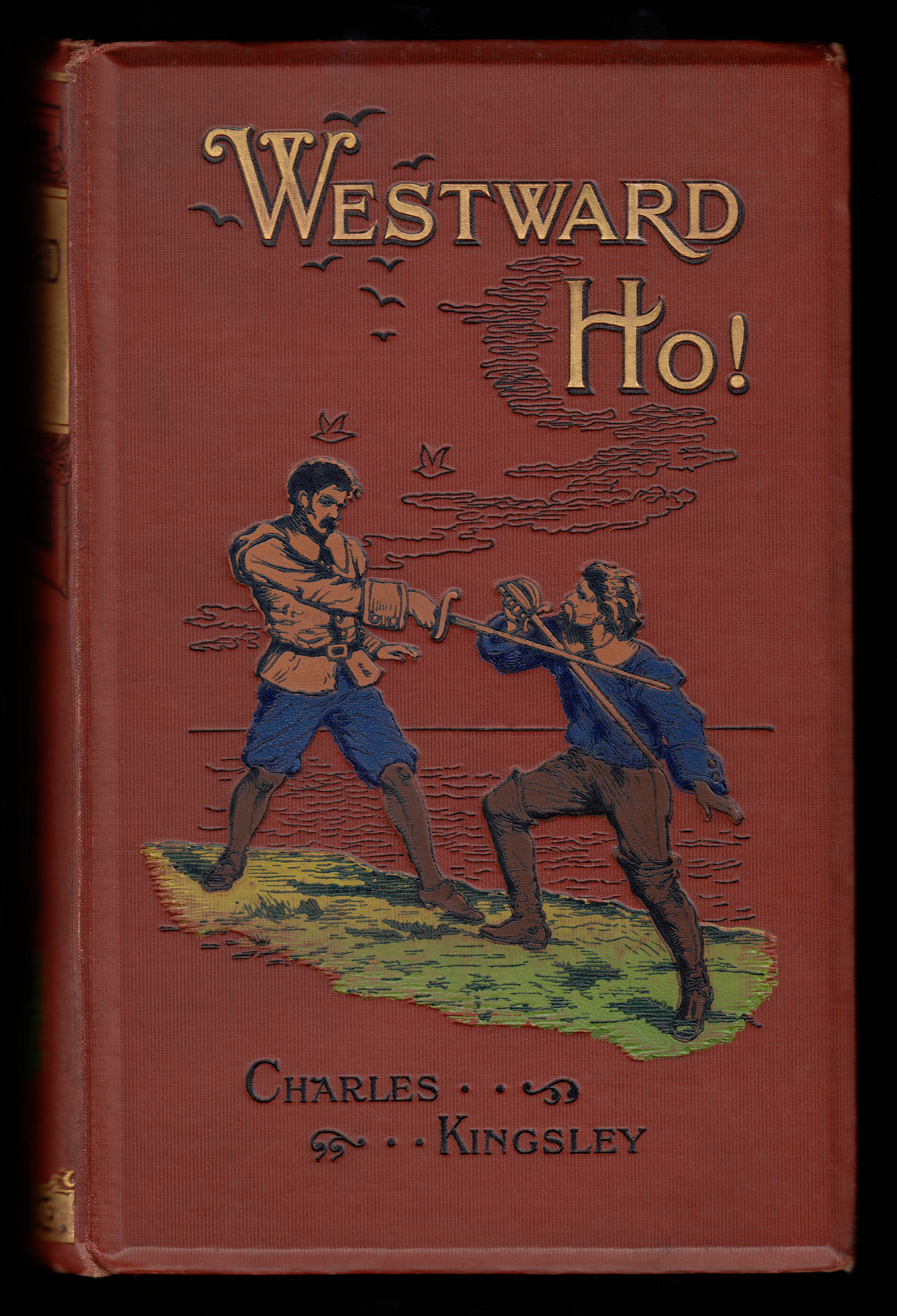
- Cover of an 1899 edition by Frederick Warne & Co
- Author: Charles Kingsley
- Language: English
- Genre: Adventure fiction
- Publication date: 1855
- Publication place: United Kingdom
- Pages: 378
- ISBN: 1500778745
- OCLC: 219787413
- Text: Westward, Ho! at Wikisource

Westward Ho! is an 1855 historical novel written by British author Charles Kingsley, set in the Elizabethan era and written in a mock Elizabethan tone. It follows the adventures of Amyas Leigh, who sets sail with Francis Drake and other privateers to the Caribbean, where they battle with the Spanish. Originally targeted at adults, Westward Ho! was deemed suitable for children due to its mixture of patriotism, sentiment and romance, and became a firm favourite of children's literature during the 19th century. Its popularity has declined in the 21st century because of its anti-Catholicism and its racist attitudes towards indigenous peoples.

== Plot ==
Set initially in Bideford in North Devon during the reign of Elizabeth I, Westward Ho! follows the adventures of Amyas Leigh, an unruly child who as a young man follows Francis Drake to sea. Amyas loves local beauty Rose Salterne, as does nearly everyone else; much of the novel involves Rose's elopement with a Spaniard.

Amyas spends time in the Caribbean coasts of Venezuela seeking gold, and in the process finds his true love, the beautiful Indian maiden Ayacanora. During the return journey to England, he discovers that Rose and his brother Frank have been burnt at the stake by the Spanish Inquisition. He vows revenge on all Spaniards, and joins in the defence of England against the Spanish Armada. When he is permanently blinded by a freak bolt of lightning at sea, he accepts this as God's judgement and finds peace in forgiveness.

== Title ==
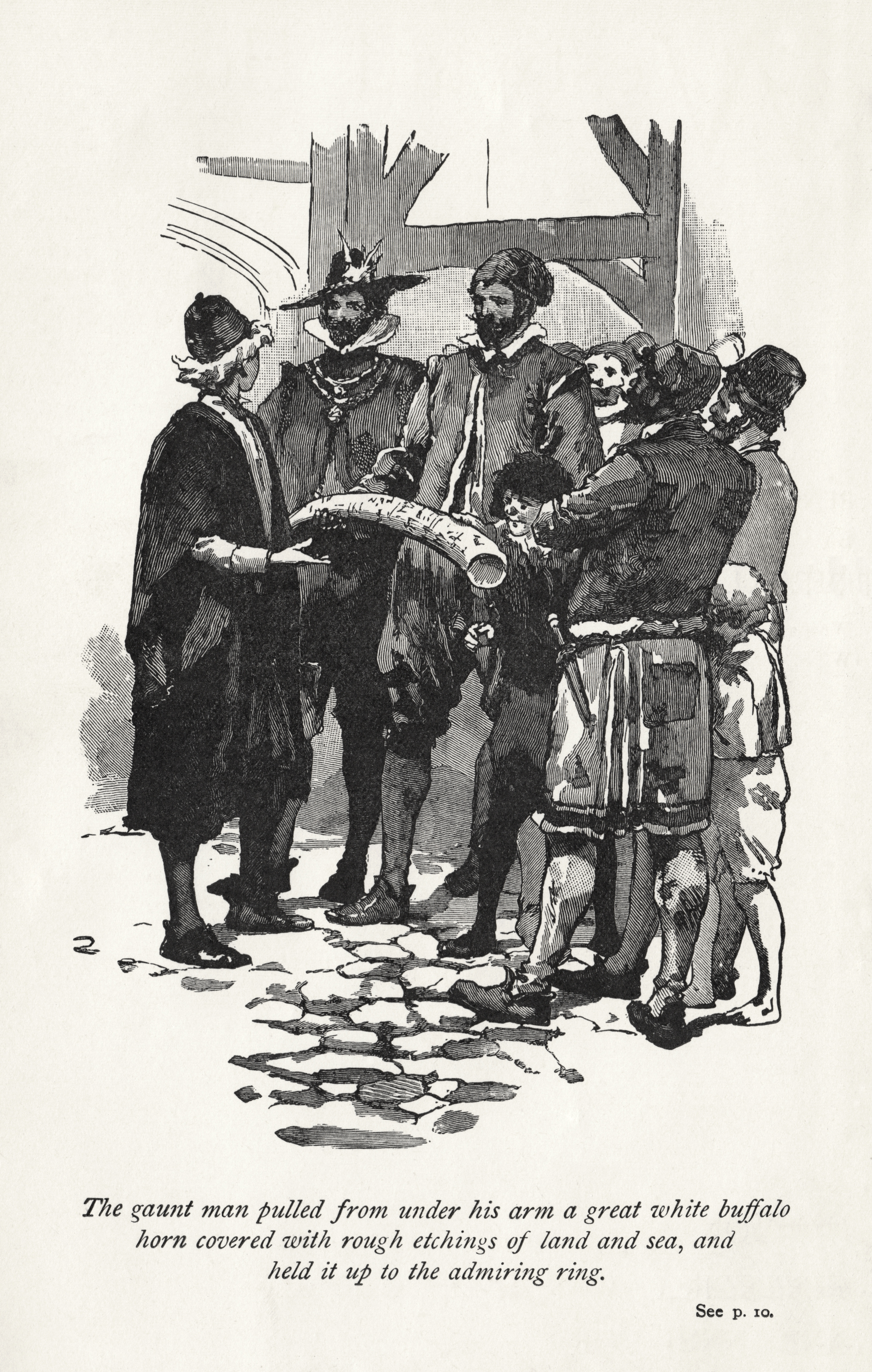
Frontispiece by Walter Sydney Stacey from an 1899 edition.

The title of the book derives from the traditional call of boat-taxis on the River Thames, which would call "Eastward ho!" and "Westward ho!" to show their destination. "Ho!" is an interjection or a call to attract passengers, without a specific meaning besides "hey!" or "come!" The title is also a nod towards the play Westward Ho!, written by John Webster and Thomas Dekker in 1604, which satirised the perils of the westward expansion of London. The full title of Kingsley's novel is Westward Ho! Or The Voyages and Adventures of Sir Amyas Leigh, Knight of Burrough, in the County of Devon, in the reign of Her Most Glorious Majesty, Queen Elizabeth, Rendered into Modern English by Charles Kingsley. This elaborate title is intended to reflect the mock-Elizabethan style of the novel. Viola's use of "Westward ho!" in William Shakespeare's Twelfth Night is an earlier reference.

Kingsley dedicated the novel to Sir James Brooke, Rajah of Sarawak, and Bishop George Selwyn, whom he saw as modern representatives of the heroic values of the privateers who were active during the Elizabethan era.

== Themes ==
Westward Ho! is a historical novel which celebrates England's victories over Spain in the Elizabethan era. The story is partially based on the Preston-Somers expedition which took place in 1595, where the Caribbean coasts of Venezuela was successfully raided. Amyas Leigh was based upon Amyas Preston.

Although originally a political radical, Kingsley had by the 1850s become increasingly conservative and a strong supporter of overseas expansion. The novel consistently emphasises the superiority of English values over those of the "decadent Spanish". Although originally written for adults, its mixture of patriotism, sentiment, and romance caused it to be deemed suitable for children, and it became a firm favourite of children's literature.

A prominent theme of the novel is the 16th-century fear of Catholic domination, and this reflects Kingsley's own dislike of Catholicism. In the novel, Protestant Englishmen are shown correcting the worst excesses of the Spanish Jesuits and the Inquisition.

The novel's virulent anti-Catholicism, as well as its racially insensitive depictions of the South Americans, has made the novel less appealing to a modern audience, although it is still regarded by some as Kingsley's "liveliest, and most interesting novel."

== Adaptations ==
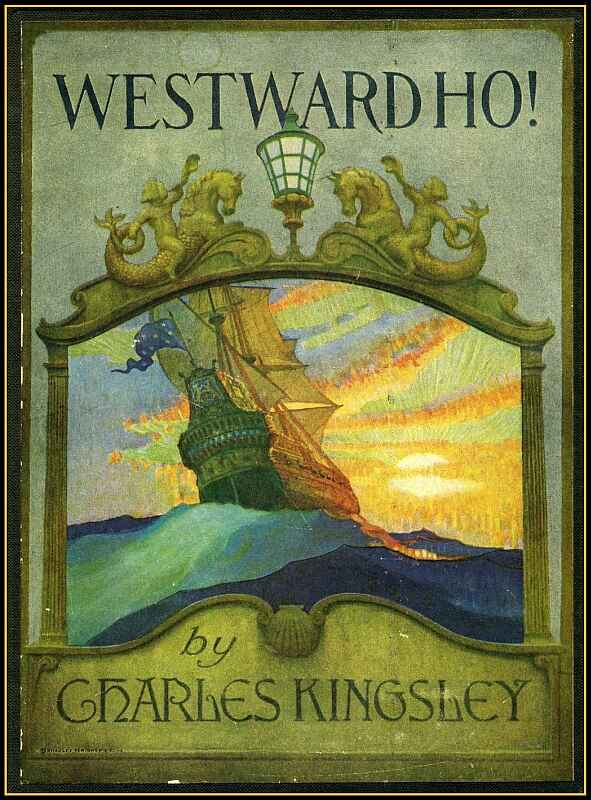
1920 edition illustrated with paintings by N. C. Wyeth

In April 1925, the book was the first novel to be adapted for radio by the BBC. The first movie adaptation of the novel was a 1919 silent film, Westward Ho!, directed by Percy Nash. A 1988 children's animated film, Westward Ho!, produced by Burbank Films Australia, was loosely based on Kingsley's novel.

== Legacy ==
The book is the inspiration behind the unusual name of the village of Westward Ho! in Devon, the only place name in the United Kingdom that contains an exclamation mark.

J. G. Ballard, in an interview with Vanora Bennett, claimed that being forced to copy lines from the novel as a punishment at the age of eight or nine was the moment he realised he would become a writer.
