= George Somers =

English admiral (1554–1610)

Admiral Sir George Somers
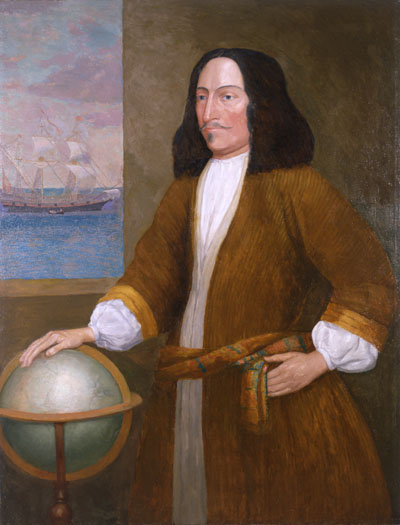
- Portrait believed to be of Somers

Member of Parliament for Lyme Regis
- In office 19 March 1604 – 10 February 1610

Personal details
- Born: before 24 April 1554 Lyme Regis, Dorset, England
- Died: 9 November 1610 (aged 56) Bermuda
- Resting place: Whitchurch Canonicorum
- Relations: Matthew Somers (nephew)
- Occupation: Privateer, sea captain
- Awards: Knight Bachelor (1603)
- Employer: Virginia Company of London

Military service
- Branch: Royal Navy
- Years of service: 1595–1606
- Rank: Captain
- Wars: Anglo-Spanish War

Sir George Somers (before 24 April 1554 – 9 November 1610) was an English privateer and naval hero, knighted for his achievements and the Admiral of the Virginia Company of London. He achieved renown as part of an expedition led by Sir Amyas Preston that plundered Caracas and Santa Ana de Coro in 1595, during the undeclared Anglo-Spanish War. He is remembered today as the founder of the English colony of Bermuda, also known as the Somers Isles.

== Career ==
Somers was born in Lyme Regis, Dorset, in 1554, the son of John Somers and his wife. From a young age he became a skilled and well-known seaman and owned at least one ship, the Julian, whose home port was Lyme Regis. Somers' first venture in command of the Flibcote, in company of three other vessels during the undeclared Anglo-Spanish War, on a raid to Spain; he brought home Spanish prizes worth more than £8,000.

=== Preston Somers Expedition ===
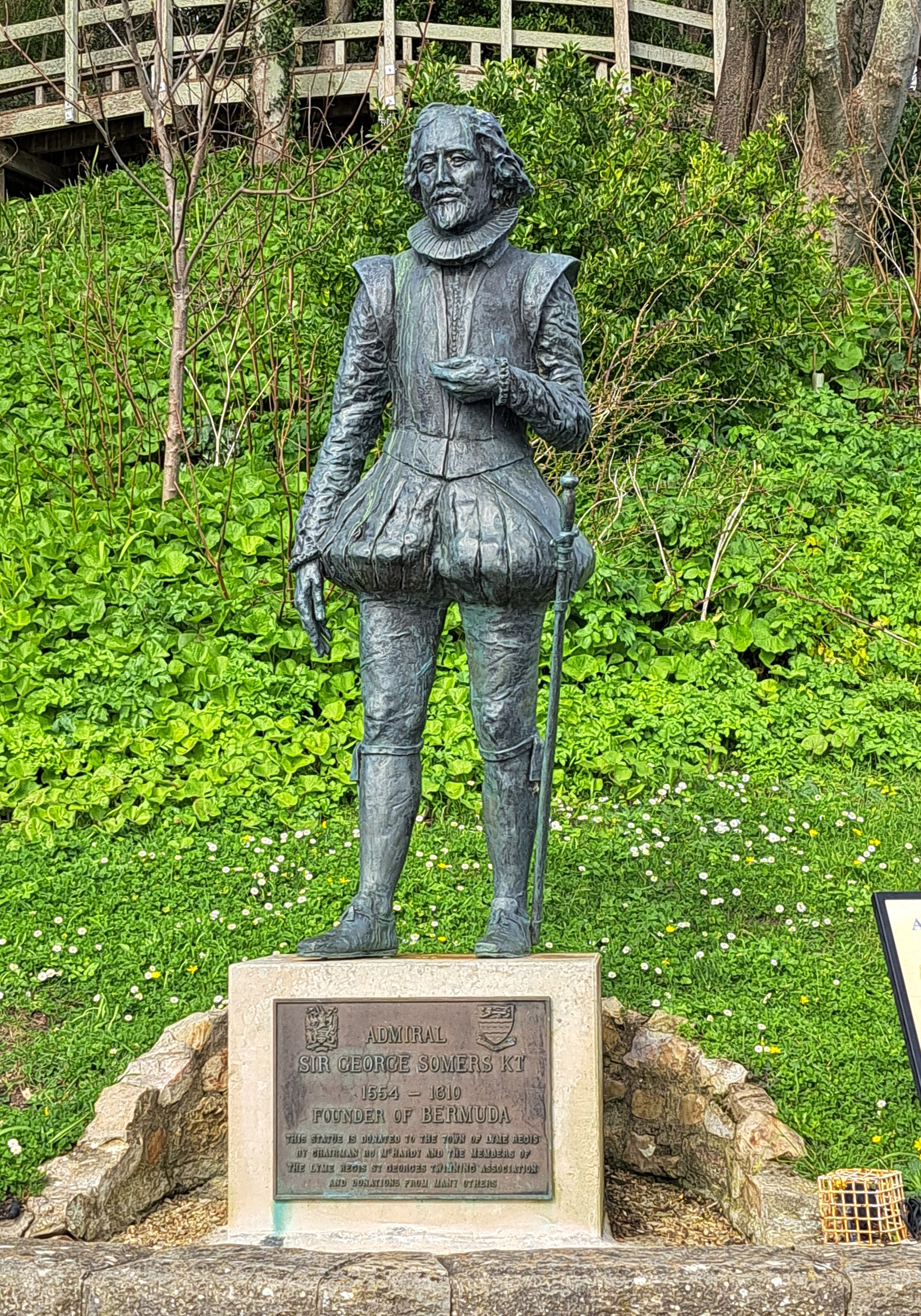
Sir George Somers - Statue, Lyme Regis

Somers then joined up with another seaman Amyas Preston who had fought against the Spanish Armada. Both agreed to take part in Walter Raleigh's El Dorado expedition to Trinidad and Guiana in 1595 in search of the mythical city of gold, as well as to commit to amphibious descents throughout the Spanish Main with them. However, after failing to meet, the Somers Expedition went on their own venture along the coast of the Spanish Province of Venezuela and captured the fort at La Guaira before they headed South inland. After making an arduous trek through the mountains of pico Naiguata the English led by Preston and Somers were able to outmanoeuvre the waiting Spanish force and captured the colonial city of Santiago de Leon de Caracas.

After the failure of a ransom they plundered and torched the city and then went to capture Santa Ana de Coro before they made a brief excursion to the Spanish West Indies. Despite the challenges they faced the expedition was a success for the English who were able to return unmolested with some profit having set out as only a supporting expedition. Between 1600 and 1602, Somers commanded several English ships, including Vanguard, Swiftsure and Warspite. He was knighted in 1603, and became Member of Parliament for Lyme Regis in March 1604.

=== Virginia Company ===
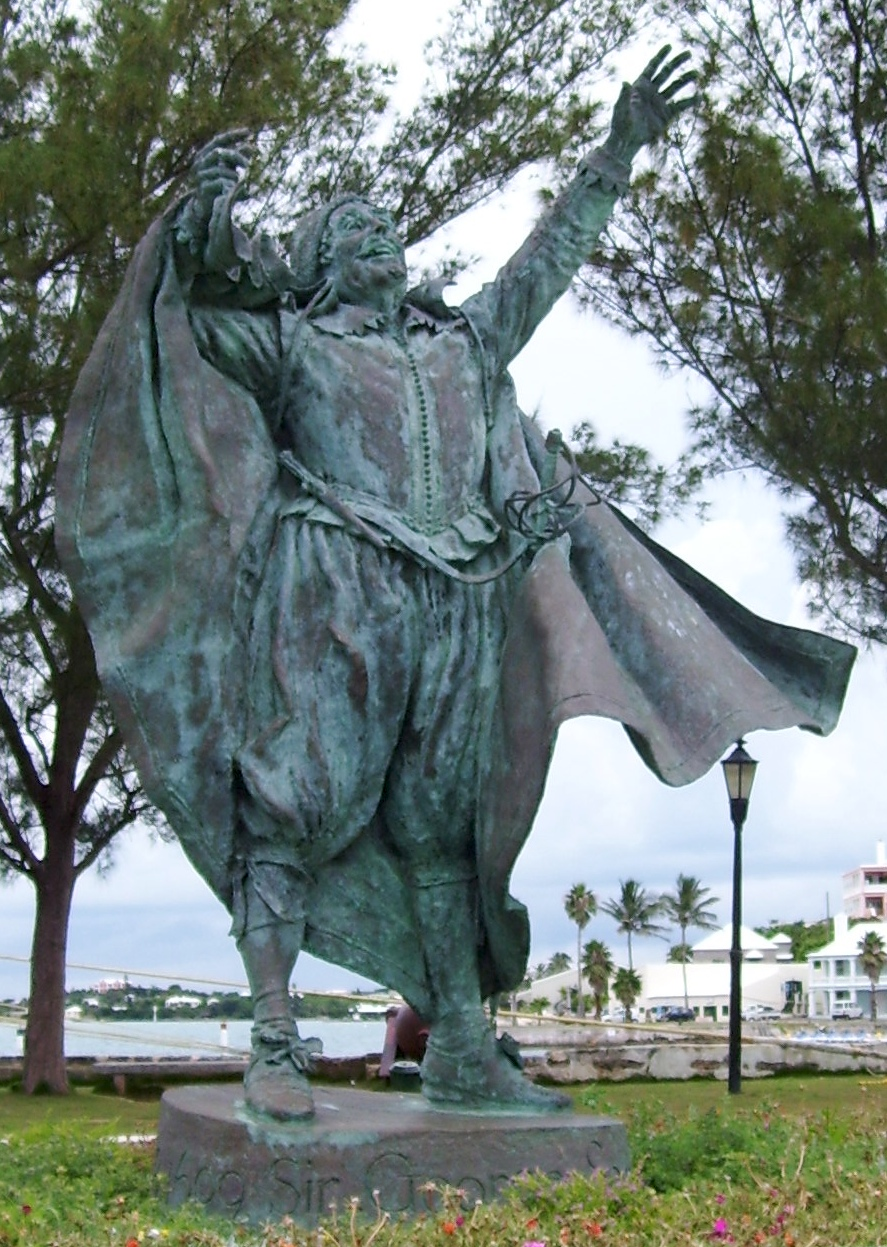
Statue of Sir George Somers, Bermuda

In 1609, Somers was appointed as admiral of the Virginia Company's Third Supply relief fleet, organized to provide relief to the Jamestown colony settled in North America two years before. On 2 June 1609, he set sail from Plymouth on the Sea Venture, the flagship of the seven-ship fleet, (towing two additional pinnaces) destined for Jamestown, Virginia. The fleet carried a total of 500–600 colonists bound for Jamestown.

On 25 July, the fleet ran into a strong storm, probably a hurricane, and the ships were separated. The Sea Venture fought the storm for three days. Comparably-sized ships had survived such weather, but the Sea Venture had a critical flaw; she had recently been constructed and her timbers had not set. The caulking was forced from between them, and the ship began to leak rapidly. All hands were applied to bailing, but the water continued to rise in the hold. The ship's guns were reportedly jettisoned—though two were salvaged from the wreck in 1612, to arm Bermuda's first fort—to raise her buoyancy, but this only delayed the inevitable. Sir George Somers was at the helm through the storm.

When the piloting Somers spied land on the morning of 28 July, the water in the ship's hold had risen to 9 feet (2.7 m), and crew and passengers had been driven past the point of exhaustion. Somers (either deliberately or accidentally) drove the ship onto the reefs in order to prevent the Sea Venture foundering. This allowed all hands (150 people and a dog aboard) to reach shore safely using boats. Those in the flotilla who continued on to Virginia presumed that Somers and the others had died in the storm, which had battered the relief fleet and damaged its supplies.

Somers and his company remained in Bermuda for 10 months, living on food they could gather on the island and fish from the sea. Some commentators believe that this incident inspired William Shakespeare's play The Tempest. During their time on the islands, the crew and passengers built a church and houses, the start of the Bermuda colony. Somers and Sir Thomas Gates oversaw the construction of two small ships, the Deliverance and the Patience. They were built from local timber (Bermuda Cedar) and the salvaged spars and rigging of the wrecked Sea Venture.

In May 1610, the ships set sail for Jamestown, with the surviving 142 castaways on board taking food from the island. When they reached the settlement, they found it nearly destroyed by famine and disease of what has been called the Starving Time. Few of the supplies from the Supply Relief Fleet had arrived (the same tropical storm which caught the Sea Venture had damaged some of the rest of the fleet), and only 60 settlers survived. Only the food and help offered by those on the two small ships from Bermuda, followed by a relief fleet in July 1610, commanded by Lord Delaware, enabled the colony to survive and avoided the abandonment of Jamestown.

=== Return to Bermuda ===
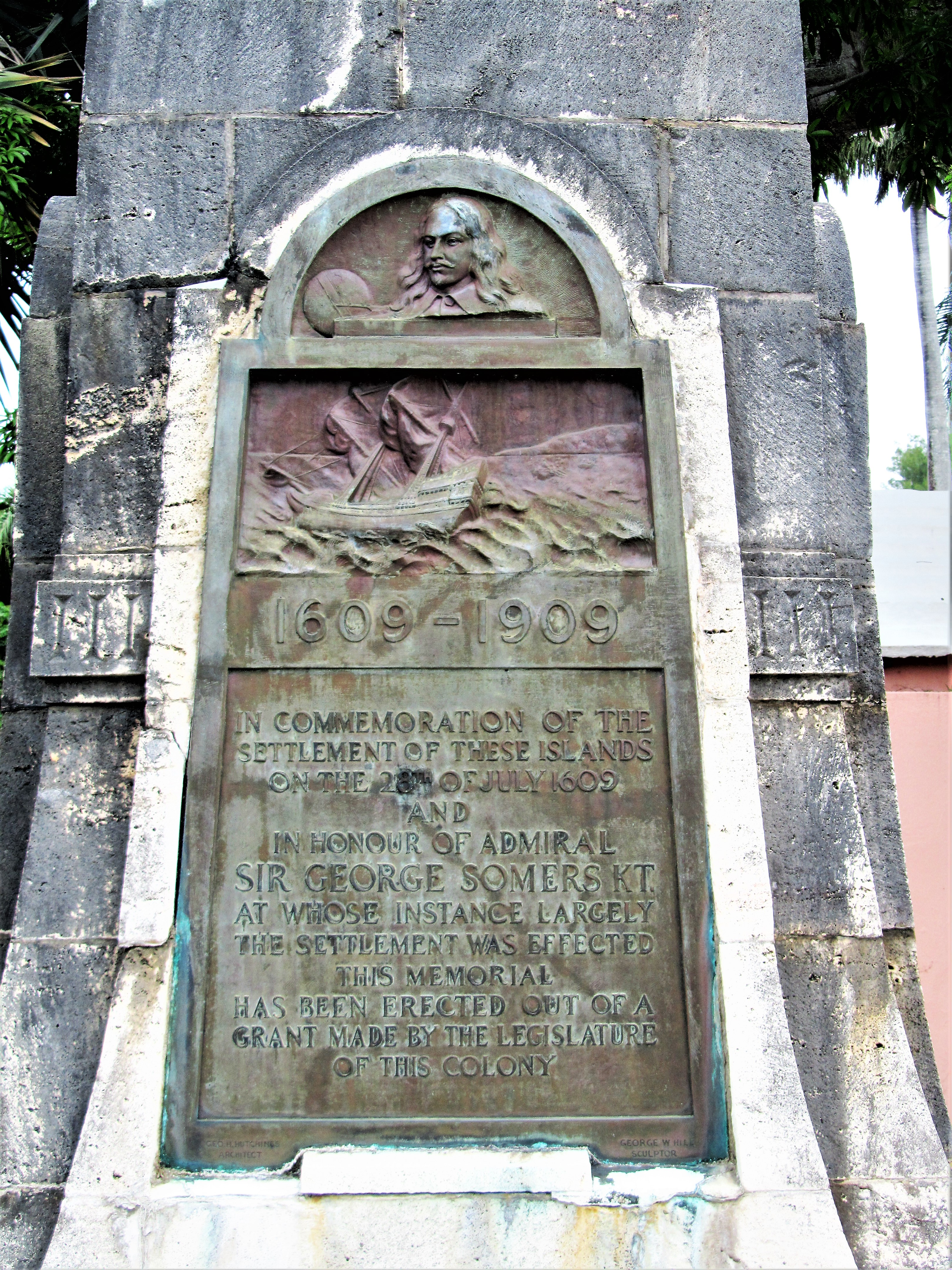
1909 plaque commemorating the settlement of Bermuda

Somers set out for Bermuda in the Patience to collect more food (such as feral hogs), but he became ill on the journey. He died in Bermuda on November 9, 1610, at age 56, likely from exhaustion or an overexertion-related illness.

It is recorded that his nephew, Matthew Somers, buried George's heart and organs somewhere near what is now Somers Garden, and preserved the rest of body in a cask of whiskey. The preserved remains were taken back to England and buried in his home hamlet of Whitchurch Canonicorum near to the town of Lyme Regis.
