= Niklaus Dachselhofer =

Swiss politician

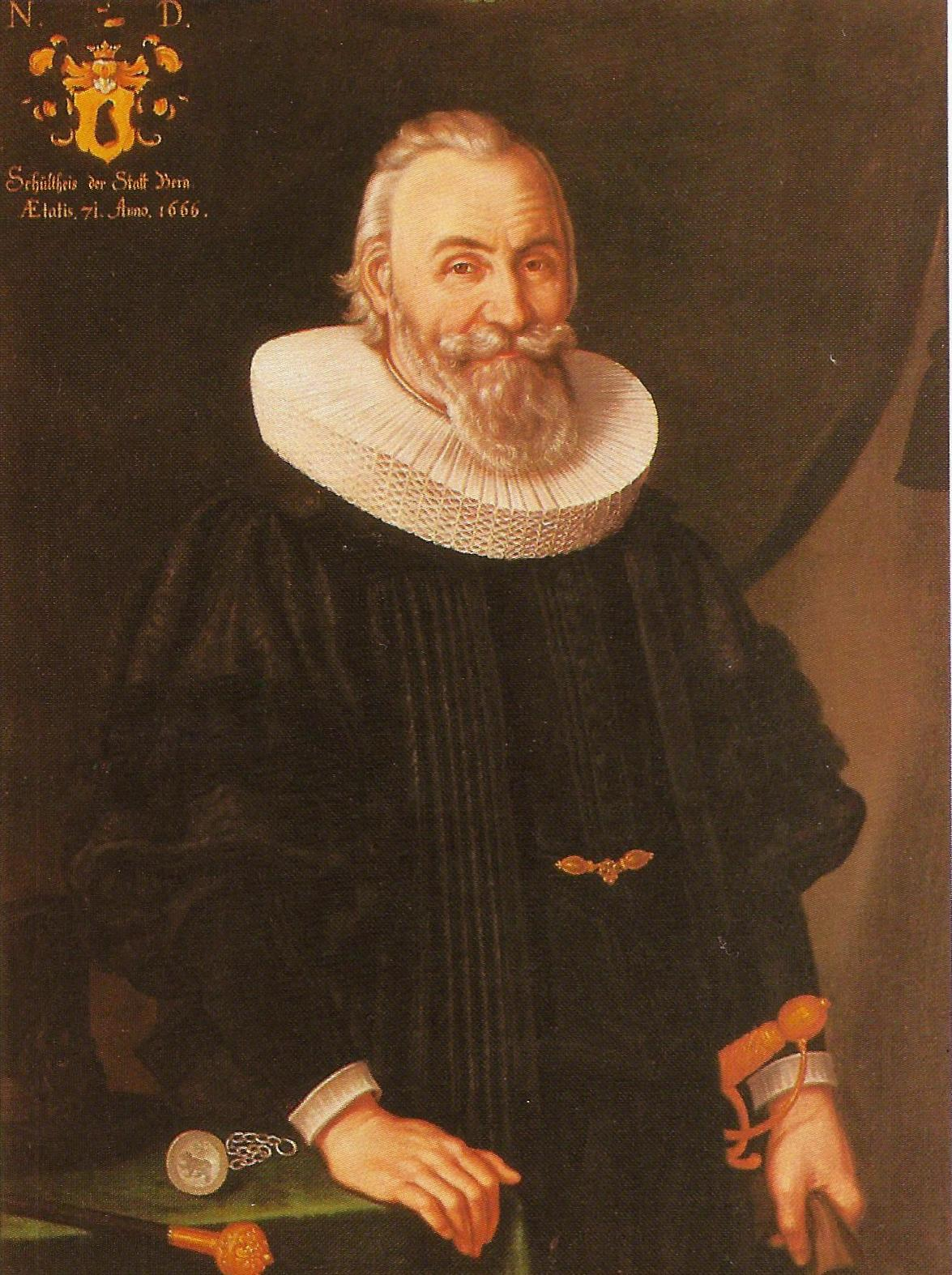
Niklaus Dachselhofer, 1666.

Niklaus Dachselhofer (18 November 1595 – 12 February 1670, sometimes given as "Daxelhofer") was a Swiss politician in Bern. He became a member of the canton's Grand Council in 1628 and one year later also a member of the city council (Kleiner Rat). From 1636 to 1667 he was Schultheiss (mayor) of Berne.
