= Pico Naiguatá =

Mountain in Venezuela

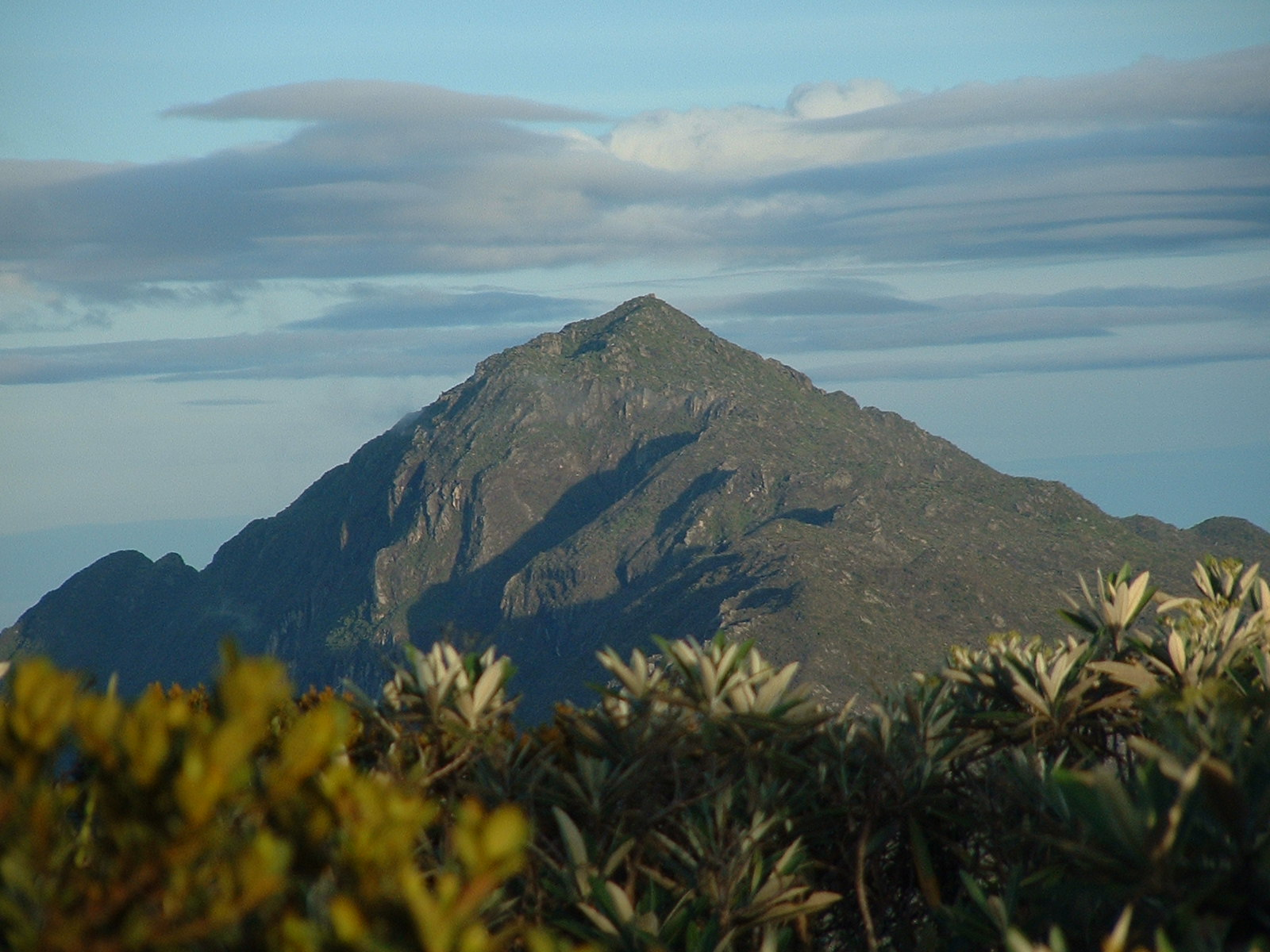

Highest point
- Elevation: 2,765 m (9,072 ft)
- Prominence: 2,455 m (8,054 ft)
- Listing: Ultra
- Coordinates: 10°32′36″N 66°46′57″W

Geography
- Location within Venezuela
- Location: Miranda / Vargas, Venezuela

Pico Naiguatá is the summit of a mountain in South America near Caracas, Venezuela, part of the Venezuelan Coastal Range, of which it is the highest peak. It is situated on the border of the Venezuelan states Miranda and Vargas. With a summit elevation of 2,765 metres (9,072 ft) above sea level and a prominence of 2,455 metres (8,054 ft), it is the highest point in both of these states and the fourth highest of the Caribbean after Pico Simón Bolivar and Pico Cristóbal Colón of the Sierra Nevada de Santa Marta range in Colombia and Pico Duarte in the Dominican Republic.

== See also ==
- List of Ultras of South America
- Preston Somers Expedition
