= Jacob Whiddon =

English British sea-captain

- Occupation: Sea captain

Jacob Whiddon (fl. 1585–1595) was an English sea captain.

== Biography ==
Whiddon was a trusted servant and follower of Sir Walter Ralegh, who speaks of him as ‘a man most valiant and honest,’ seems to have been with Sir Richard Grenville in his voyage to Virginia in 1585. In 1588 he commanded Ralegh's ship the Roebuck, in the fleet under Lord Howard, and is described as particularly active in the various services which could be performed by so small a vessel. He took possession of, and brought into Torbay, the flagship of Don Pedro de Valdes; he brought supplies of ammunition to the fleet, and was constantly employed in scouting duty. In 1594 he was sent out by Ralegh to make a preliminary exploration of the Orinoco. His object was frustrated by the governor of Trinidad, who imprisoned some of his crew, and practically obliged him to return to England without the information he sought. It is probable that he was with Ralegh in the voyage to Guiana in 1595, the expedition against Cadiz in 1596, and the Islands' voyage in 1597; but his name is not mentioned.
