= Raleigh's El Dorado expedition =

English military and exploratory expedition

Raleigh's El Dorado Expedition
- Part of the Anglo-Spanish War
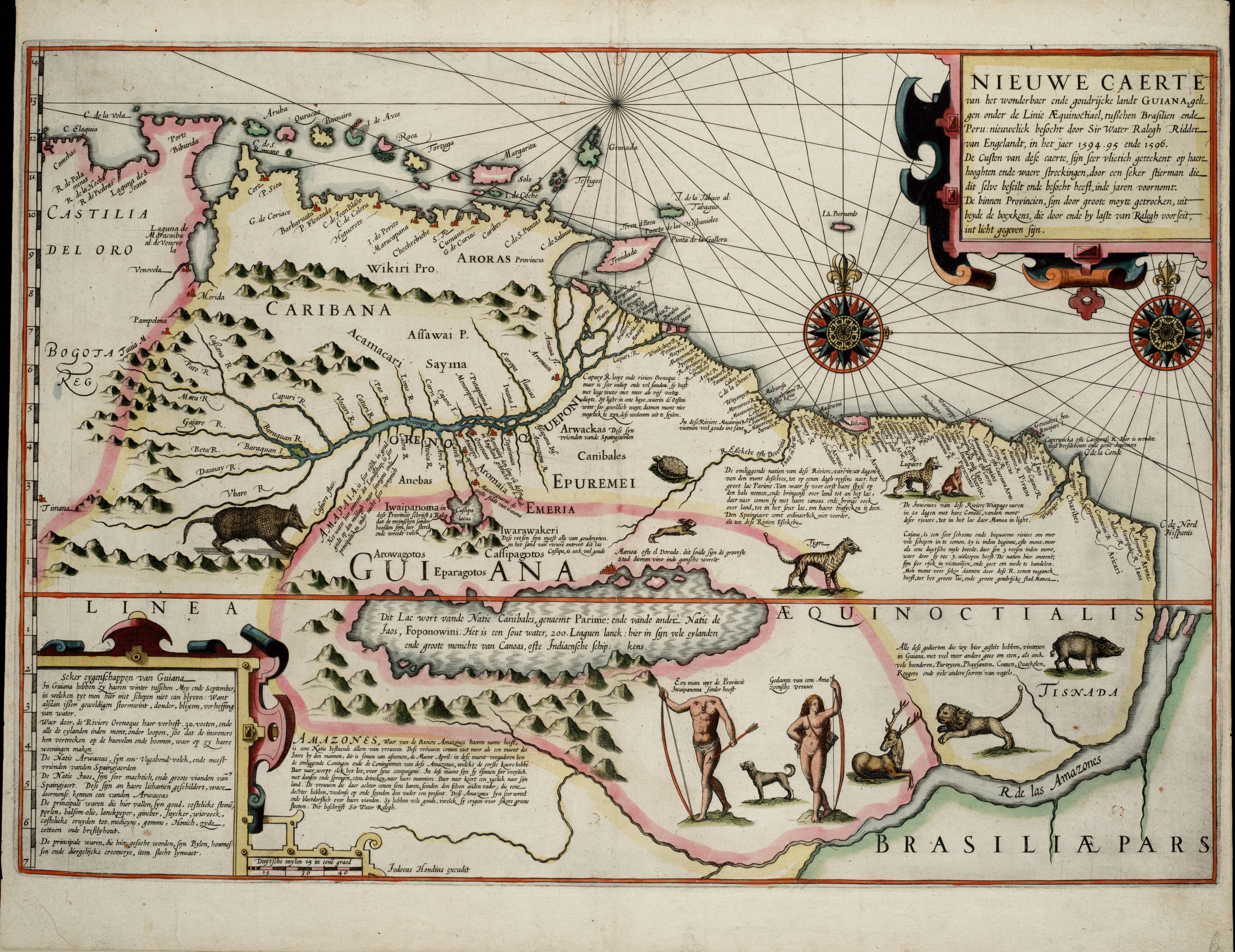
- Map from 1599, made as a result of the expedition showing the supposed Lake Parime with Manoa on its northeastern shore
Date	February – August 1595
Location	Atlantic, Trinidad and Orinoco river
Result	English victory

Belligerents
Spain	England

Commanders and leaders
Antonio de Berrío	Walter Raleigh

Raleigh's El Dorado expedition, also known as Raleigh's first voyage to Guiana, was an English military and exploratory expedition led by Sir Walter Raleigh that took place during the Anglo-Spanish War in 1595. The expedition set out in February 1595 to explore the Orinoco River on the northeast tip of South America in an attempt to find the fabled city of El Dorado.

Raleigh first captured the Spanish settlement of San José de Oruña on the colony of Trinidad, along with the Governor Antonio de Berrío, who had been looking for El Dorado since the 1580s. After questioning De Berrío, Raleigh and the English held the place and used it as a base for their exploration. Despite the presence of a Spanish force shadowing him, Raleigh successfully navigated the river and inlets, penetrating some 400 miles (640 km) into the Guiana highlands.

No gold or lost city was ever found; however, Raleigh returned to England and subsequently exaggerated his account. Still, the expedition resulted in an important alliance with the natives of the region, which would have a lasting impact on future colonization of the area.

== Background ==
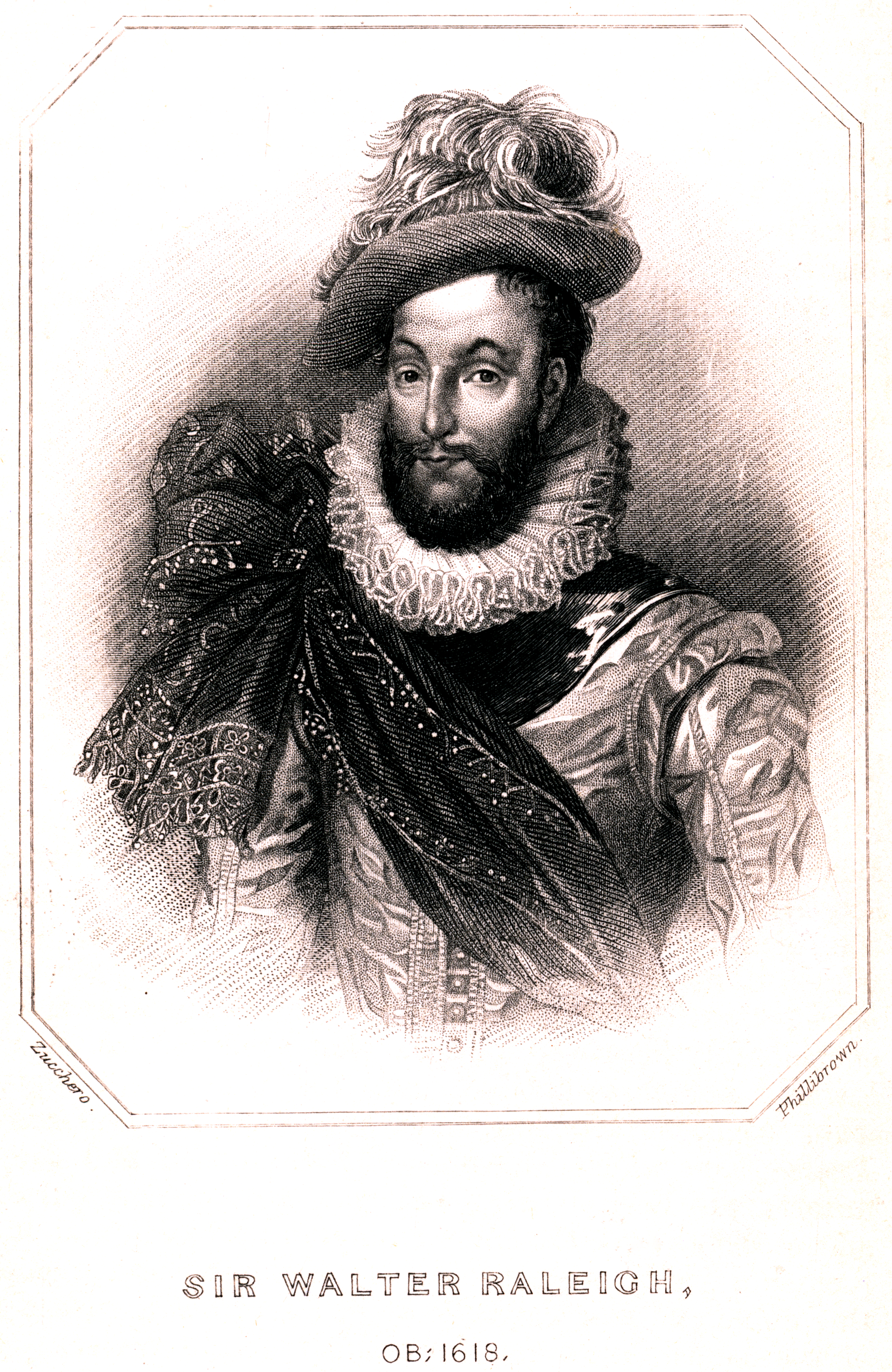
Sir Walter Raleigh

With England at war with Spain in 1585, English privateers had set out to raid Spanish and Portuguese possessions and shipping, and conduct illicit trading. Sir Walter Raleigh had enjoyed several years of high esteem from Queen Elizabeth I, which stemmed in part from his previous exploits at sea which included the famous Capture of the Madre de Deus. Soon after, however, Raleigh suffered a short imprisonment for secretly marrying one of the Queen's ladies-in-waiting, Elizabeth Throckmorton, and bearing her a child. In a bid to restore his influence with the Queen, Raleigh, having promised stuff "gold-rich empire more lucrative than Peru", had set up an expedition under John Whiddon to find the fabled city of gold known as El Dorado, following one of the many old maps which indicated the putative existence of the city. Raleigh aimed to reach Lake Parime in the highlands of Guyana (the supposed location of the city at the time).

Raleigh's fascination began when he captured Pedro Sarmiento de Gamboa, the Spanish governor of Patagonia, in a raid in 1586, who, despite Spain's official policy of keeping all navigational information secret, shared his maps with English cartographers. The biggest discovery was Gamboa's account of Juan Martinez de Albujar, who had taken part in Pedro Maraver de Silva's expedition to the area in 1570, only to fall into the hands of the Caribs of the Lower Orinoco. Martinez claimed that he was taken to the golden city blindfolded and was entertained by the natives, then left the city but could not remember how to return, only remembering a large lake which was nearby. Raleigh wanted to find the mythical city, which he suspected was an actual native Indian city named Manoa near a large lake called Parime. In addition, he hoped to establish an English presence in the Southern Hemisphere that could compete with that of the Spanish and to try to reduce commerce between the natives and Spaniards by forming alliances.

Whiddon sailed to the island of Trinidad in 1594 and was greeted by Antonio de Berrío, the Spanish governor of the island (which had only been established in 1592), and María de Oruña (niece of Gonzalo Jiménez de Quesada). When questions were raised about El Dorado, De Berrío got angry and ordered the execution of the small English party, but Whiddon was allowed to leave to tell the tale to Raleigh. Raleigh immediately organised an expedition in late 1594, of which the first goal was to try and capture de Berrío, who was using the island for the purpose of the exploration of the Orinoco River. The expedition consisted of four ships: the Lion's Whelp under Captain George Giffard, a small Spanish prize named Gallego captained by Lawrence Kemys, Raleigh's own flagship under Captain Jacob Whiddon and Master John Douglas, and a small bark under Captain Cross. On board were 150 officers, soldiers as well as gentleman volunteers. Another two expeditions were hoping to join in. The first expedition, under Robert Dudley and George Popham, had left earlier and the second, led by George Somers and Amyas Preston, left a month later.

== Expedition ==
Raleigh left Plymouth on 6 February 1595, and sailed towards the Azores to take on fresh supplies before the crossing of the Atlantic. Having successfully done so Raleigh was sailing near the Canary Islands where off Tenerife a Spanish ship was captured; the cargo was emptied of which a large amount of firearms was taken. A day later a Flemish ship was captured its cargo too being emptied – 20 hogsheads of Spanish wine.

Raleigh arrived in the Caribbean in late March but had lost contact with two other consorts during the transatlantic crossing and failed to rendezvous with either. The first expedition under Dudley and Popham, who had waited and only departed from the area around 9 February. Between them they had captured many Spanish ships giving them an excuse to head back to England with their prizes. At the same time the Preston Somers Expedition headed further West in a way to distract the Spanish from Raleigh's expedition. They too were supposed to meet up but had also missed the rendezvous. Instead they continued with their expedition and headed towards La Guaira and Coro where they successfully raided. Their greatest prize was when they took Caracas in a daring assault having crossed a pass through the mountains.

=== Capture of Trinidad ===
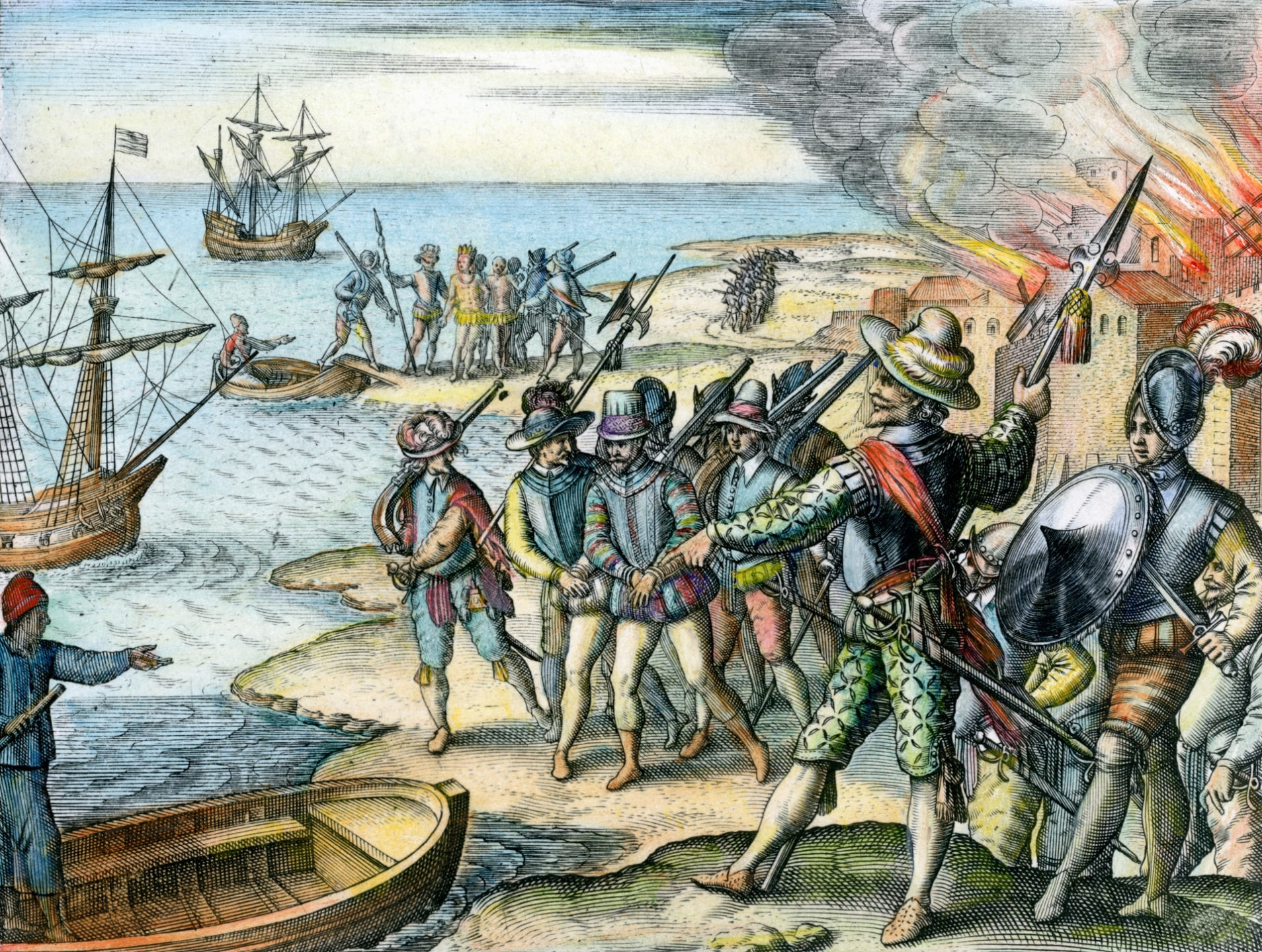
Sir Walter Raleigh's raid on the island of Trinidad in 1595. The captured Spanish Governor, Antonio de Berrío, is being escorted. Engraving by Theodore de Bry.

Raleigh had planned to descend on the Spanish colony of Trinidad – in particular the principal settlement of San José de Oruña, founded by Berrio in 1592. First of all he landed and explored the south of the island Raleigh found that the Indians were cultivating good quality tobacco and sugar cane. While sailing across the Gulf of Paria he reputedly smelled tar, and put into shore at Terra de Brea. The Caribs led Raleigh to a pitch lake (the largest of the world's three natural asphalt lakes) and he realized that the substance was ideal for caulking his ships. He took several barrels with him, and has since been credited with "discovering" the lake. Raleigh's principal objective was to capture the Spanish governor who was also looking for the same fabled city, question him and gain as much information before he continued his expedition.

On 4 April Raleigh disembarked a hundred soldiers and seized the small stockade at Puerto de España overwhelming the small Spanish garrison before pushing inland with the intent to capture San José de Oruña. After arriving just before the town surprise was well on the English side. A night time assault was launched that lasted no more than an hour and the garrison of almost fifty men were put to the sword. The Spanish general Mayor Alvaro Jorge, was captured and taken prisoner but the real prize was the Governor de Berrio. He soon begged the place to be spared and Raleigh agreed and kept the town to use it as a temporary base for an exploration of the Orinoco river. Raleigh also released five native Indian chiefs whom Berrio had bound with one long chain, tortured, and left to starve.

A fort was built in case of any Spanish counterattack while his quest to find the supposed city of El Dorado was to begin. Raleigh interrogated de Berrio and was told what he knew about Manoa and El Dorado, but then tried to discourage the Englishman from continuing on his quest, but his warnings were in vain.

=== Orinoco River basin ===
On 15 April 1595, Raleigh set out from his base in the Gallego, which was cut down for river travel, with a hundred men along with two wherries. They had provisions for nearly a month but they had to set out as quickly as possible – they had heard rumors of a massive Spanish expedition to the area. This rumor turned out to be true; a Spanish force led by a Captain Felipe de Santiago, one of Berrio's trusted officers, with a number of canoes set out from his base at Margarita Island and attempted to shadow Raleigh's expedition. The English entered the Orinoco river basin but the waters were sometimes too shallow and thus the Gallego was modified even more to compensate; and in addition a few rafts were built to reduce weight. As they went further through the river, a myriad of waterways opened up but Raleigh and his men made their way upriver first travelling down the Manamo river.

As the expedition headed further and further Raleigh and his men soon began to suffer from the heat and tropical rains. As the jungle got denser the crew had to hack their way through but a few men became bewildered, including an Indian guide by the name of Ferdinando who vanished, either having escaped or being captured by local natives. Raleigh however soon came across an Indian village where they procured not only a guide but also fish, bread, and fowl. He set off again and the jungle became less dense. Within a few days the savanna country of the Orinoco valley was revealed. Morale was boosted among the crew – one of them, a Black man, decided to swim but was killed and eaten by an Orinoco crocodile in full view of the men. Raleigh noted in horror of this event which shook the crew and then realized the river here was teeming with the reptiles and ordered his crew not to take any chances.

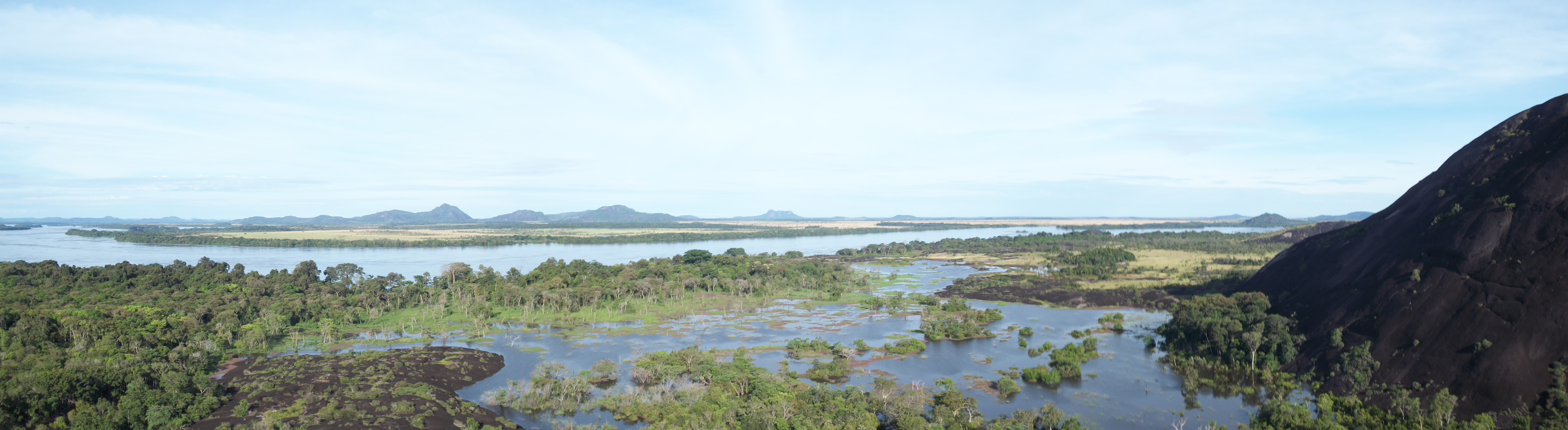
Panorama of the Orinoco in the savanna region

=== Spanish surprise attack ===
On April 27, the Spanish under Santiago, who were still shadowing Raleigh's expedition, decided to surprise the English when their rear echelon became separated after getting fresh water. Having sent the four canoes they crept up on the English but surprise was lost when they became trapped in a narrow channel in a bend in the river. The English, although surprised, quickly took advantage and Gifford with his boats launched a counterattack and overpowered the Spanish. The Spanish had a number of casualties compared to the English, who were without loss, and the remainder fled into the woods. Gifford then took the boats as prizes. Raleigh and the rest of the boats having heard shots and shouts came up and forced the remaining two Spanish canoes to disappear from sight. Raleigh sent a small force of men to chase the Spanish who also fled into the woods. The English troops caught up with three Indians whom they captured. The Indians, thinking they were Spaniards, begged for their lives, with one of the trio agreeing to be their guide.

Santiago after this defeat decided to give up, and returned to his base at Margarita Island. The captured Spanish canoes had much needed food and supplies which were put to good use, but also found were tools for finding various types of ores.

=== Caroni river to Mount Roraima ===
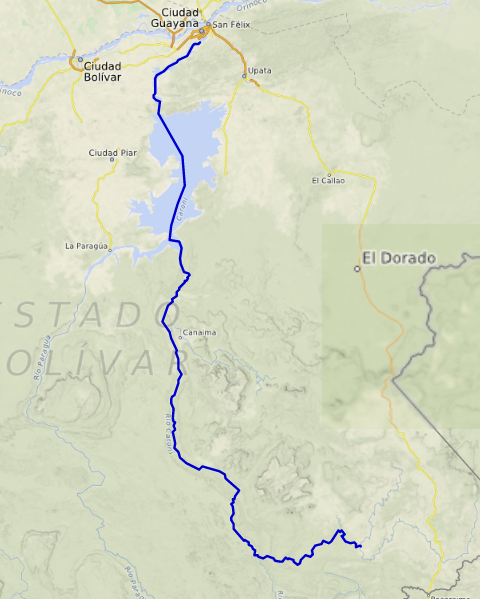
Map showing the 952 kilometres (592 mi) long Caroni river

A day later Raleigh's expedition soon came across a large confluence of the river. This was the Caroni River. Here Raleigh encountered the indigenous Amerindians; first the Warao people and the Pemons. After showing their victory over the Spaniards by presenting a captured Spanish canoe, the English successfully established peaceful relations with them. A large village was found, possibly near present-day Ciudad Guayana, ruled by an aged chieftain named Topiawari – Raleigh made friends by announcing that he was an enemy of the Spanish, who were widely detested by the natives. Topiawari told Raleigh of a rich culture living in the mountains who easily convinced himself that the culture was an offshoot of the rich Inca culture of Peru and that it must be the fabled city of Manoa. Raleigh left two of his men to become hostages and Raleigh took Topiawari's son in return. With this friendship an alliance was forged with them against the Spaniards. Some of the ships stayed at the village to replenish for the voyage home while Raleigh and Kemys continued on with Topiawari's son as a guide. They went up the Caroní River, sending out scouts to look for gold and mines, all the while making alliances with any natives they encountered. His scouts brought back rocks, hoping that further analysis would reveal gold ore.

As they pushed further Raleigh noted a change on the landscape and described a tepuy (table top mountain). He saw and recorded the largest, Mount Roraima, its 31 km^{2} summit area bounded on all sides by cliffs rising 400 metres (1,300 ft). In addition, Raleigh observed around twelve waterfalls but noted the largest "higher than any church spire" he had seen—they disembarked and walked on foot to get a closer view and described the surrounding area as the most beautiful he had seen. There could be a claim that Raleigh may have been the first European to view Angel Falls, although these claims are considered farfetched.

By this time the expedition had traveled nearly 400 miles (640 km) inland and the rainy season had begun. Raleigh decided he had done enough, and gave the order to turn back. They returned to Topiawari's village, whose son agreed to come back to England with Raleigh, who christened him Gualtero. Having joined the other crew left there, Raleigh set off back to Trinidad but on his way learnt from a cacique of a gold mine near Mount Iconuri and sent Lawrence Keymis with a small detachment to investigate. Keymis neared the place, which was actually a few miles from Santo Tomas; he observed a large waterfall (today Llovizna Falls) and though he did not see the mine, by the quality of quartz rock he saw and kept, he warranted that the place was of value.

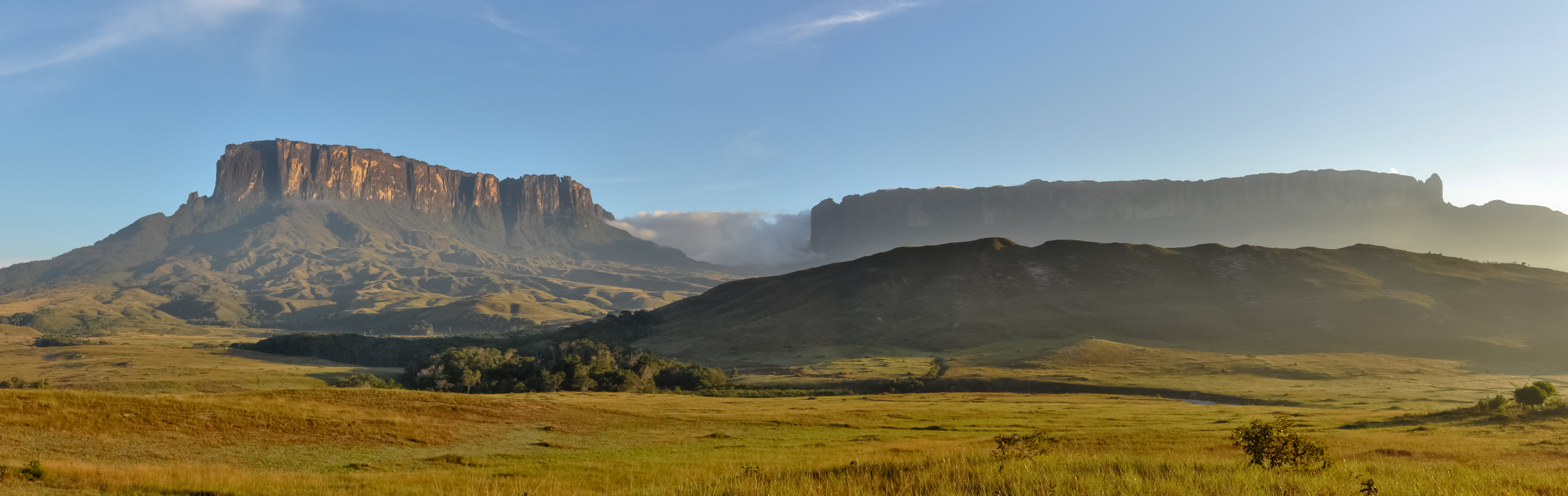
Mount Roraima in the Guiana highlands

=== Return to Trinidad ===
Raleigh returned to San Jose and remarkably, apart from the crocodile attack, he had lost no men; in fact his crew was fairly healthy, partly because of the native Indian diet. As he arrived at the fort the decision was made to return to England but before doing so everything of value was taken from the place and it was burnt to the ground despite de Berrío's protests. Raleigh landed on Margarita Island and successfully plundered for supplies and then landed at the port of Cumaná, where he left de Berrío ashore after he was unable to get a ransom. He finally descended upon Riohacha, which he also sacked and plundered.

On July 13, Raleigh finally met up with Preston and Somers and was told of their remarkable exploits in capturing Caracas, La Guaira, and Coro. Contrary winds forced them to abandon the idea of seeking the colony of Roanoke and all arrived in England by the end of August 1595.

== Aftermath ==
Raleigh arrived in England, but he was received with lackluster praise. Cecil was disappointed with the lack of booty and gold considering he had invested so much in the expedition. A London Alderman had the rocks examined and considered them worthless even though they contained reliable assays of gold. He was accused by others that he had hidden the gold in remote regions in Devon and Cornwall. With these claims Raleigh was infuriated and decided to then write and publish an overblown account of the expedition under the title of The Discovery of rich and beautiful empire of Guiana, a work that somewhat exaggerated the whole region.

Despite this, the book became popular not just in England but France and the Netherlands. Raleigh sent Kemys back to Guyana the following year to check up on the hostages and to renew the alliance with the native Indians. He also needed to map the Orinoco, record the Amerindian tribes, and prepare geographical, geological, and botanical reports of the country. Kemys this time went much further inland along the banks of the Essequibo River and reached what he wrongly believed to be Lake Parime. He wrote about the coast of Guiana in detail in his Relation of the Second Voyage to Guiana after his return.

De Berrío the same year also set out with a Spanish expedition of his own with 470 men under command of Domingo de Vera Ibargoyen to search for El Dorado. As they advanced further inland however the Amerindians, now allied to England, attacked and destroyed Vera and Berrio's entire force losing 350 men. The rest tried to retreat but soon after disease and famine reduced the survivors to only a handful of men.

After being released from prison by order of King James I in 1617, Raleigh returned to continue his quest for El Dorado on a second expedition but was to avoid any conflict with the Spanish. Along with Kemys and his son, Watt Raleigh, they were to have another search for the supposed gold mine at Mount Iconuri. However, Raleigh by now ill stayed behind in a camp on the island of Trinidad. Kemys remounted the Orinoco river and Watt was killed in a battle with the Spaniards as they destroyed and sacked the Spanish settlement at Santo Tome de Guayana. No gold was found and Kemys, disheartened by this and feeling responsible for the death of Walter's son, subsequently committed suicide.

In fact, Kemys had already informed Raleigh by letter of the unfolding disaster and the death of his son. He went to Raleigh's cabin to beg forgiveness, but found Raleigh unable to grant him this. In Raleigh's words "I told him that he had undone me by his obstinacy, and that I would not favour... in any sort his former follie". Kemys reportedly replied "I know then, Sir, what course to take," before returning to his own cabin. Kemys then committed suicide by shooting himself in the chest with a pistol, then when that did not prove immediately fatal, stabbing himself in the heart with a knife. Upon Raleigh's return to England, King James ordered him to be beheaded for disobeying orders to avoid conflict with the Spanish. He was executed in 1618.

In 1713, Spain and Great Britain signed the Treaty of Utrecht, whereby the British agreed to prevent their citizens from visiting Spanish colonies in Latin America without prior approval from colonial officials. With the aggressive stance adopted by the Indians towards the hated Spanish, the Spaniards never returned in force to the region. This allowed other European countries (France, Britain and the Dutch Republic) to establish colonies in the area over the next two centuries with the creations of Dutch Guyana, French Guiana, and British Guyana. By the early 19th century, as more explorers came to the region, Lake Parime's existence was definitively disproved and there was a theory that the seasonal flooding of the Rupununi savannah may have been misidentified as such.

The gold mine at El Callao (Venezuela), started in 1871 a few miles south of Orinoco River, was for a time one of the richest in the world, and the goldfields as a whole saw over a million ounces exported between 1860 and 1883. The immigrants who came to the gold mines in Venezuela were mostly from the British Isles and the British West Indies.

The Orinoco Mining Arc (OMA), officially created on February 24, 2016 as the Arco Mining Orinoco National Strategic Development Zone, is an area rich in mineral resources that the Republic of Venezuela has been operating since 2017; it occupies mostly the north of the Bolivar state and to a lesser extent the northeast of the Amazonas state and part of the Delta Amacuro state. It has 7,000 tons of reserves of gold, copper, diamond, coltan, iron, bauxite, and other minerals.

== Legacy ==
- In 1953, a Trinidad and Tobago postage stamp featured the Discovery of Lake Asphalt by Raleigh, 1595.
- In 1976, the Republic of Guyana issued a 100-dollar gold coin commemorating the book Discovery of Guiana 1596 and 10 Years of Independence from British Rule.

== Bibliography ==
- Aronson, Marc (2000). Sir Walter Ralegh and the Quest for El Dorado. Houghton Mifflin Harcourt. ISBN 9780395848272.
- Bicheno, Hugh (2012). Elizabeth's Sea Dogs: How England's Mariners Became the Scourge of the Seas. Conway. ISBN 9781844861743.
- Bradley, Peter T (2010). British Maritime Enterprise in the New World: From the Late Fifteenth to the Mid-eighteenth Century. Edwin Mellen Press Ltd. ISBN 9780773478664.
- Elliott, Anthony (1999). Freud 2000. Psychology Press. ISBN 9780415922531.
- Nicholl, Charles (1995). The Creature in the Map: A Journey to El Dorado. William Morrow and Company. ISBN 9780688146009.
- Nicholls & Williams, Mark & Penry (2011). Sir Walter Raleigh: In Life and Legend. Continuum. ISBN 9781441112095.
- Marley, David (2008). Wars of the Americas: A Chronology of Armed Conflict in the Western Hemisphere. ABC CLIO. ISBN 9781598841008.
- Sellin, Paul R. (2011). Treasure, Treason and the Tower: El Dorado and the Murder of Sir Walter Raleigh. Ashgate Publishing, Ltd. ISBN 9781409420255.
- Stebbing, William (2014). Sir Walter Raleigh: A Biography. SEVERUS Verlag. ISBN 9783863473211.
- Wallace, Willard Mosher (2015). Sir Walter Raleigh. Princeton University Press. ISBN 9781400879007.
