= Amyas Preston =

English privateer (died 1609)

Amyas Preston (died 1609) was an English privateer of the Elizabethan period. His career was largely spent in the Caribbean, as were other more famous corsairs of the age such as Francis Drake, John Hawkins and Walter Raleigh. He is principally remembered for his participation in the Battle of Gravelines against the Spanish Armada in 1588, as well as the Preston–Somers expedition in 1595.

== Biography ==
=== Early life ===
Little is known about Preston's family and upbringing, but he is believed to have come from Cricket St Thomas in Somerset. In 1581 he married a London widow called Julian Burye. He first saw combat in 1588, during the English victory over the Spanish Armada near Calais, where he was wounded and gained a certain level of renown for his actions.

=== Capture of Caracas ===
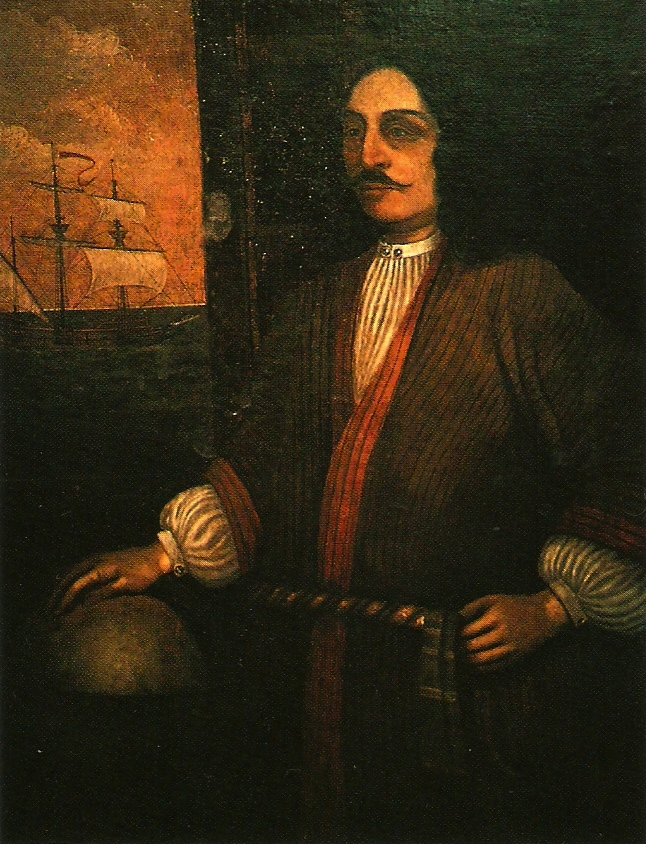
Sir George Somers, the co-leader of Preston's expedition

In 1595, he took part in the Preston Somers Expedition, co-lead with George Somers, which was initially supposed to join Walter Raleigh's El Dorado Expedition. After failing to meet with Raleigh at Trinidad, the expedition ventured on its own along the coast of Spanish Venezuela Province, capturing first the fort of La Guaira and later the colonial city of Caracas.

After the Spanish failed to pay their ransom, Preston and Somers order the pillaging and torching of the city, and went on to capture Coro. They finished the expedition with a brief incursion into the Spanish West Indies, but cut short any future actions following a bout of dysentery among the crew which saw 80 mean death and a plummeting morale. They returned to safe ports in English-held water via Jamaica and the Cayman Islands. They later met and joined Raleigh's flotilla and sailed back to England via Newfoundland.

=== Later life ===
In the following years Preston undertook a number of smaller, often financially unsuccessful, expeditions such as the capture of Cádiz and an expedition to the Azores known as the Islands Voyage. For his bravery during the fighting for Cádiz he was knighted by either Robert Devereux, 2nd Earl of Essex or Charles Howard, 1st Earl of Nottingham, the expedition's two commanders. Around 1601 he had a falling out with Raleigh, tensions reaching the point where Preston challenged Raleigh to a duel, but the two later reconciled. Preston was vice-admiral as part of the blockade of Kinsale when the Spanish made landfall there in 1601. The latter surrendered after the Battle of Kinsale.

In 1603, he was appointed quartermaster of the Tower of London, a position he held until his death in 1609. Shortly before his death he also held a position on the council for the Virginia Company.
