= History of Tétouan =

The history of Tétouan (or Tetouan) stretches over 2000 years to its origins as a Mauretanian Berber settlement named Tamuda, located at near present-day Tetouan by the south bank of the Martil Valley. The site later became a Phoenician trading post. During the time of Emperor Augustus, Tamuda became part of Roman province Mauritania Tingitana.

In 1286, the Marinids built a casbah and mosque there. The first large scale building project took place in 1305 when the settlement was expanded by the Marinid king Abu Thabit Amir. The city was later rebuilt and fortified by Ali al-Mandri.

Tetouan is a renowned multicultural center. The medina of Tetouan is a UNESCO World Heritage Site since 1997. It has also been part of the UNESCO Creative Cities Network in the area of Crafts and Folk Art since 2017. It is currently a city of 380,787, the 11th largest in Morocco and part of Tanger-Tetouan-Al Hoceima administrative region.

== Historiography ==
According to Muhammad Ibn Azzuz Hakim, the first to attempt to write a history of Tetuan was by Abdessalam as-Sukayrij (d. 1834), author of the manuscript نزهة الاخوان وسلوة الأحزان في الأخبار الواردة في بناء تطوان ومن حكم فيه أو تقرر من الأعيان. The second history of Tetuan was Aḥmad bin Muḥammad ar-Rahūnī t-Tiṭwānī's 10-volume work عمدة الراوين في تاريخ تطاوين. The third was Mohammed Daoud's multi-volume تاريخ تطوان [History of Tetuan], which Hakim considered a formidable work though it had gaps and errors and therefore could not be considered conclusive. Hakim described Daoud's work as an encyclopedia project, though it was not organized alphabetically, and he criticized it for only rarely engaging non-Arabic sources.

== Phoenician and Roman presence ==
A few miles outside of the city limits lies the ancient town of Tamuda. Early settlements at the outskirts of the actual city by Mauretanian Berbers date back to the 3rd century BC. Artifacts from both the Phoenician and the Roman era have been found in the site of Tamuda. A type of seahorse with rider encountered on a clay disk, representing Punic iconography, was found at the site. It became a Roman colony under Emperor Augustus.

== Rebuilding the city-state ==
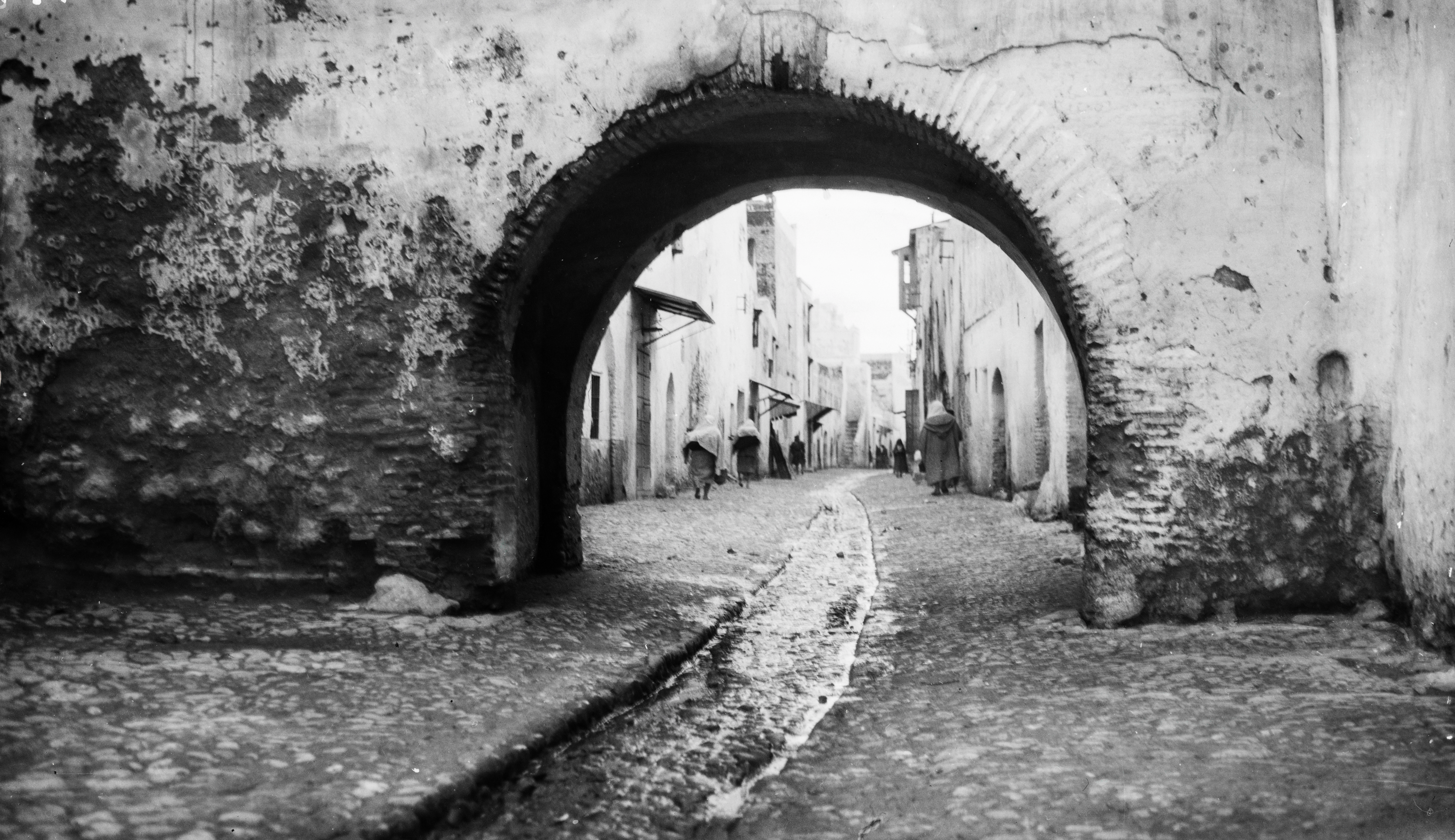
A street in the old medina - Photograph by Swiss aviator and photographer Walter Mittelholzer (1928)

In 1286, the Marinids built a casbah and mosque there. The first large scale building project took place in 1305 when the settlement was expanded by the Marinid king Abu Thabit Amir. He fortified the place and had it serve as a base for attacks on Ceuta, which had recently come under the rule of a rebellious member of the Marinid dynasty.

In 1399, it was sacked and many were enslaved by Castile because pirates used it as a base for their retaliatory attacks.

The Portuguese were already occupying the neighboring Ceuta and in 1436, its commander Pedro de Meneses, 1st Count of Vila Real dispatched a detachment of his garrison under his son, Duarte, to raid Tetouan, which was still recovering from the Castilian destruction, in order to prevent it from becoming a threat to future operations by the Portuguese Empire. But this did not seem to affect the strengthening of Tetouan's defenses.

Tetouan would be rebuilt at the end of the 15th century, although there are different versions concerning the specific date. On one hand there is an ancient Arabic manuscript and on the other there is the account of the seventeenth century Moroccan historian Sidi al-Arbi al-Fasi. They offer mixed chronological data. According to the first of the aforementioned sources, the foundation had to take place between 1483 and 1484, while the second source sets the event, with extreme accuracy, on the 7th day of the Islamic month of Sha'ban of the Hijri year 898, a date that corresponds to Friday, May 24, 1493; a year after the surrender of Granada. This second chronology does not support the assertions of Leo Africanus, which states that "the ruins of Tetouan, deserted for ninety-five years, would be rebuilt and populated by the Granadine al-Mandri, who presented himself to the Sultan of Fez after being expelled from Spain by Ferdinand II of Aragon."

However, due to certain events, such as the capture of the bride of al-Mandari by Íñigo López de Mendoza, 1st count of Tendilla and his retention in the fortress of Alcalá la Real, it can be stated that prior to the last date mentioned, al-Mandari was already, duly fortified, in Tetouan.

Tetouan "for many years ... laid in ruins ... was populated by Muslim refugees from the Kingdom of Granada, who fled the growing impetus of the Castilians." By the end of the fifteenth century, it was rebuilt by refugees from the Reconquista (reconquest of Spain, completed by the fall of Granada in 1492), when the Andalusi Moors first raised the walls and then filled the enclosure with houses. These Andalusians came into conflict with the Jebala of the Beni Hozmar, after which they asked the Wattasid sultan for protection. In response, he sent 80 soldiers (according to one chronicle, 40 natives of Fez and 40 Rifians). In turn, the Andalusians paid a large amount of mithqal, thus insuring their autonomy. Immediately, the Andalusians, assisted by tribes from the surrounding mountains, started harassing the Spanish possessions on the Moroccan coast. These attacks led to the destruction of the city's harbor by the Spanish in 1565. During this time city was governed by the Andalusian Abu Hassan al-Mandri and the city remained autonomous from the Saadi Sultanate, with the Saadis constantly trying to assert their power.

== Piracy and Mazmorras ==
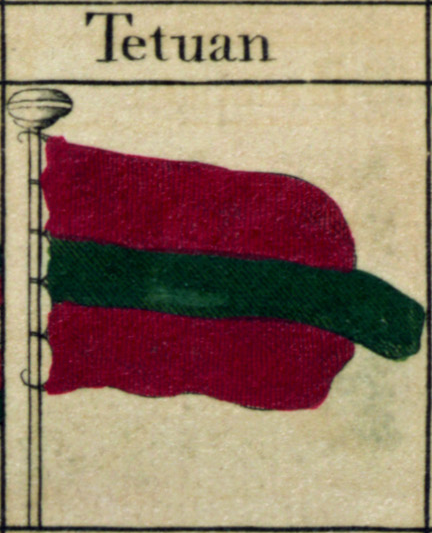
Naval flag of Tetouan (1783)

This period can be understood within geopolitical and religious contexts. The Ottomans had just captured Constantinople in 1453 marking the end of the Byzantine Empire. The Portuguese started their colonial conquest by capturing some ports at the western coast of Morocco in 1487. A few years later, Granada was falling into the hands of the Catholic Monarchs of Spain Isabella I of Castile and Ferdinand II of Aragon and with that, forced conversions of Muslims in Spain followed.

As early as the 1530s and 1540s, at the time when Spain and the Ottoman Empire were disputing control over the western part of the Mediterranean, piracy was spreading and soon Tetouan became one of the main centers of the piracy in the region. Corsairs considered it as a form of retaliation against the Spanish Reconquista that led to the loss of their homes back in al-Andalus especially that the timing coincided with the first Morisco influx to Tetouan due to the forced conversions they faced in Spain between 1501 and 1526. Their collaborators included English and Dutch renegades who were mostly Protestants although a few had converted to Islam.

While the harbor served as a port from where piracy missions were launched, captives were taken to dungeons. They were underground prisoner complexes with a series of connected excavated caves called mazmorras. The captives were faced with being sold to the slavery market if ransoms were not paid. These subterranean installations were rediscovered in the early 20th century. A chapel 90 square meters large and a few altars were also uncovered. This sacred site, named Nuestra Señora de los Dolores "Our Lady of Sorrows", was used by the captives and redeemers like their relatives or Spanish Franciscans and Portuguese Jesuits who used to make frequent visits to negotiate the Christian captives' freedom.

Miguel de Cervantes, himself a captive in Algiers between 1575–80, refers to mazmorras in El juez de los divorcios "The Divorce Judge", where the protagonist compares his marriage to "captivity in Tetouan's caves." He also did it in Don Quixote, in addition to talking about Tetouan in El trato de Argel, La gran sultana and La ilustre fregona. It is believed that he had contact with some incarcerated who told him about the hardness of the dungeons of Tetouan. Diplomat and explorer Leo Africanus, while visiting the city, mentions in his book Description of Africa that there were 3000 captives although some historians dispute that figure. Other accounts came from captives themselves such as Germain Moüette who spoke of horrible conditions lived inside those mazmorras in the late 17th century. Piracy continued and in 1829, the Austrian Empire bombarded the city as a reprisal.

The underground prison was explored in 1922 by Cesar Luis de Montalban based on a report by archeologist Manuel Gómez-Moreno Martínez. The Spanish Protectorate administration then commissioned architect Carlos Ovilo to study the site but they found out that no excavation could be possible without taking the risk of damaging the housing above the site. Since then, no excavation was made although, recently, some researchers and civil associations are calling for the authorities to extend exploration and restoration before opening it to the public.

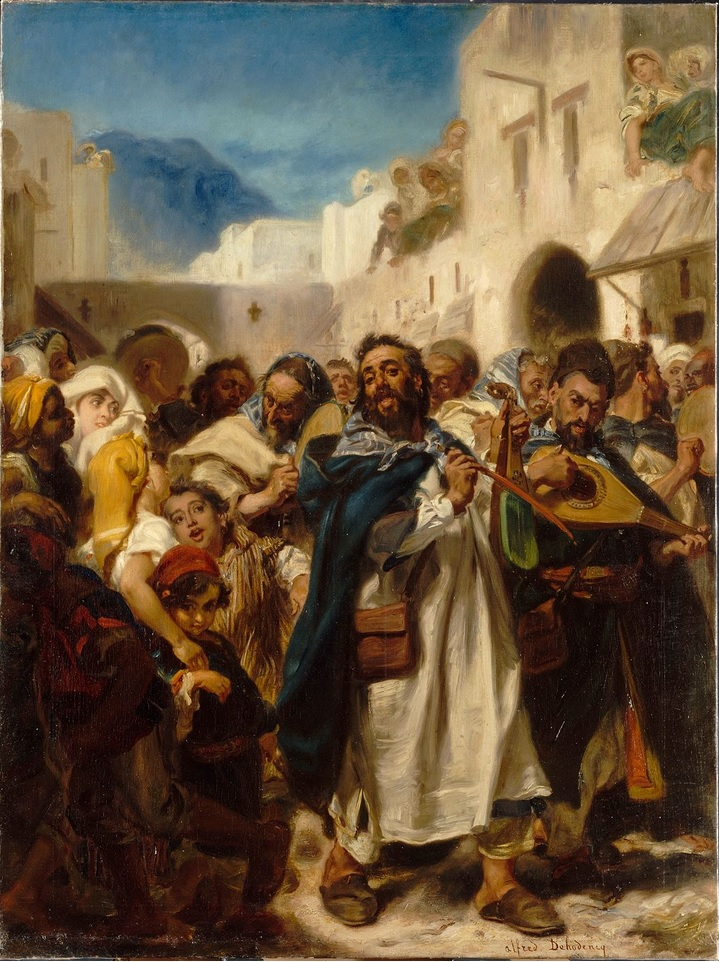
Jewish Festival in Tetouan - Painting by French artist Alfred Dehodencq (1865)

== Jewish community ==
Tetouan has been home to a significant Sephardi Jewish community which immigrated from Spain after the Reconquista and the Spanish Inquisition. This Jewish Sephardi community spoke a form of Judaeo-Spanish known as Haketia.

In 1790, Sultan Yazid initiated a massacre of the local Jewish community. The Jews lived in a mellah, which is located inside the old medina. Another massacre of Jews took place in the town in 1860 in the wake of the Hispano–Moroccan War (1859–1860).

By 1860, there were a total of sixteen synagogues in Tetouan although some accounts talk about eighteen. Following the migration of Moroccan Jews to Israel, there are very few Jews left in Tetouan. By 1967, only twelve remained. During that period, many emigrated to South America and much later to Israel, Spain, France and Canada. Today, the only synagogue remaining is that of Rabbi Isaac Bengualid which serves as a museum.

The Paris-based international Jewish organization Alliance Israélite Universelle opened its first school in Tetouan in 1862.

Jews of Tetouan have their own cemetery. It is more than 500 years old, with approximately 35,000 tombstones, making it the largest Jewish cemetery in Morocco.

== Late military history ==
In the 17th century, the city was governed by the wealthy al-Naksis family. At the end of the century, the city was taken by the Alawi sultan Moulay Ismail who encountered fierce resistance. Tetouan remained fragile, until it was taken by Ahmad al-Riffi, the Alawi governor of Tangier and leader of the Berber army Jaysh al-Rifi that had conquered Tangier from the British. Al-Riffi ushered in a period of stability in Tetouan, building many of Tetouan's landmarks such as the Meshwar palace and the Pasha mosque, the oldest still standing mosque in Tetouan. After his death, the city again rebelled and was only nominally controlled by the central government.

Elements of military constructions can be found in the original fortifications such as the three forts, the seven gates and the large outer walls that surround the old media. They have survived despite the changes that occurred through the expansions known to the city during multiple periods.

== Hispano-Moroccan War and the Spanish Protectorate ==
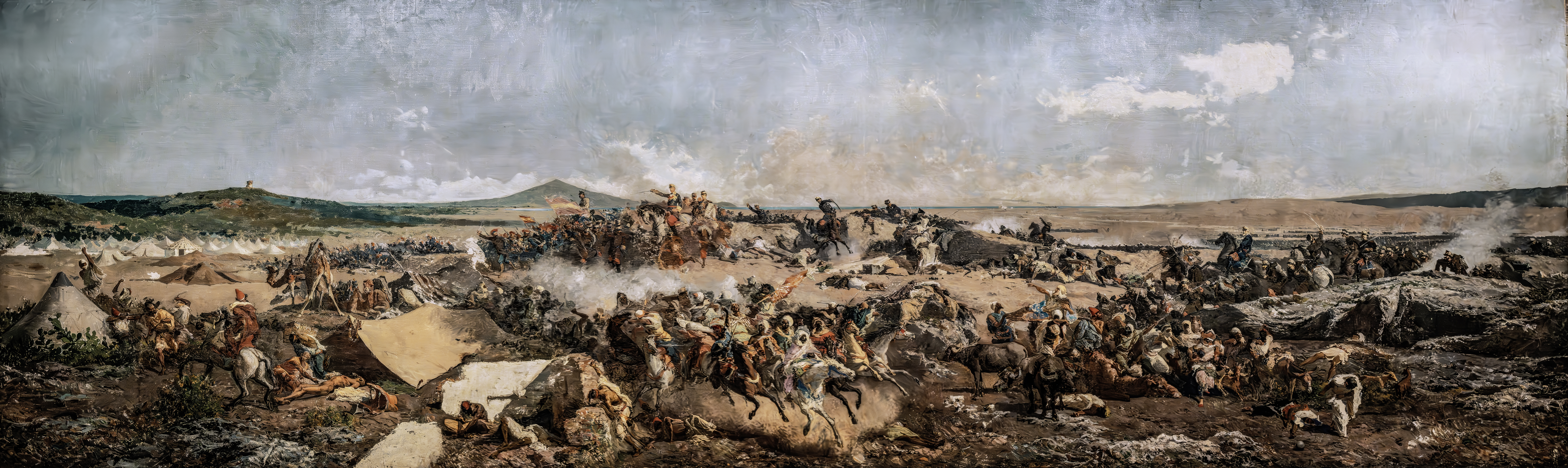
The Battle of Tetuan, part of The 1st Conde de Lucena's Moroccan campaigns on behalf of Spain's Queen Isabella II in the early 1860s, painted by Marià Fortuny (Museu Nacional d'Art de Catalunya)

In 1844, Morocco lost its war against the French and in 1856, it signed the "Anglo-Moroccan treaties of Friendship" with the British. The Spaniards saw the Moroccan defeat in 1844 and the 1856 treaties with the British as a sign of weakness. Spurred by a national passion for African conquest, the Spaniards declared war on Morocco in 1859 after a conflict over the borders of the Ceuta.

After a few months, Tetouan was taken on 4 February 1860 under the command of General Leopoldo O'Donnell who was a descendant of an old Irish royal family, the O'Donnells of Tyrconnell. He was made hereditary Duque de Tetuán, and later served as Prime Minister of Spain. However, the Spanish evacuated in May 1862.

In 1913, it became the capital of the Spanish protectorate of Morocco, which was governed by the Khalifa (Moroccan prince, serving as Viceroy for the Sultan), and the Spanish "Alto Comisario" accredited to him, and it remained its capital until 1956. The High Commissioner and the Khalifa had their respective residences in two adjacent palaces, which now form the Royal Palace of Tétouan.

== The nationalist movement ==
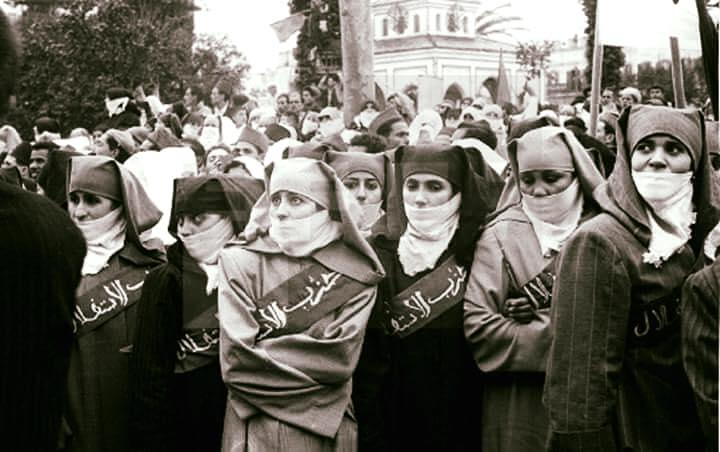
Tetouani women affiliated with Istiqlal Party

Tetouan was one of the most active Moroccan cities in resisting colonialism. The nationalist movement in Tetouan was led by the charismatic leader Abdelkhalek Torres and other personalities such as Abdessalam Bennuna and historian Mohammed Daoud. The movement was part of the pan-Arab nationalist movements. The movement established deep ties with Arab nationalist leaders such as former Egyptian President Gamal Abdel Nasser and Druze prince and intellectual Shakib Arslan. When Arsalan wanted to visit Morocco in August 1930 he was not given permit by the French protectorate but then went to Tangier, then having international status under foreign colonial powers, and from there to Tetouan where he met the group. Many of the members later joined the National Party for Istiqlal. Others joined some other nationalist parties and many members were women.

== Modern history ==
Tetouan was further expanded when it became the capital of the Spanish protectorate in Morocco between 1913 and 1956. The Spanish administration built several new neighborhoods outside the walled medina. The city underwent an intense urban transformation for which its new neighborhoods and buildings, called "Ensanche" (meaning extension), acquired an image very similar to those of other Spanish cities of the time. Its structure was organized around a large circular plaza, now called 'Plaza Mulay el Mehdi' (formerly Plaza Primo de Rivera). The influence of the protectorate has remained important even after the independence of the country in 1956.

In January 1984, and in the midst of the Years of Lead under the reign of late King Hassan II, a revolt spread into several cities for several days due to price hikes concerning basic goods following the implementation of the International Monetary Fund and the World Bank Structural adjustment programme before it was thwarted by a military intervention. Twenty people were killed in Tetouan and many others were arrested and received heavy sentences.

Many people in the city still speak Spanish. On road signs often names are written both in Spanish and in Arabic, though many signs are in Arabic and French, the second language of modern Morocco.
