= Blockade of the Tetuan River =

1565 Spanish military operation in Morocco

- Part of Spanish-Moroccan conflicts
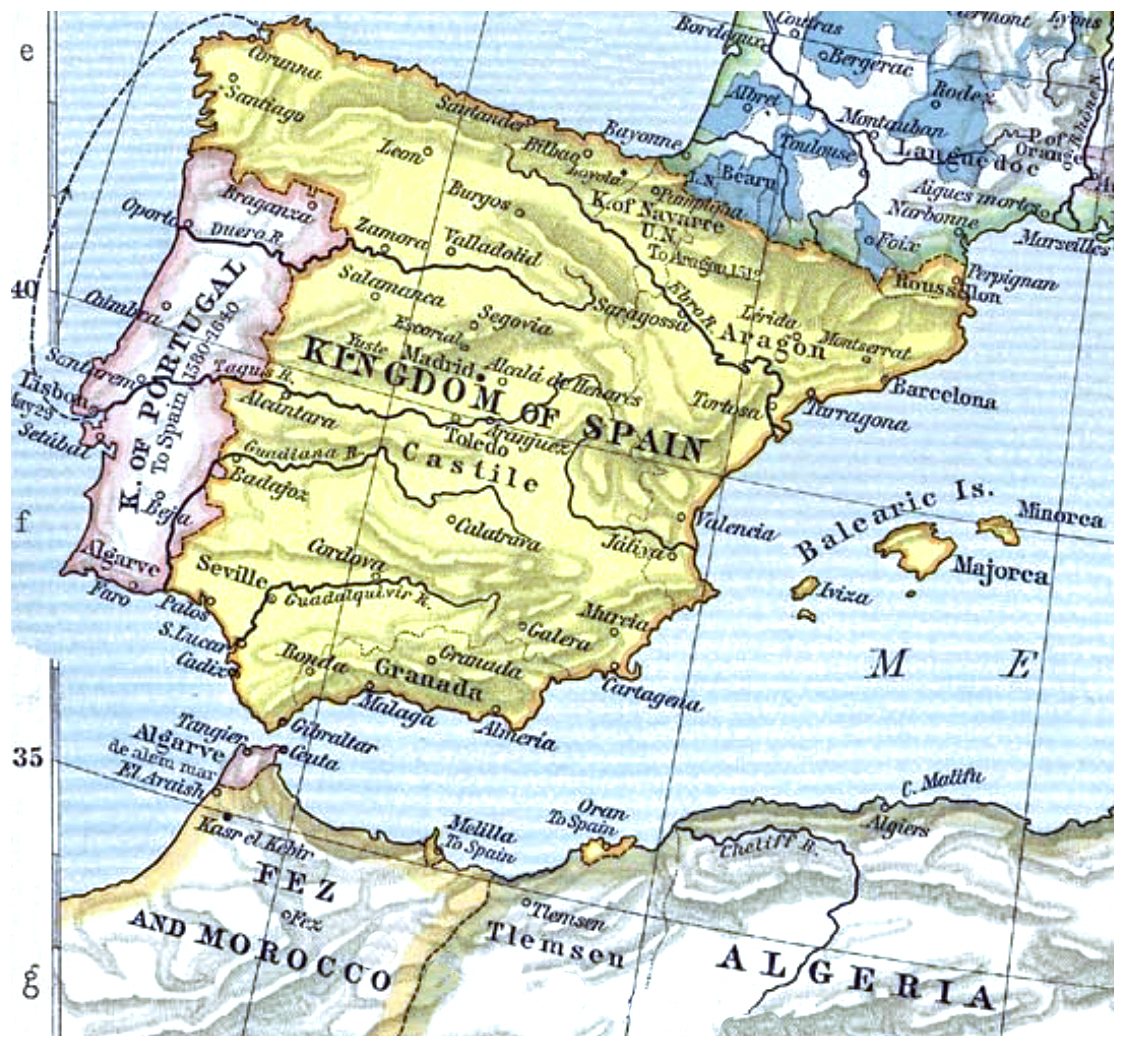
- Map of the western Mediterranean c. 1560
Date	8 March 1565
Location	Tetuan River, Morocco 35°37′N 5°16′W
Result	Spanish–Portuguese victory

Belligerents
Spanish Empire (Portuguese Empire) Portugal	Saadi Sultanate; Ottoman Empire

Commanders and leaders
(Spanish Empire) Álvaro de Bazán (Spanish Empire) Alonso de Bazán (Spanish Empire) Esteban de Guillisastegui (WIA)	Governor of Tetouan

Strength
5 galleys 6 brigantines (4 Spanish and 2 Portuguese); 4 caravels 1 galiot 3 chalupas At least 150 Spanish arquebusiers 300 Portuguese soldiers	At least 2 Ottoman galleons At least 3 chalupas 12 flotillas At least 9 brigantines 1,000 horsemen 4,000 soldiers

Casualties and losses
4 killed 30 wounded	100 killed or wounded 9 brigantines sunk

The Blockade of the Tetuan River (Spanish: Jornada del Rio de Tetuán) on 8 March 1565 was a successful Spanish blockade of the Tetuan River (present-day Martil river) against the Saadi Sultanate. The Spanish forces were led by Álvaro de Bazán, Alonso de Bazán and Esteban de Guillisastegui, who was wounded during the operation.

== Background ==
In the summer of 1564, Spain and its allies gathered a large fleet and launched an expedition against Peñón de Vélez de la Gomera, then held by the Ottoman Empire. They laid siege to the fortress and fell after one week. Following this, it was proposed to Philip II of Spain to blockade the mouth of the Tetuan River to prevent the passage of Barbary corsairs to Tetouan, which was one of their main bases, to secure the Strait of Gibraltar. He accepted and chose Álvaro de Bazán as the main commander of the operation.

== Blockade ==
=== Preparations ===
The fleet sailed from Sanlúcar de Barrameda on 12 February and headed to Peñón de Vélez de la Gomera. However, two English carracks, who were going from the Loukkos River to Larache, saw the Spanish fleet and somehow found out about the operation so they informed the Saadians about it. He arrived at Ceuta shortly after, where he contacted the Portuguese governor to distract the Saadians by simulating an attack on their territory so he could carry out the attack on the Tetuan River. The governor also sent 300 Portuguese soldiers and two more brigantines to help Álvaro de Bazán with the campaign. Reinforcements from Gibraltar arrived in Ceuta on 6 March. Two days later, on 8 March, Álvaro de Bazán left the city and arrived at the mouth of the river. The fleet was composed of five galleys, six brigantines, four caravels, one galiot and three chalupas.

=== Operations ===
Upon arrival, Álvaro de Bazán towed six galleys with six large barges to begin with the reconnaissance operations. However, they were attacked by soldiers from Tetouan commanded by the governor of the city to hinder the operations, firing on the brigs and skiffs conducting them. Alonso de Bazán was forced to disembark with 400 arquebusiers to contain them by skirmishing. Esteban de Guillisastegui filled the barges with large stones and hydraulic mortar, making it difficult to overcome the current and bring them to the spot where they were sank in a line. The galleys and brigs unloaded the loose stones they had been carrying onto them which formed a seawall on which "one could cross from one side of the river to the other without getting one's knees wet." 4,000 Saadian and Ottoman arquebusiers, 1,000 horsemen and 2 Ottoman galleons arrived and attacked the sailors in the skiffs and the soldiers on land while they were re-embarking and, after half an hour of battle, the Spaniards and Portuguese managed to repel the Saadians and Ottomans, consolidating the blockade of the river. This battle caused more than 100 dead and wounded among the Saadians and Ottomans and 4 dead and 30 wounded between the Spanish and Portuguese troops.

== Aftermath ==
Following the campaign, Spain secured control of the river during the winter. Two days later, on 10 March 1565, Álvaro de Bazán arrived in Ceuta, where he sent a letter to Philip II of Spain informing him of the events of the campaign. He ordered the wounded to be treated, ship parts repaired, and a search for Ottoman galleys leaving Algiers to be prepared. Afterwards they went to Tangier to disembark the Portuguese troops that helped in the operation and, finally, the fleet arrived in Cádiz.

== Bibliography ==
- de Altolaguirre y Duvale, Angel (1888). Don Alvaro de Bazán, primer marqués de Santa Cruz de Mudela: Estudio histórico-biográfico premiado por unanimidad de votos en el certamen celebrado en Madrid el 9 de febrero de 1888, para conmemorar el tercer centenario de la muerte del invicto marino (in Spanish). Tipografía de los huérfanos.
- Prescott, William Hickling (1883). History of the Reign of Philip the Second, King of Spain. J. B. Lippincott & Co.
- Fernández Duro, Cesáreo (1972). "Sitio de Malta". Armada Española desde la unión de los reinos de Castilla y de Aragón (PDF) (in Spanish). Vol. 2. Instituto de Historia y Cultura Naval.
- Batis, Huberto (1984). Estética de lo obsceno y otras exploraciones pornotópicas (in Spanish). Universidad Autónoma del Estado de México. ISBN 978-968-5140-26-3.
- Rodríguez González, Agustín R. (22 September 2017). Álvaro de Bazán: Capitán general del Mar Océano (in Spanish). ISBN 978-84-414-3803-3.
- Braudel, Fernand (25 July 2023). The Mediterranean and the Mediterranean World in the Age of Philip II: Volume II. Univ of California Press. ISBN 978-0-520-40066-5.
- Nicieza, Guillermo (16 June 2025). Almirantes del Imperio: Los grandes comandantes de las Armadas españolas del siglo XVI. ISBN 978-84-414-4448-5.
- de Ferreras, Juan (1751). Histoire generale d'Espagne, traduite de l'espagnol de Jean de Ferreras: Enrichie de notes historiques & critiques, de vignettes en taille-douce, & de cartes géographiques (in French). Vol. 9. Jacques Clousier.
