= English ship Dainty (1588) =

English and later Spanish warship

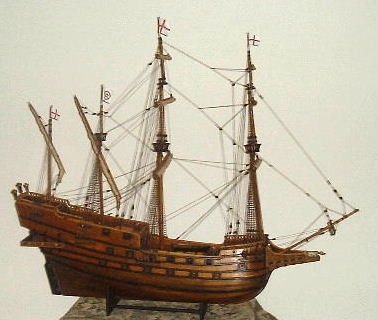
- Scale model of an English galleon

History

England
- Name: Repentance
- Builder: Built in the River Thames
- Laid down: 1588
- Launched: 1588
- Renamed: Dainty (1589)
- Captured: By the Spaniards on 2 July 1594 in the San Mateo Bay action

Spain
- Name: Nuestra Señora de la Visitación (usually also called Visitación)
- Acquired: 2 July 1594
- In service: 1594–1619
- Nickname(s): La Inglesa
- Fate: Sold (fate unknown)

General characteristics
- Class & type: Race-built galleon
- Tons burthen: 300–400 or 500 tons
- Propulsion: Sails
- Complement: 115 (ideal crew)
- Armament: English service: 20–32 guns (1593–1594); Spanish service: 18 guns (1600); 12 guns (1615)

Dainty was an English race-built galleon that began to be built in 1588. The original name was Repentance, but this was soon changed. It participated in some naval engagements in the Anglo-Spanish War (1585–1604). In 1593 it sailed from England under Richard Hawkins to navigate the Pacific Ocean and circumnavigate the world, but was captured the following year by the Spaniards when it was sailing off the coast of what is now Ecuador. It was commissioned by the Spaniards as Nuestra Señora de la Visitación (or Visitación), serving in the South Pacific for several years. She was also known informally by her nickname, La Inglesa.

== Construction ==
In 1588, the privateer Richard Hawkins, son of John Hawkins and cousin of Francis Drake, began building a ship on the River Thames, to become independent of his father and sail towards the Pacific Ocean, (Note: According to Hawkins, the ship had been built to travel to Japan, the Philippines and Moluccas through the Strait of Magellan and make a "perfect discovery" of those parts and establish "the commodities which the countries yielded, and of which they have want". Childs says it is as disingenuous a description of piracy as wielded by any pen.) emulating Drake and Thomas Cavendish. It has been described as a larger ship compared to the Golden Hind, but had the same essential attributes; being "profitable for stowage, good of sail, and well conditioned." The Dainty is considered a sister ship of Revenge.

On the day of its launch, the ship was named Repentance by Hawkins's puritanical stepmother. It was renamed Dainty in 1589 by order of Queen Elizabeth I of England, since when she saw the ship, she considered it beautiful.

== Career ==
=== English service ===
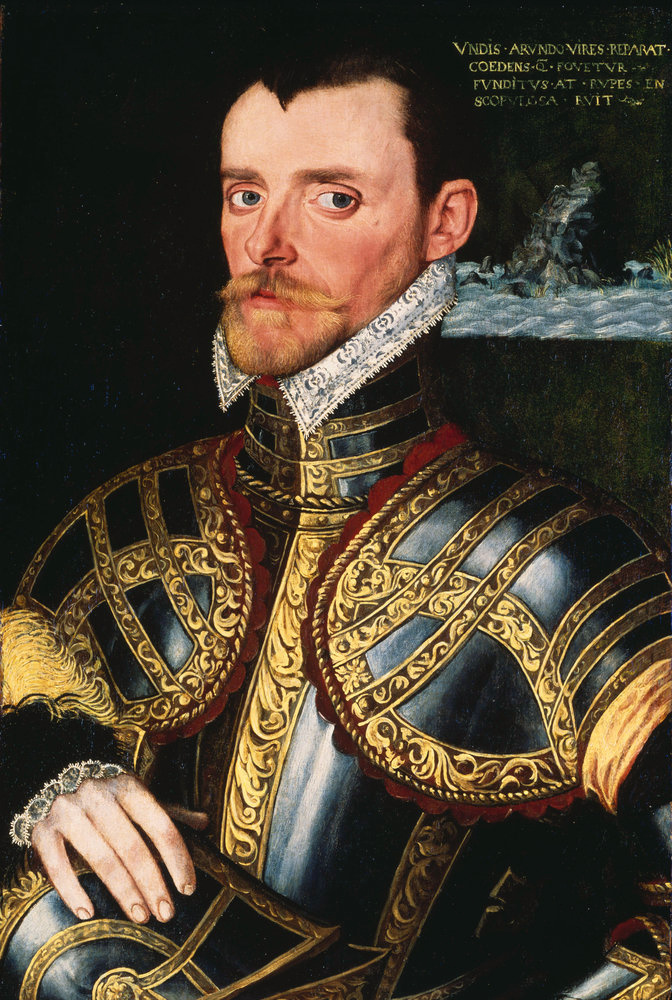
Portrait of Richard Hawkins by an unknown artist in the National Maritime Museum, Greenwich

Hawkins could not make the trip he dreamed of when the ship was ready, as he was forced to sell it to his father. It remained in the service of the Queen's Navy since 1589, during the Anglo-Spanish War. In that year, his father added Dainty in the fleet under Martin Frobisher. In 1592, he participated in the Cruising Voyage to the Azores Islands, collaborating in the capture of the Portuguese carrack Madre de Deus with a rich cargo, and a 600-ton Biscayan ship loaded with iron. On that occasion the ship's captain was not Hawkins; it was helmed by another captain, namely Thomas Thompson of Harwich.

In the brief career of the ship it had already demonstrated good attributes, but Hawkins' father considered that it "never brought but cost, trouble and care", so, as a businessman, he decided to sell it to his son. The young Hawkins resumed his old project for which he had built the Dainty, preparing it in a short time; with a 100 men and 20 or 32 guns.

On 12 June 1593, after Hawkins obtained a letter of queen's mark, he sailed from Plymouth to South America with the flagship Dainty and two other ships that formed his squadron; the 100-ton storeship Hawk and the 60-ton pinnace Fancy. Historians say that the crew of the Dainty and the other ships were of very poor quality, which would explain the delay they had in passing the English Channel and the three months in the Canary Islands.

Before passing the Equator, the ship was almost wrecked in the Gulf of Guinea due to Hawkins errors in calculation, and as time passed, the crew began to be affected by diseases such as scurvy. On November 10, Hawkins approached Santos (Brazil) with his squadron for provision, and five days later he anchored off Santa Ana Island to establish a camp. He was harassed by Native Portuguese militiamen, while stalking ships on the coast.

Due to the number of deaths from disease, the Hawk was sunk by Hawkins and its crew redistributed between the Dainty and Fancy. In December, he abandoned his anchorage off Brazil and, while cruising, captured a 100-ton Portuguese ship with the newly appointed governor and 50 Angolan soldiers. The ship was deprived of all his provisions before being released in January 1594. In the same month, while sailing near the Río de la Plata, the Dainty lost contact with the Fancy, which after separating reversed its course to England. Hawkins arrived with the Dainty in the Falkland Islands, and believing that he had discovered the islands, he baptized them again.

On February 20, Hawkins arrived with his ship at the Strait of Magellan, emerging in the Pacific in early April, heading to the coast of Chile. In the same month, after overcoming a storm, he passed through Valdivia and Mocha Island. Later, the Dainty appeared in Valparaíso, where he captured several ships for which Hawkins got a ransom in money, and continued his journey to the north coast.

On 31 May, sailing along the Peruvian coast, between Chincha Alta and San Vicente de Cañete, he met a Spanish squadron of six ships of varied tonnage under Beltrán de Castro, who had already been alerted to Hawkins's presence. The Dainty managed to escape due to the strong winds that damaged Spanish vessels. Hawkins continued with the ship to the north and, at the end of June, near the bay of Atacames (Ecuador), sighted the Spaniards with two ships under Castro. The Dainty was captured by the Spaniards in a fight that took place on 2 July, becoming the first vessel captured by the Spaniards in the South Pacific.

=== Spanish service ===
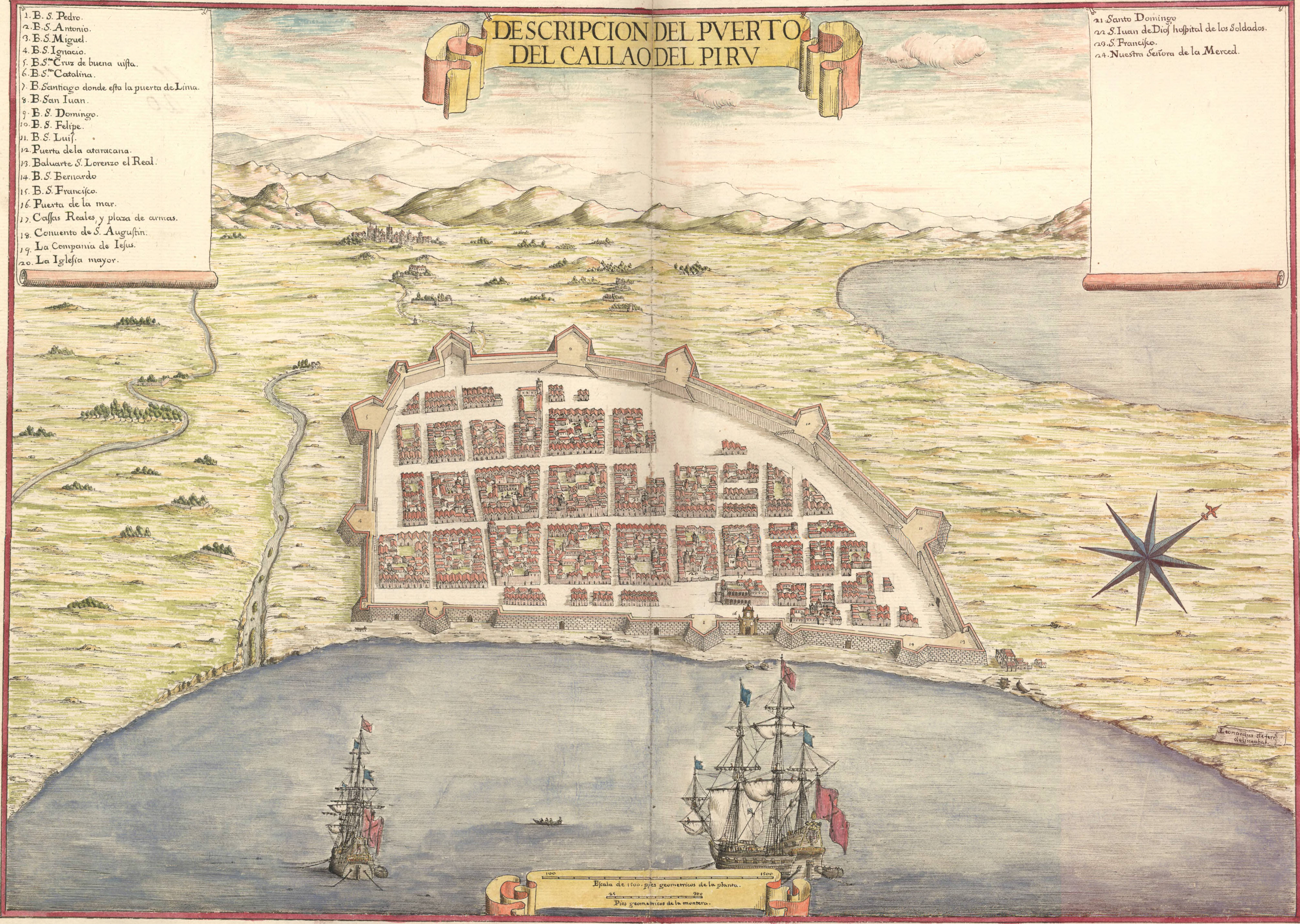
Map of the port of Callao during the 17th century, extracted from the Atlas del Marqués de Heliche

The Spaniards sailed the Dainty to the Pearl Islands and then to the port of Perico (west-northwest of Panama City), having a jubilant reception on 9 July. The guns and ammunition of the prize were priced at 78,000 pesos. The ship was paraded through the harbour like a war trophy, receiving the townspeople on board. For two months the ship was repaired there, and was then taken to Callao, in the Viceroyalty of Peru. It entered the service of the Spanish Navy with the name of Nuestra Señora de la Visitación (also called Visitación), in consideration of the religious holiday of the day it was captured. In addition to the new name, it was nicknamed La Inglesa. The ship remained in service in the Armada del Mar del Sur (English: South Sea Navy) (Note: The Armada del Mar del Sur was a naval institution created in 1580, based in the port of Callao, which had the mission of protecting the trade route of the Spaniards in the American Pacific.) until twenty-five years after its capture by the Spaniards.

During Viceroy Luis de Velasco's rule (1596–1604), it remained permanently enlisted since Dutch intruders entered the South Pacific between 1599 and 1600. (Note: These were the Dutch squadrons of Simon de Cordes and Olivier van Noort.) In January 1600, he was sent with other ships to find the Dutch. By then, the ship was carried by a crew of 145 and was armed with 18 guns. In this period, the Visitación would have been the second capital ship of the Pacific squadron. (Note: Lohmann Villena indicates that in the period of Viceroy Velasco the Visitación was the viceflagship, the second after the flagship. For his part, Bradley presents a table showing the ships that formed the Spanish squadron in January 1600, the viceflagship is not the Visitación but the 28 gun galleon San Andrés.) Between 1602 and 1604, the Visitación underwent an important reconstruction in the shipyard of Guayaquil, which has led some historians to consider it as a completely new vessel.

By 1615, Visitación was in poor condition, as it already had several years of service. In the middle of that year, it stayed in Callao to protect the port, with 30 men and 12 guns, from the threat of the Dutch squadron under Joris van Spilbergen. (Note: Lohmann Villena points out that the Visitación participated in the Battle of Cañete against the Spilbergen fleet between 17 and 18 July 1615, as vice-flagship of the Spanish fleet in the area, ending up sunk in the engagement. Although in reality this ship is confused with the galleon Santa Ana, the true second flagship of the fleet and which was sunk during the battle, as Bradley and Fernández Duro point out.) Shortly after, it set sail for Panama in a convoy, carrying money from the Royal Treasury and private sector, and to bring the new Viceroy of Peru, the Prince of Esquilache. In the government of Esquilache, the veteran Visitación was still in service despite its shortcomings when sailing close-hauled. Later, with the realization of the naval plans of Esquilache between 1617 and 1619, it was sold to finance the purchase of other warships.

== See also ==
- List of early warships of the English navy
- List of galleons of Spain
