= Battle of Flores =

Battle of Flores may refer to:

- Battle of Flores (1591)
- Battle of Flores (1592)
