= English ship Revenge (1577) =

English galleon

Coordinates: 38°46′9″N 27°22′42″W

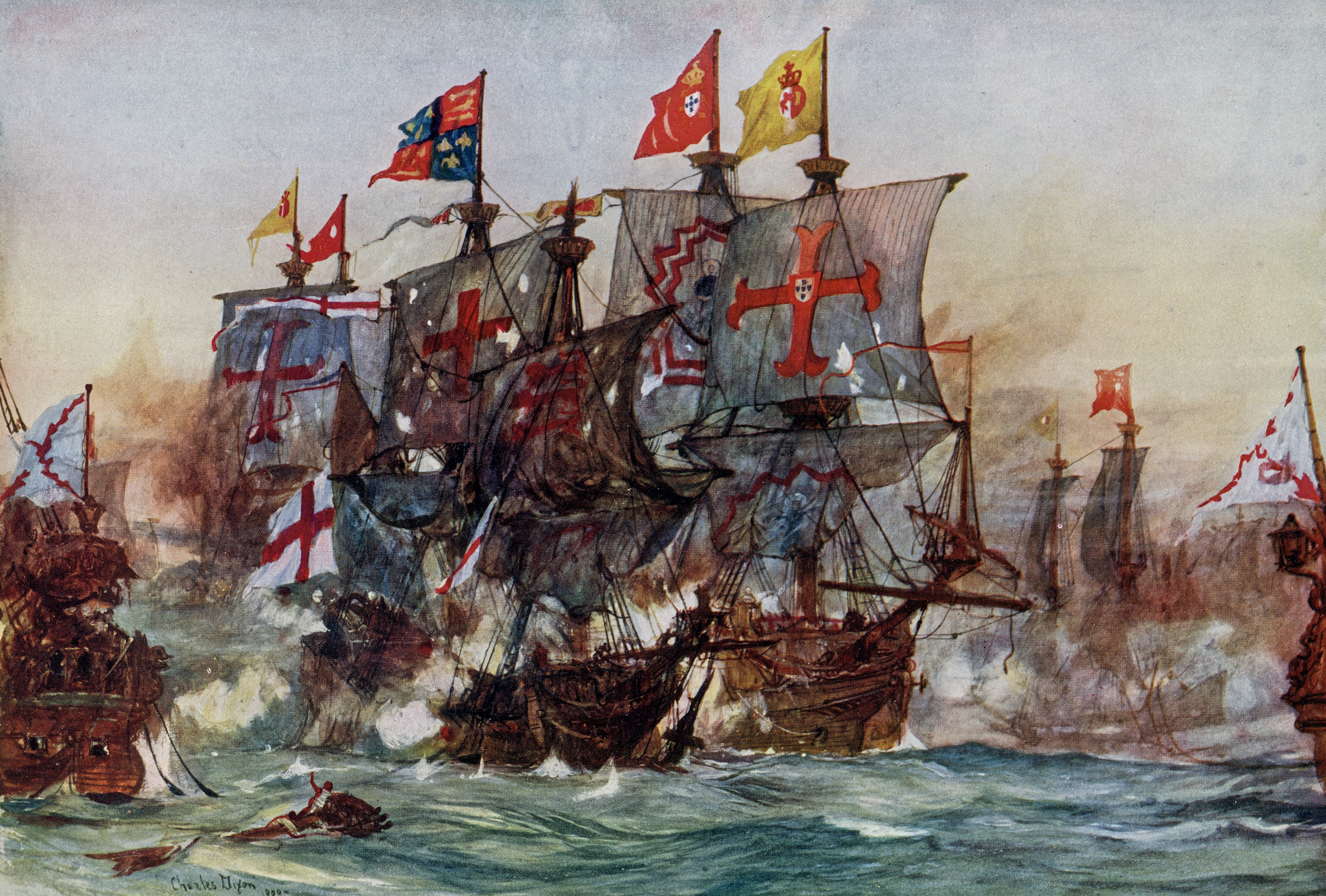
- Revenge (centre) at the Battle of Flores

History

England
- Name: Revenge
- Builder: Mathew Baker at Deptford Royal Dockyard
- Cost: £4,000 (£1.37 million today)
- Launched: 1577
- Fate: Captured 1 September 1591; Ran aground in the Azores soon afterward

General characteristics
- Class & type: Race-built galleon
- Tons burthen: 440
- Length: 140 ft (43 m)
- Sail plan: Early full-rigged ship
- Complement: Approx. 260
- Armament: Forty-six guns: 20 heavy guns on the gundeck; 26 other pieces

Revenge was an English race-built galleon of 46 guns, built in 1577 and captured by the Spanish in 1591, sinking soon afterwards. She was the first of 13 English and Royal Navy ships to bear the name. (Note: Since she was built and served prior to the English Restoration of 1660, she did not carry the 'HMS' prefix.)

== Construction ==
Revenge was built at a cost of £4,000 at the Royal Dockyard, Deptford in 1577 by master shipwright Mathew Baker, under direction of Sir John Hawkins, in his role as Treasurer of the Navy. His race-built design was inspired by a new design in Portugal, the caravel, and was to usher in a new style of ship building that would revolutionise naval warfare for the next three hundred years. A comparatively small vessel, weighing 471 tons, being about half the size of Henry Grace à Dieu, Revenge was rated as a galleon.

== Armament ==
The armament of ships of this period was fluid; guns might be added, removed or changed for different types. Revenge was particularly heavily armed: she carried 2 heavy demi-cannon, 3 cannon priers, 10 culverins and 6 demi-culverins on her gun deck, where the sailors slept. On her upper decks were more demi-culverins, sakers and a variety of light weapons, including swivel-mounted breech-loaders, called "fowlers" or "falconets".

The cannon were made of cast bronze, a dearer but safer option than cast iron. Her crew comprised 150 seamen, 1 gunner and 1 soldier.

== Career ==
=== Irish Rebellion (1579/80) ===
The Revenge at the Siege of Smerwick

On 9 August 1579 news reached London of the arrival of James Fitzgerald, aka Fitzmaurice, at Dingle Bay, having recently executed an audacious raid with three private ships upon the harbour at Bristol, which much shocked the country. Revenge was one of five ships sent by the Royal Navy to deal with this issue. This was under command of Sir John Perrot in place of Sir William Winter who was engaged in a private escort of Prince Francis of Anjou-Alencon for the Queen. The ships were dispatched on 29 August and stayed from mid-September to mid-October, landing a force of troops to quell the rebellion in the Munster area. Revenge left and was involved in the capture of a pirate ship under captaincy of Deryfold of the Flemish coast and was briefly grounded on the Kentish Knocks before harbouring at Harwich. However, the rebellion in Ireland continued, and Revenge was again sent, this time with three other ships, this time going to the River Shannon to support Sir William Pelham in his attack on Carragfoyle. Winter then sailed Revenge back to Dingle Bay where he destroyed Fitzmaurice's ships and effectively fought an end to the rebellion.

In September 1580 Revenge, again under command of Winter, was dispatched to lead eight other ships including the Foresight captained by Martin Frobisher (and also Swiftsure and Aid) to the Smerwick Bay on the westernmost tip of Eire, where a Spanish squadron under Admiral Don Juan Martinez de Recalde was a fort, known as Dun an Air. The Spanish, who had occupied the fort, were forced to surrender on 10 November.

=== Iberian Patrol ===
In 1586 Revenge was under the command of Captain John Hawkins, leading a total of nineteen ships, five owned by the Queen and the remainder commandeered by the Crown. They were ordered to patrol the Portuguese coast looking for French ships returning from South America with cargo of silver and captured four ships between August and October.

=== Raid on Cadiz (1587) ===
In April 1587, Sir Francis Drake headed a fleet of 23 ships, including the 'Revenge', to the Spanish coast and at Cadiz harbour destroyed several ships which Philip II had accumulated in preparation for the Armada. This included the burning of a new completed galleon, which would have been a major threat to the English. In consequence, having lost around 32 ships, Spanish plans for the invasion of England were put off until the following year.

From Cadiz the fleet sailed to Lagos on the Algarve coast of Portugal where a land assault proved fruitless. The fleet then continued south to Sagres where hey besieged a castle and brought about its surrender.

=== Battle of Gravelines (1588) ===
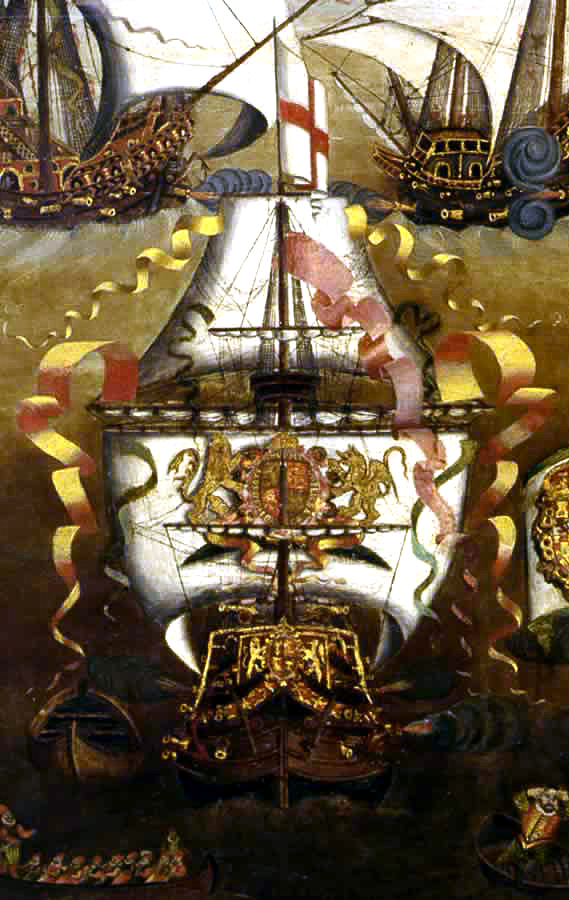
Revenge at Battle of Gravelines

In early 1588, Drake moved his flag from Elizabeth Bonaventure to Revenge, which was considered to be the best by far of the new ships. On 8 August 1588 the Battle of Gravelines (named after a Flemish town near Calais), was concluded with a decisive victory over the Spanish fleet. Following Revenge at the head of the line, the English fleet engaged their broadsides into the Spanish Armada, following a fire ships attack the night before which broke up the tight Spanish formation. Many Spanish vessels were severely damaged, although only a few sank or ran aground. Both sides fought until supplies of ammunition was running dangerously low, and the shattered Armada was forced to flee into the North Sea. The English fleet shadowed them until they drew level with Edinburgh, and then returned to port, ending the threat of a Spanish invasion.

=== Drake–Norris expedition (1589) ===
In 1589 Revenge again put to sea as Drake's flagship, in what was to be a failed attempt to destroy the surviving Spanish fleet at Santander and invade Spanish-controlled Portugal. Returning with the ship in an unseaworthy condition, and without any prizes to his credit Drake fell out of favour with Queen Elizabeth I and was kept ashore until 1595.

=== Frobisher expedition (1590) ===
In 1590 Revenge was commanded by Sir Martin Frobisher in an unsuccessful expedition along the coast of Spain to intercept the Spanish treasure fleet.

== Capture by the Spanish and sinking (1591) ==
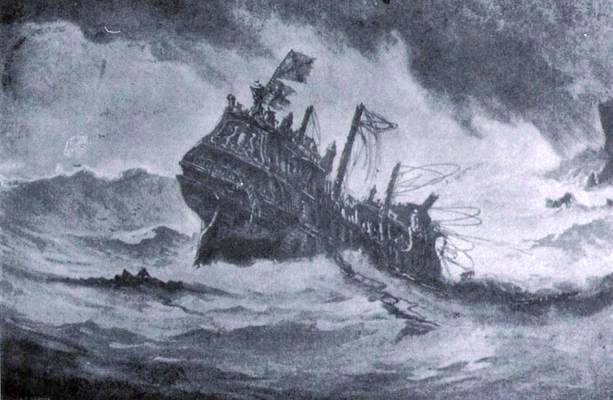
Revenge sinking near Terceira during a storm after surrender to the Spanish off Flores, according to an illustration from 1897

In order to impede a Spanish naval recovery after the Armada, Sir John Hawkins proposed a blockade of the supply of treasure being acquired from the Spanish Empire in America by a constant naval patrol designed to intercept Spanish ships. Revenge was on such a patrol in the summer of 1591 under the command of Sir Richard Grenville.

The Spanish had dispatched a fleet of some 53 ships under Alonso de Bazán, having under his orders generals Martín de Bertendona and Marcos de Aramburu. Intent upon the capture of the English at Flores in the northern Azores. In late August 1591 the Spanish fleet came upon the English while repairs to the ships caused the crews, many of whom were suffering an epidemic of fever, to be ashore. Most of the ships managed to slip away to sea. Grenville who had many sick men ashore decided to wait for them. When putting to sea he might have gone round the west of Corvo island, but he decided to go straight through the Spaniards, who were approaching from the eastward.

The battle began late on 31 August, when overwhelming force was immediately brought to bear upon the ship, which put up a fierce resistance. For some time he succeeded by skillful tactics in avoiding much of the enemy's fire, but they were all round him and gradually numbers began to tell. As one Spanish ship retired beaten, another took her place, and for fifteen hours the unequal contest continued. Attempts by the Spaniards to board were driven off. San Felipe, a vessel three times her size, tried to come alongside for the Spaniards to board her, along with Aramburu's San Cristóbal. After boarding Revenge, San Felipe was forced to break off. Seven men of the boarding party died, and the other three were rescued by San Bernabé, which grappled her shortly after. The Spanish also lost the galleon Ascensión and a smaller vessel by accident that night, after they collided with each other. Meanwhile, San Cristóbal, which had come to help San Felipe, rammed Revenge underneath her aftcastle, and some time later, Bertendona's San Bernabé battered the English warship with heavy fire, inflicting many casualties and severe damage. The English crew returned fire from the embrasures below deck. When morning broke on 1 September, Revenge lay with her masts shot away, six feet of water on the hold and only sixteen men left uninjured out of a crew of two hundred and fifty. She remained grappled by the galleons San Bernabé and San Cristóbal, the latter with her bow shattered by the ramming. The grappling manoeuvre of San Bernabé, which compelled the English gun crews to abandon their posts in order to fight off boarding parties, was decisive in securing the fate of the Revenge.

"Out-gunned, out-fought, and out-numbered fifty-three to one", when the end looked certain Grenville ordered Revenge to be sunk: "Sink me the ship, Master Gunner—sink her, split her in twain! Fall into the hands of God, not into the hands of Spain!" His officers could not agree with this order and a surrender was agreed by which the lives of the officers and crew would be spared. After an assurance of proper conduct, and having held off dozens of Spanish ships, Revenge at last surrendered. The injured Grenville died of wounds two days later aboard the Spanish flagship.

The captured but heavily damaged Revenge never reached Spain, but was lost with her mixed prize-crew of 70 Spaniards and English captives, along with a large number of the Spanish ships in a heavy storm off the Azores. The battle-damaged Revenge was cast upon a cliff next to the island off Terceira, where she broke up completely. Between 1592 and 1593, 14 guns of the Revenge were recovered by the Spanish from the site of the wreck. Other cannons were driven ashore years later by the tide, and the last weapons raised were salvaged as late as 1625.

== Revenge in literature and the arts ==
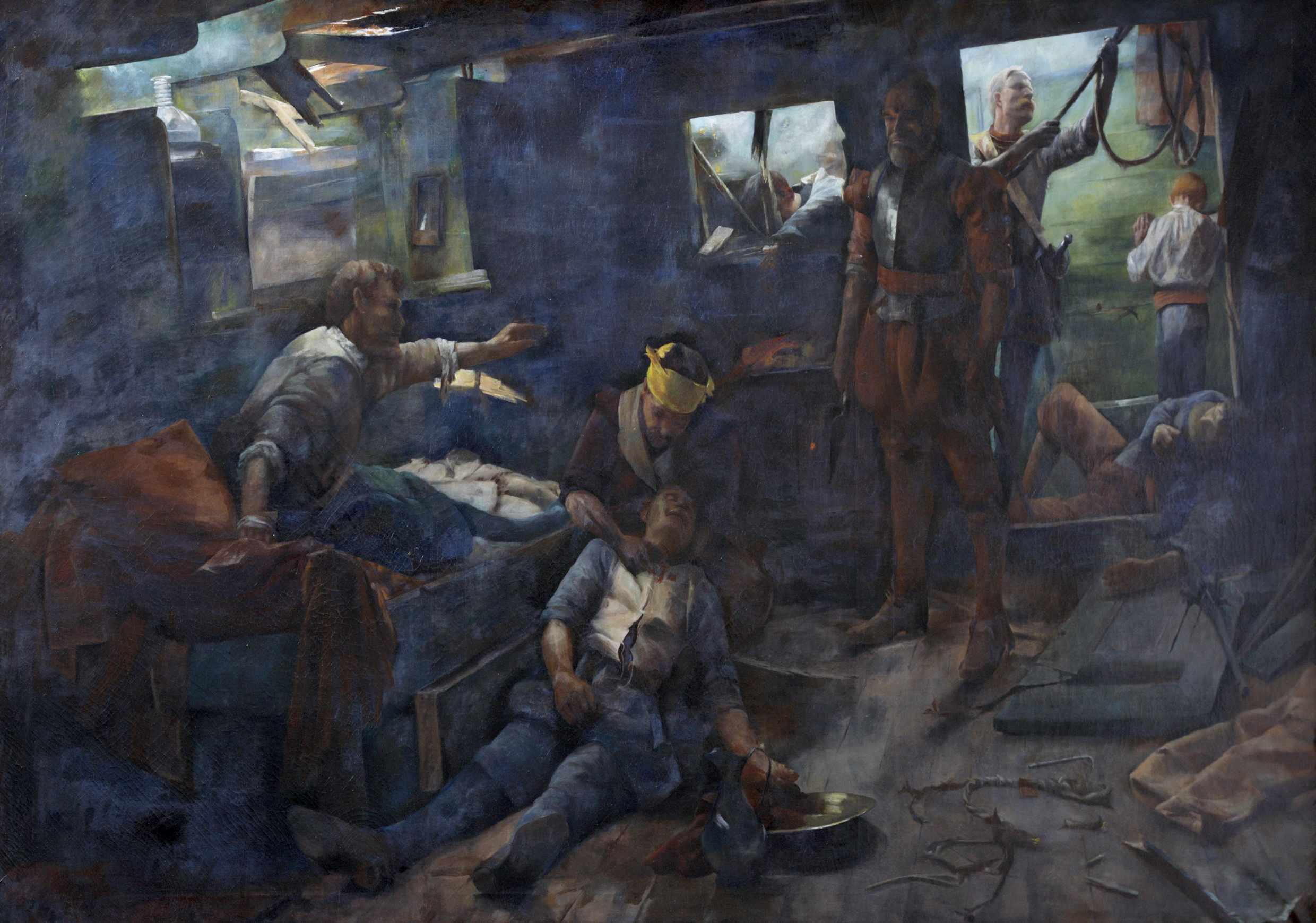
Aboard the Revenge by Frank Wright Bourdillon

Her final action inspired a popular poem entitled The Revenge: A Ballad of the Fleet by Lord Tennyson, which dramatically narrates the course of the engagement. Charles Villiers Stanford composed a choral setting of the poem in 1886, which proved popular at the time.

Al Stewart's song "Lord Grenville" (on his 1976 album Year of the Cat) concerns the end of the Revenge at Flores.

Sir Richard Grenville and the Revenge are the subject matter of the Strawhead song Grenville and the Revenge in their Gentlemen of Fortune album.

== See also ==
- Dainty, considered a sister ship of Revenge
