= Race-built galleon =

Type of galleon

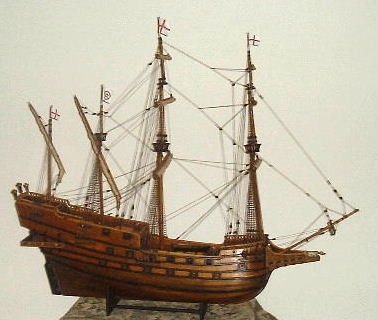
Model of a race-built galleon

The race-built galleon was a type of galleon built in England for the Tudor navy between c. 1570 and c. 1590. They began being built under the direction of the English naval commander Sir John Hawkins and his shipwrights Richard Chapman, Peter Pett and Mathew Baker. The description of these ships as "race-built" derived from their "raced" or razed forecastles and aftercastles, which combined with their greater length in relation to their beam gave them a purposeful, sleek look. Their builders described them as having "the head of a cod and the tail of a mackerel". Race-built galleons were purposely designed and built instead of being pre-existing galleons which were razeed.

In 1570 Hawkins partnering with Chapman to build or rebuild warships for the Navy Board at Deptford Dockyard. The prototype of these new galleons was the 295-ton Foresight, which was built under Chapman's direction and launched in 1570. Her successful sea trials was followed in 1573 by the 360-ton Dreadnought (built under Baker's direction) and 350-ton Swiftsure (built under Pett's direction). In 1577 the 464-ton Revenge was built together with the smaller 132-ton Scout. Following Hawkins's appointment as Treasurer of the Navy in 1578, further vessels along similar lines were built over the following decade, including Dainty in 1588.
