= Action of San Mateo Bay =

Coordinates: 1°1′2.6″N 79°36′30.5″W

- Part of the Anglo–Spanish War (1585)
Date	29 June – 1 July 1594
Location	Esmeraldas River mouth, nowadays Ecuador
Result	Spanish victory

Belligerents
Kingdom of England	Spain

Commanders and leaders
(England) Richard Hawkins (POW)	(Spain) Beltrán de Castro

Strength
1 galleon 1 pinnace prize	1 galleon 1 galley-zabra

Casualties and losses
1 galleon captured 1 pinnace recaptured 27 killed 17 wounded 93 captured	28 dead 22 wounded

The action of San Mateo Bay or action of Atacames Bay was a naval engagement which took place from 29 June to 1 July 1594 between the galleon Dainty under the command of English privateer Richard Hawkins and a Spanish squadron of three galleons commanded by Beltrán de Castro at the mouth of the Esmeraldas river, nowadays Ecuador.

== Background ==
In 1593 Hawkins, a nephew of Sir Francis Drake, purchased the Dainty, a ship originally built for his father as Repentance and used by him in his expeditions, and sailed for the West Indies, the Spanish Main, and the South Seas. It seems clear that his project was to prey on the overseas possessions of the Spanish crown. Hawkins, however, in an account of the voyage written 30 years afterwards, maintained that his expedition was undertaken purely for the purpose of geographical discovery. After visiting the coast of Brazil, the Dainty passed through the Straits of Magellan, and in due course reached Valparaíso, where he plundered the town and captured four vessels.

== Engagement ==
After refreshing provisions for four days in Atacames Bay, Richard Hawkins spotted a vessel in open sea and ordered his pinnace to investigate. At 9:00 A.M the next day he weighed with his ship and took up station farther west off Cape San Francisco for two days before returning and discovering his dismasted consort in nearby San Mateo Bay.

The English duo was preparing to sail out into the Pacific by the morning of 29 June when two other ships came around Cape San Francisco. Believing to be Spanish treasure ships from Peru, Hawkins sent his repaired pinnace to reconnoiter, only to see it chased back by Felipón's 14-gun galley-zabra. De Castro's San Francisco y Nuestra Señora del Rosario followed close astern and attempted to run aboard Dainty but was checked by a heavy broadside. In the meanwhile, the pinnace's crew strove to regain their flagship and concentrate forces but was intercepted by the galley-zabra; a few survivors managed to clamber aboard over the bowsprit. Both sides then exchanged long-range salvos for the next couple of days, the English toppling Felipón's mainmast on 30 June before finally surrendering to the Spaniards by the afternoon of 1 July. On the Dainty, 27 of the crew were killed, 17 (including Hawkins) were wounded, and 93 others captured. The Spanish lost 28 dead and 22 wounded out of 300.

De Castro installed Felipón as prize master and towed the badly damaged English flagship to the Pearl Islands, reaching Perico island for a tumultuous reception on 19 July. Despite being promised honorable terms by De Castro, Peruvian colonial authorities were of a different opinion and most of the English captives were tried by the Inquisition and condemned as galley slaves, while Hawkins was freed and eventually returned to England. Dainty was renamed to Nuestra Señora de la Visitación, also known as La Inglesa, and incorporated into the Peruvian Squadron of the Spanish navy. The Dainty was exhibited at Panama as a trophy of war: the first prize taken by the Spaniards in the Southern Seas.

== See also ==
- John Oxenham - Francis Drake's second-in-command, the first non-Spanish European to cross the Isthmus of Panama in 1578. Sailing the Pacific and the Tuira River in a makeshift draft, he and his men were eventually chased and captured by a Spanish squadron. Executed by Lima's Inquisition in 1580.
