= Battle of Flores (1592) =

Battle of 1592 during the Anglo-Spanish War

- Part of the Anglo–Spanish War
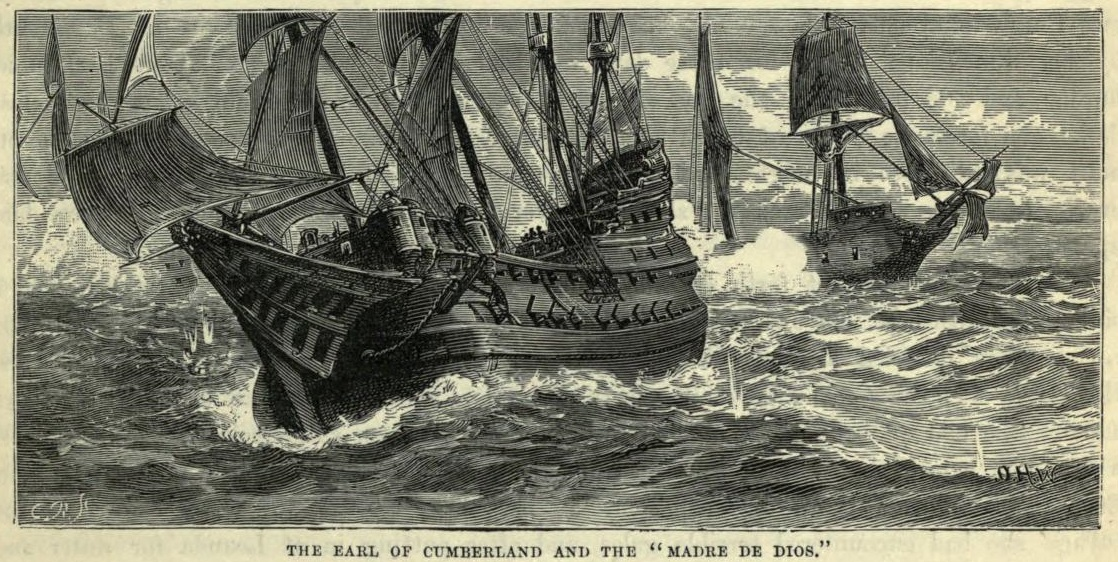
- The battle between the Earl of Cumberland and the Madre de Dios envisaged in a 19th-century English drawing
Date	20 May – 13 August 1592
Location	Atlantic, off Flores Island (Azores) 39°30′43″N 31°10′55″W
Result	English victory

Belligerents
Spain: Portugal under Philip of Spain	England

Commanders and leaders
André de Mendonça; Alonso de Bazán	Walter Raleigh; John Burgh; Earl of Cumberland; Martin Frobisher (acting)

Strength
Various Spanish & Portuguese ships	9 warships 7 support ships

Casualties and losses
1 Carrack captured, 1 Carrack destroyed, 1 Galleon captured 3 other ships captured or burned 1,000 killed, wounded or captured	120 killed or wounded 3 ships sunk in storm Unknown to disease

The Battle of Flores (1592), also known as Cruising Voyage to the Azores of 1592, or the Capture of the Madre de Deus describes a series of naval engagements that took place from 20 May to 19 August 1592, during the Anglo-Spanish War. The battle was part of an expedition by an English fleet initially led by Sir Walter Raleigh, and then by Martin Frobisher and John Burgh. The expedition involved the capture of a number of Portuguese and Spanish ships including the large Portuguese carrack Madre de Deus, after a long naval battle off the island of Flores in the Azores. The expedition, particularly the capture of the great carrack, was a financial and military success. The rich cargo aboard the carrack, which at the time equaled nearly half the size of the Kingdom of England's royal annual revenue, was subject to mass theft when it arrived in Dartmouth, England, followed by quarrels over the shares of the prize. The expedition had formative consequences for the English both financially and on the future of English exploration.

== Background ==
By virtue of the Iberian Union that joined the crowns of Portugal and Spain in 1580, the Anglo-Portuguese Treaty of 1373 had fallen in abeyance. As the Anglo–Spanish War was ongoing, Portuguese shipping was a fair target for the Royal Navy. Sir Walter Raleigh, having only just been released from the Tower of London, received a commission from Queen Elizabeth I for an expedition to the West Indies. He outfitted a sixteen ship naval squadron of which two, the Garland and Foresight belonged to the Queen.

=== Expedition ===
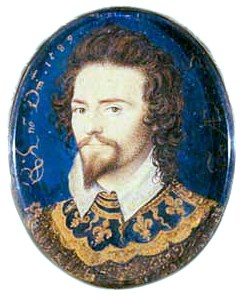
George Clifford, seen here in a miniature by Nicholas Hilliard, helped to assemble and finance the expedition

The expedition was a private venture much like the Drake-Norris expedition, supported by limited assistance and subsidies from the crown. Its objective was to pillage Spanish and Portuguese ships within the Atlantic, off the Spanish coast or within the Caribbean and to make a profit from which the Queen's portion would amount to a large sum.

Raleigh appointed John Burgh as his vice-admiral and was joined in commission with Frobisher, who had knowledge of maritime affairs. George Clifford, the Earl of Cumberland, had the largest stake in the expedition and helped Raleigh to finance and gather the fleet. The majority of the fleet was owned by investors; the ship Dainty for example was owned by John Hawkins, but was captained by another, which varies according to sources, Thomas Thompson or John Norton. The fleet included notables such as William Monson, Robert Crosse, captain of the Foresight, Samuel Purchas, Richard Hawkins, and Christopher Newport, captain of the Golden Dragon.

The expedition launched from Dartmouth, setting sail on 6 May 1592 after delays due to bad weather. The planned voyage to the West Indies was put on hold as supplies had already been depleted during the delay. Instead the fleet intended to head towards the Azores to intercept a Spanish treasure fleet or Portuguese carracks heading homeward from the East Indies. Initially Raleigh commanded, but on the following day, 7 May, the fleet was overtaken by Frobisher in the pinnace Disdain. Raleigh was given letters from the Queen ordering his immediate recall to England, and thus Frobisher took command. On 11 May a storm struck just off Cape Finisterre, scattering the majority of the fleet; three small ships were sunk and Garland very nearly foundered.

Nearing Cape St Vincent on the Portuguese coast, the fleet split into two sections as ordered by Raleigh. One, under Burgh, headed to the Azores to lie in wait for Spanish and Portuguese ships. The other, under Frobisher in Garland with Clifford, cruised off Cape St. Vincent with the strategy to pin the Spanish fleet against their own lee coast.

=== First engagements ===
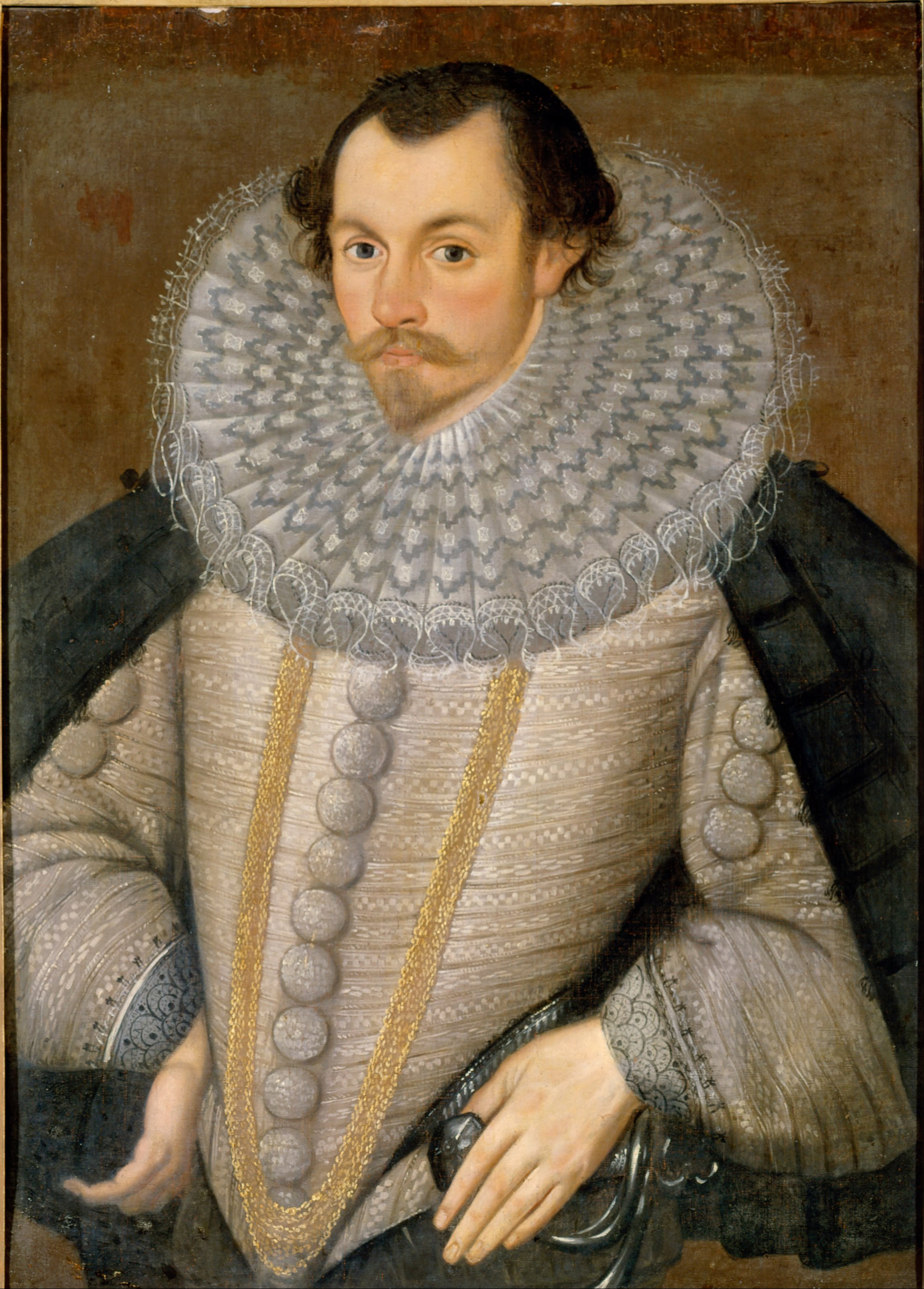
Sir Martin Frobisher, assumed to be the subject of this portrait, took command of the fleet when Sir Walter Raleigh was recalled.

The fleet sailed further south, and by the end of May encountered the Santa Clara, an armed, 600-ton Spanish galleon, just off Cape St. Vincent. The English captured the ship after heavy resistance, taking whatever goods the Spanish had failed to retrieve from her burnt-out hull. She was carrying a large amount of ironware valued at £7,000 and was sailing to Sanlúcar de Barrameda where further freight was destined for the West Indies. With the capture, the fleet separated, leaving the prize and goods in the hands of Frobisher and Clifford.

As the fleet continued south from the Cape in early June, Burgh in the Roebuck took a Spanish flyboat after a long chase that brought him near the Spanish coast. The flyboat's master revealed that a great fleet was prepared at Cádiz and Sanlúcar de Barrameda. Having received intelligence that Raleigh was fitted out with a strong force for the West Indies, Philip II of Spain had provided a large fleet to oppose Raleigh and to escort the rich East India carracks to port. Don Alonso de Bazán, brother to the Marquis of Santa Cruz and Captain General of the Armada, was to pursue and intercept Raleigh's fleet. As Burgh's men were burning the flyboat, part of the Spanish fleet was spotted, and Burgh, having rejoined his own fleet, soon sailed to the Azores.

Further north off Portugal, Frobisher's position became untenable, although he captured a prize fresh from Brazil laden with sugar heading to Lisbon on 18 June and a few days later captured a Spanish caravel. Frobisher's group returned to England from Cape St. Vincent having missed Alvaro de Bazán's fleet further south.

== Battle ==
Burgh did not have to wait long: on 25 June his scout ships spotted a large vessel approaching them near Corvo Island, the northernmost of the Azores.

=== Santa Cruz ===
The vessel, the 800-ton Portuguese carrack Santa Cruz, was pursued by three of Cumberland's ships. A storm arrived and forced the English away from the lee shore, but Santa Cruz was beached on the coast of Corvo. The following morning, once the storm had passed, the Portuguese who had disembarked set up entrenchments nearby, taking off the cargo and burning the vessel. Burgh immediately dispatched 100 soldiers who waded ashore and easily dispersed those who guarded the shore; after some resistance the site was captured, and the Portuguese fled. The cargo burnt inside the ship although some was salvaged by the English. Prisoners were taken, including the ship's purser and two foreign gunners. Under threat of torture they confessed that within fifteen days, three other carracks would arrive at the island. The fleet of five carracks had departed from Goa and were headed for Lisbon and consisted of the Santa Cruz, Buen Jesus admiral, Madre de Deus, San Bernardo, and San Christophoro. Madre de Deus was the largest of the fleet, a thirty-two gun vessel of 1,600 tons and was one of the Portuguese crown's greatest and one of the largest sailing ships ever built.

With the news, the English ships waited and raided the villages on Corvo for supplies. For the month of July the English ships formed a picket line spaced about six miles apart along a north/south axis. From the southern flank near Flores Island, the order of ships was Dainty, Golden Dragon, Roebuck, Tiger, Sampson, Prudence, and Foresight. The Spanish fleet, which had been sighted briefly, seemed no longer a threat; Alvaro de Bazan had made a major miscalculation: he disobeyed orders and headed further west, allowing the English to first reach the area of interception.

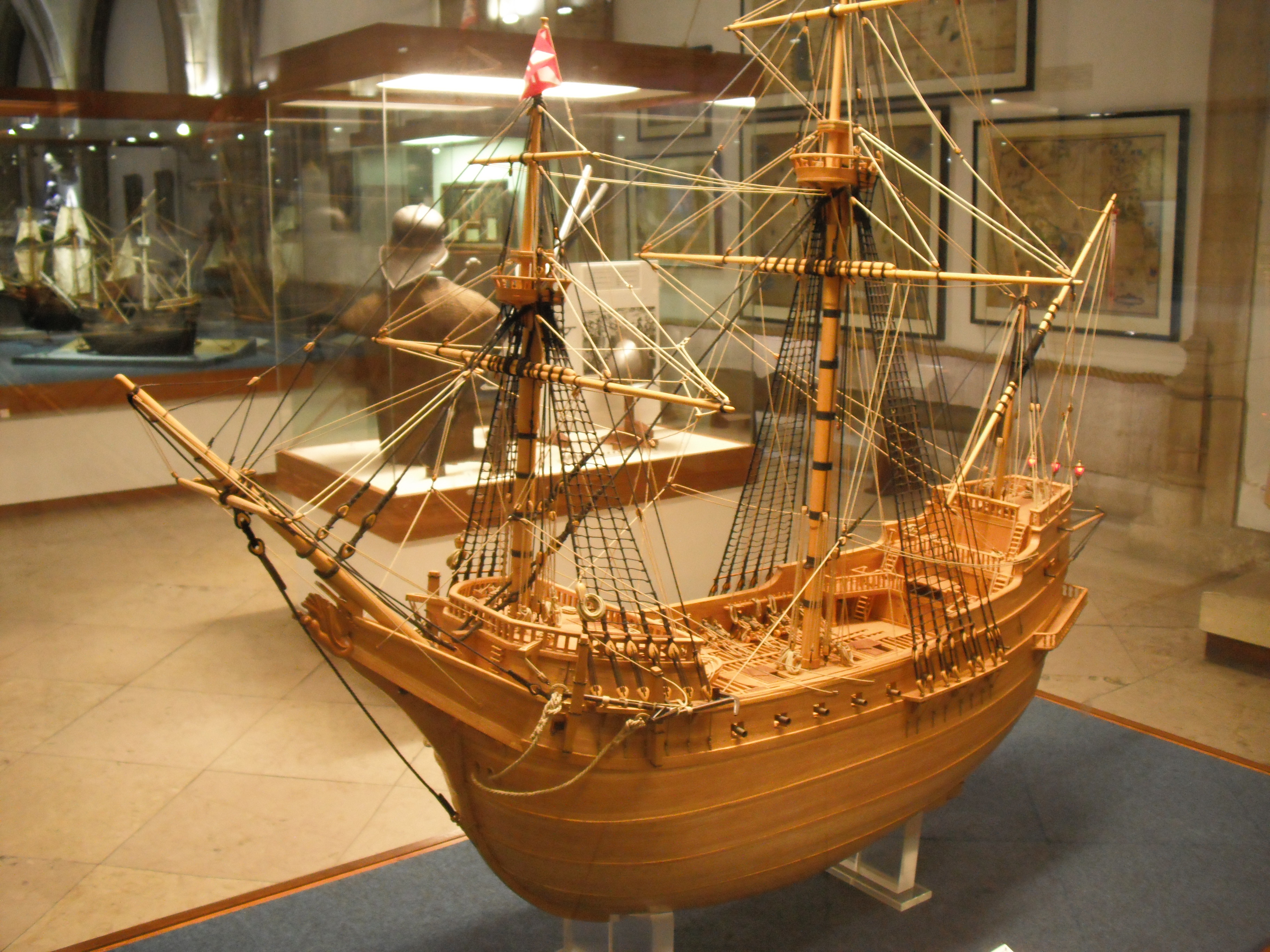
Model of the Portuguese carrack Madre de Deus, in the Maritime Museum (Lisbon)

=== Madre de Deus ===
On 3 August Dainty sighted a large ship heading directly towards them and as it drew nearer, its enormous size became apparent. The carrack was far larger than Santa Cruz, fully three times the size of England's biggest ship. Madre de Deus was attacked by the much smaller Dainty. Around midday Newport's Golden Dragon, followed by Roebuck - bigger than Dainty, but only a fraction of the Madre, joined the fray. These were followed at two-hour intervals by Foresight and Prudence in the evening. The Dainty had her foremast shot away and was out of the battle for five hours.

The English hoped to avoid sinking their opponent and to prevent her from running aground. The damage on Madre de Deus's defences was becoming serious. With her bow rigging all but disabled, Burgh sent Roebuck which then crashed into Madre de Deus, followed by Foresight. Both moved directly under her main guns. The English boarded her in the dark at 10 pm. Golden Dragon, Sampson, and Tiger and the repaired Dainty came up in support. The English took the ship after a bloody hand-to-hand combat.

The bloody decks of Madre De Deus were strewn with bodies, especially around the helm. The carrack was nearly destroyed when a cabin full of cartridges caught fire, and only quick English action saved the prize. Burgh spared Captain Fernão de Mendonça and the rest of the wounded, sending them ashore. Burgh was trying to keep his own Roebuck afloat, as it had sustained damage when it crashed into Madre. Only when Burgh came aboard and claimed the prize in the name of the Queen did pillaging stop. Sailors were stripped of "stolen" goods; however, this proved only temporary.

The carrack was quickly repaired, heavily guarded by all ships, and the expedition set sail for England. Bazán now closed in on the English but he was too late; for a hundred leagues he pursued the English in vain before returning to Spain. The fleet reached the English Channel in early September without incident.

== Aftermath ==
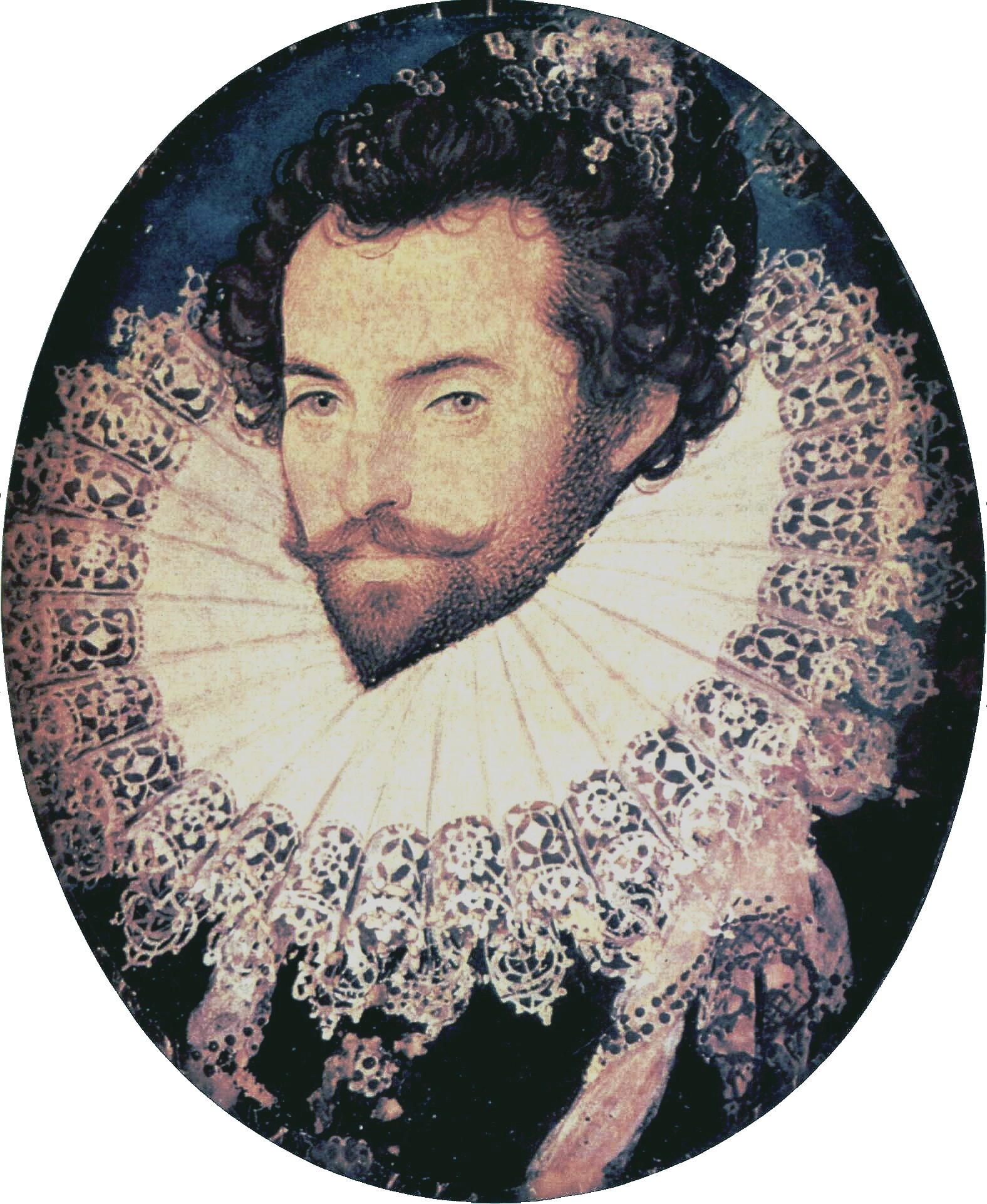
Sir Walter Raleigh, by Nicholas Hilliard

As the fleet sailed back to England, Burgh produced an inventory - the report mentions:

"Gods great favor towards our nation, who by putting this purchase into our hands hath manifestly discovered those secret trades & Indian riches, which hitherto lay strangely hidden, and cunningly concealed from us".

Among these riches were chests filled with jewels and pearls, gold and silver coins, ambergris, bolts of the highest-quality cloth, fine tapestries, 425 tons of pepper, 45 tons of cloves, 35 tons of cinnamon, 3 tons of mace and 3 of nutmeg, 2.5 tons of benjamin (a highly aromatic balsamic resin used for perfumes and medicines), 25 tons of the precious red dye cochineal and 15 tons of ebony. An inventory was taken:

"spices, drugs, silks, calicos, quilts, carpets and colors, &c. The spices were pepper, cloves, maces, nutmegs, cinnamon and greene ginger: the drugs were benjamin, frankincense, Galangal, mirabilis, aloes zocotrina, camphire: the silks, damasks, taffatas, alto bassos, that is, counterfeit, cloth of gold, unwrought China silk, sleeved silk, white twisted silk, curled cypresse. The calicos were book-calicos, calico-launes, broad white calicos, fine starched calicoes, course white calicos, brown broad calicos, brown course calicos. There were also canopies, and course diapertowels, quilts of course sarcenet and of calico, carpets like those of Turky; whereunto are to be added the pearl, muske, civet, and amber-griece. The rest of the wares were many in number, but less in value; as elephants teeth, porcelain vessels of China, coco-nuts, hides, ebenwood as black as jet, bested of the same, cloth of the rind's of trees very strange for the matter, and artificial in workmanship".

There was also a rutter and a document, printed at Macau in 1590, containing valuable information on the China and Japan trade. Hakluyt observed that it was "enclosed in a case of sweet Cedar wood, and lapped up almost an hundredfold in fine Calicut-cloth, as though it had been some incomparable jewel".

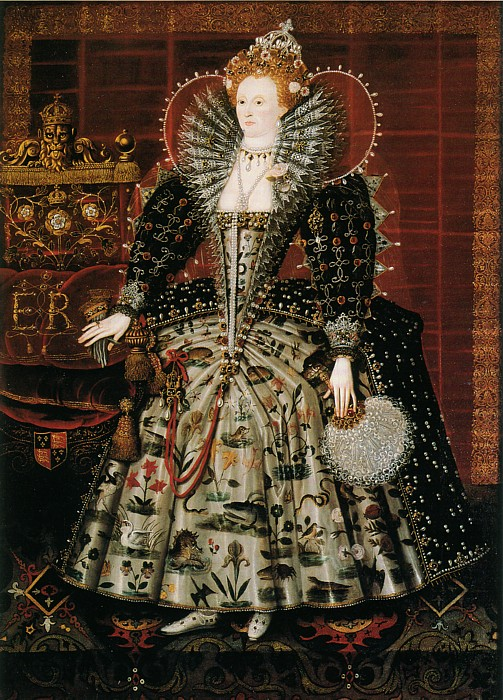
Queen Elizabeth I made a 2000% profit from the expedition

Madre de Deus entered Dartmouth harbor on 7 September, towering over the other ships and the town's small houses as it sailed by. The only vessel guarding the great ship was Roebuck, as the other vessels had slipped off to Portsmouth to sell off some of the plunder. Nothing like Madre had ever been seen in England - the frame from the beakhead to the stern was 165 feet (50 m) long. The breadth at the broadest deck, was just over 46 feet (14 m) and her draft was 26 feet (7.9 m) at her arrival in Dartmouth. Her several decks; consisted of a main orlop, three main decks, and a forecastle and a spar deck of two floors each. The length of the keel was 100 feet (30 m), the main-mast was 121 feet (37 m), and its circumference at the partners was just over 10 feet (3.0 m). The main-yard was 106 feet (32 m) long.

=== Mass theft ===
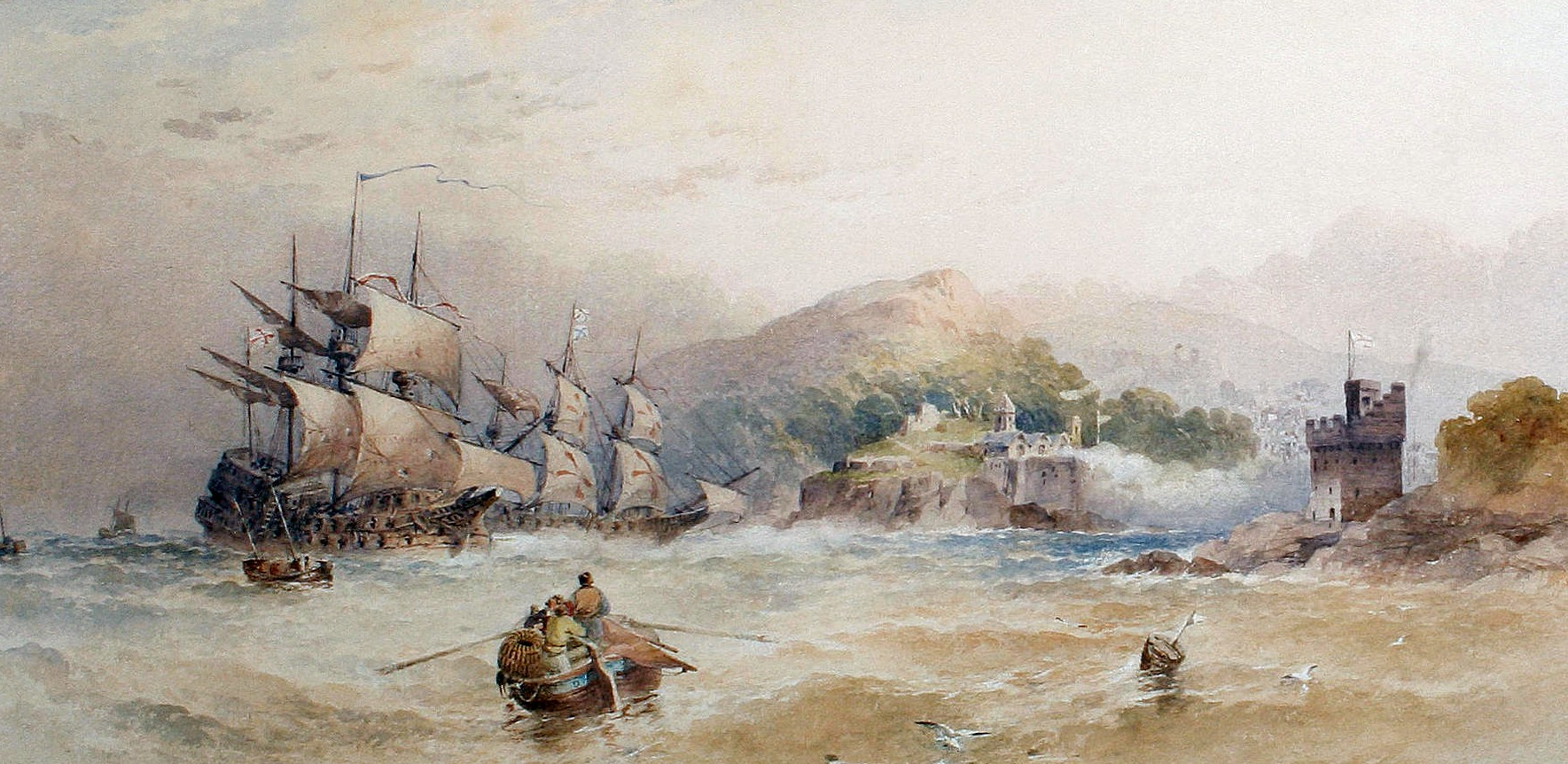
The arrival of the Great Carrack 'Madre de Dios' at Dartmouth Harbour, 18th Sept 1592, 19th century illustration.

Madre de Deus attracted all manner of traders, dealers, cutpurses, and thieves from miles around, from as far as London and beyond. At seeing this huge vessel, pandemonium broke out amongst the townspeople; they visited the floating castle and sought out drunken sailors in taverns and pubs, buying, stealing, pinching, and fighting for the takings. Local fishermen as well ventured aboard, further depleting the cargo.

English law at the time provided that a large share of the loot was owed to the sovereign. When Queen Elizabeth discovered the extent of the theft, she sent Raleigh to reclaim her money and punish the looters. He swore, "If I meet any of them coming up, if it be upon the wildest heath in all the way, I mean to strip them as naked as they were ever born, for Her Majesty has been robbed and that of the most rare things." By the time Raleigh had restored order, a cargo estimated at half a million pounds nearly, almost half the wealth of the English treasury at the time and perhaps the second-largest treasure ever after the Ransom of Atahualpa, had been reduced to £140,000. Still, ten freighters were needed to carry the treasure around the coast and up the River Thames to London. In all the expedition as a whole yielded Elizabeth a 20-fold return on her investment.

Both Burgh and Clifford however were disappointed in what they were given and they and other investors contested their share. Clifford received nothing, although as special compensation, the queen allotted him a sum in consideration of his money venture. For Burgh there was no compensation, and bitter quarrels continued, leading to a fatal duel two years later.

== Consequences ==
Alonso de Bazán, despite having a greater fleet, failed to intercept any English ship, lost two large carracks and was disgraced by the King of Spain for his negligence. By contrast the English learned that the fleet should not divide itself as had been done before capturing Madre de Deus, making a more effective force. When later ships were brought into the Thames for unloading, the dockers were made to dress in "suits of canvas doublet without pockets" to reduce opportunities for theft.

The taste of the riches of the East galvanized English interest in the region. Madre de Deus's rutter from Macau was a forerunner to voyages that would end up establishing the East India Company in 1600. By 1603 the newly formed company itself would end up with a trading factory at Bantam.

== See also ==
- Battle of Flores (1591)
- Portuguese India Armadas
- Santa Catarina
- Battle of Sesimbra Bay
