= John Burgh (officer) =

English soldier

Sir John Burgh
- Born: 1561/2
- Died: 1594 (aged about 32)
- Burial place: St. Andrew's Chapel, Westminster Abbey
- Military career
- Allegiance: Kingdom of England
- Service: English Army Royal Navy
- Rank: Captain
- Conflicts: French Wars of Religion; Anglo-Spanish War; Battle of Flores

Sir John Burgh (c. 1562–1594) was an English military and naval commander and privateer. He took troops from Lincolnshire to serve in the Netherlands in 1585; was subsequently knighted; made governor of Doesburg; and governor of the Briel in early 1588; commanded one of the English regiments which helped Henry IV of France in 1589–90, and was knighted on the field at Ivry in 1590; finally commanded the squadron which captured the great Spanish treasure-ship off the Azores in 1592, and was killed in a duel respecting the plunder.

== Life ==
John Burgh, a lineal descendant of Hubert de Burgh, was a younger son of William, 4th Lord Burgh of Gainsborough, and brother of Thomas, 5th Lord Burgh, Lord-Deputy in Ireland. The first mention of him that has been reserved is in 1585, when he raised a body of men in Lincolnshire for service beyond the sea, embarked with them at Hull on 25 August, and commanded them in the campaigns in the Netherlands, under the Earl of Leicester, and afterwards under Lord Willoughby. He was knighted by Leicester and appointed governor of Doesburg; in the early months of 1588 he was for some little time governor of the Briel, possibly as his brother's deputy, at which time he wrote to Lord Willoughby, imploring his favourable consideration, as he had had no pay for nineteen months, and was in extreme need. In September 1589 he commanded one of the regiments which went to France with Lord Willoughby to the support the French King Henry IV. During this trip a quarrel he had with Sir William Drury led to a duel which resulted in Drury's death from the wounds. Burgh wrote to Walsingham concerned that this turn of events might incur the Queen's disfavour. Although already knighted, he received the honour of knighthood on the field of Ivry from Henry IV in recognition of his distinguished conduct in the battle.

On his return to England he became associated with Sir Walter Raleigh, and was in 1592 appointed by him to command his ship the Roebuck, one of a squadron fitted out by the Queen, Raleigh, the Earl of Cumberland, and others, to intercept the Spanish treasure ships. The little squadron put to sea under the command of Burgh, another squadron being detached under Sir Martin Frobisher. On 3 August Burgh (near the Azores) fell in with the Madre de Dios, or, as she was then called, the Great Carrack, and captured her after a running fight of some sixteen hours' duration near Flores Island. Her value, with her freight, was estimated at something like 500,000l., and after a great deal of irregular plundering it did actually amount to more than 140,000l. The disputes as to the shares of what remained ran exceedingly high. Of irregular plunder Sir John's share was but small, and was declared by the commissioners to be within reason; but the disappointed men refused to accept this decision, and much recrimination followed. Out of this probably arose a quarrel with John Gilbert, whose name suggests some relationship to Raleigh. The quarrel resulted in a challenge sent by Burgh, in which he desired his antagonist not to use boyish excuses, or he would beat him like a boy. Gilbert accepted the challenge, claiming the choice of weapons and choosing single rapiers. In default of exact evidence the agreement of dates leads to the conclusion that the duel took place, and that Burgh was killed.

== Legacy ==
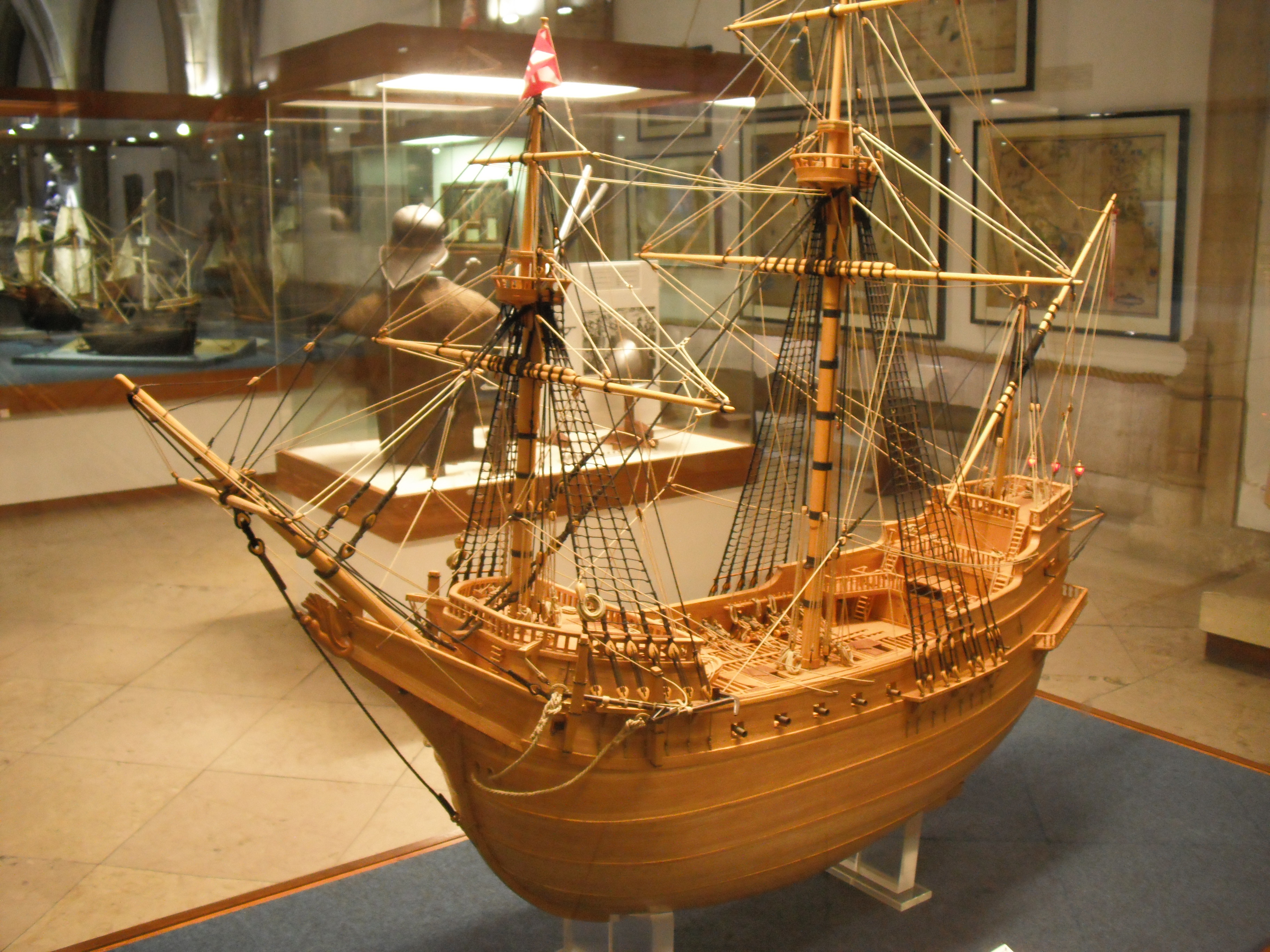
Model of the Portuguese carrack Madre de Dios. Burgh took her a prize in 1592

Burgh was buried in St. Andrew's Chapel in Westminster Abbey, where, in the following year, a tablet was erected to his memory. This has now disappeared; but, according to a copy of the inscription preserved by Croll, Burgh is said to have been taken away morte immaturâ ('untimely dead') in the thirty-second year of his age, on 7 March 1594. The inscription seems to imply, and – by Croll and others, including Dean Stanley – has been understood to imply, that Burgh was slain in boarding the Great Carrack. It distinctly states, however, that he brought the Carrack to England, and was most honourably received. The bold and crafty enemy whom Burgh despised, and at whose hands he fell, may very well have been Gilbert. Burke, giving an English version of this inscription, renders it 'he fell by an untimely death in the fifty-third year of his age'; and it is so repeated in later editions. This evidently is a mistake. The age of fifty-three seems incompatible with the morte immaturâ præreptus, as well as with the known age of William, Lord Burgh, born in or about 1525, of whom Sir John was the third son.

== Name ==
Burgh's name has been spelt in different ways. Edwards, who in most points is scrupulously accurate, gives it as Borough, and that while immediately referring to a holograph letter with a clear and legible signature, Jo. Burgh. It may therefore be likely that if John Burgh was a distinct person from that William Burroughs, the comptroller of the navy, who commanded the Lion in Francis Drake's expedition to Cádiz in 1587.

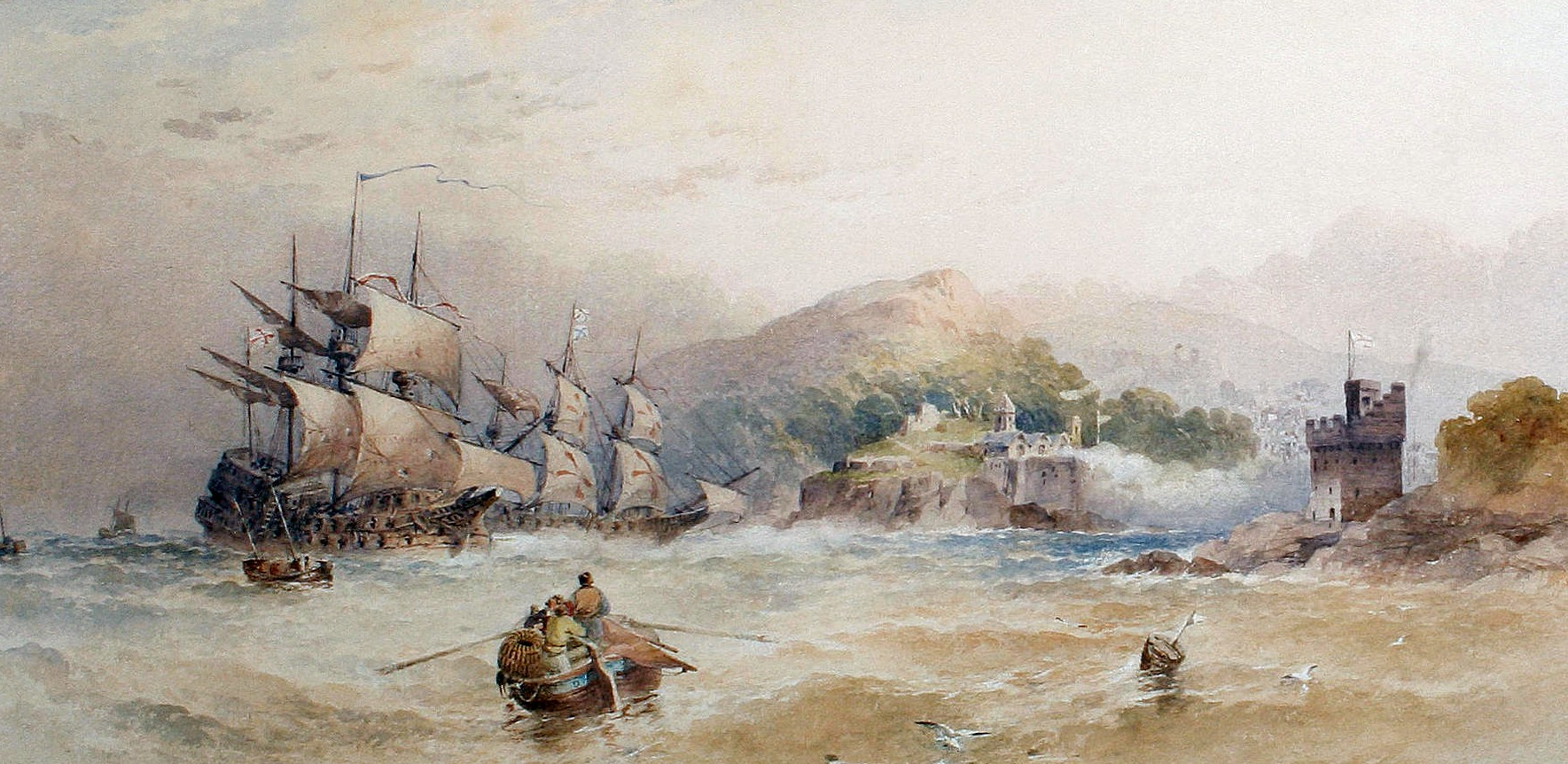
The arrival of the Great Carrack Madre de Dios at Dartmouth Harbour, 18 September 1592; envisaged in a 19th-century watercolour

Coat of arms of Burgh of Gainsborough, Co. Lincoln.
Escutcheon Azure, three fleurs-de-lis, ermine.

== Sources ==
- Burke, Bernard (1866). A Genealogical History of the Dormant, Abeyant, Forfeited, and Extinct Peerages of the British Empire. New ed. London: Harrison. p. 90.
- Croll, J. (1711). The Antiquities of St. Peter’s or the Abbey Church of Westminster. London: J. N. pp. 198–199.
- Edwards, Edward (1868). The Life of Sir Walter Ralegh. Vol. 1. London: Macmillan & Co. pp. 49, 146.
- Edwards, Edward (1868). The Life of Sir Walter Ralegh. Vol. 2. London: Macmillan & Co. pp. 60, 62.
- Green, Mary Anne Everett, ed. (1867). Calendar of State Papers, Domestic Series, of the Reign of Elizabeth, 1591–1594. London: Longmans, Green, Reader, and Dyer. p. 477.
- Nicolas, Nicholas Harris (1857). The Historic Peerage of England. London: John Murray. p. 83.
- Stevens, M. A. (2004). "Burgh, Sir John (1561/2–1594), soldier". Oxford Dictionary of National Biography (online ed.). Oxford University Press. doi:10.1093/ref:odnb/3993. (Subscription, Wikipedia Library access or UK public library membership required.)
- British Library, Egerton MS. 1943, f. 1.

Attribution:

- This article incorporates text from a publication now in the public domain: Laughton, John Knox (1886). "Burgh, John". In Stephen, Leslie (ed.). Dictionary of National Biography. Vol. 7. London: Smith, Elder & Co. pp. 322–323.
