= Chalupa (boat) =

Type of boat

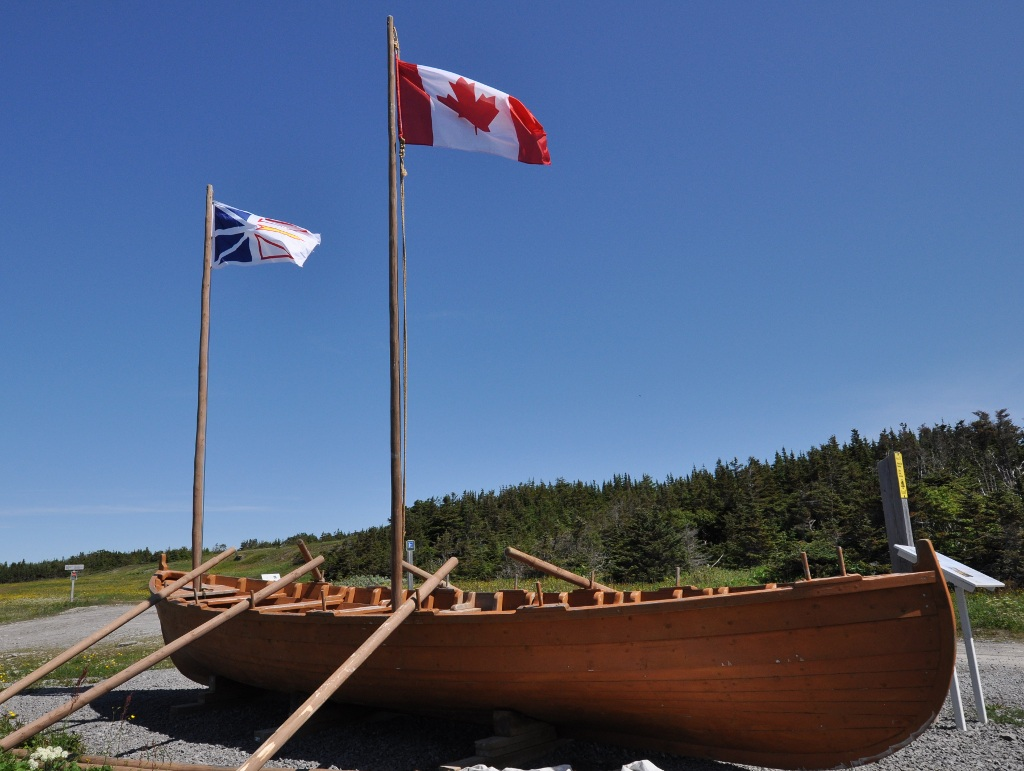
Chalupa at Port au Choix, Newfoundland

A chalupa (Spanish word coming from the Basque Txalupa) is a small boat that functions as a shallop, water taxi or gondola, such as those seen at the "floating gardens" of Xochimilco south of Mexico City, Mexico. Txalupa is originally the name of the type of whaling boat used by the Basques in the mid-16th century in what is now Newfoundland and Labrador.

== Description ==
Chalupa boats are normally rowed or poled, and less commonly motorized. Common characteristics are shallow drafts and narrow benches or seats for one, two or three passengers. A chalupa is not to be confused with a trajinera, which is a boat housing long benches along the edges, and a table through the middle, and poled by a standing person.

These boats are typical of Mexico City's Xochimilco channel and are frequented by local families for weekend picnics on the water. Chalupas transit on the same channel offering food, beverages, or even live music trios to the trajineras.

Chalupa in Portuguese is a small boat used for cabotage, either with oars or sails, in the latter case with a single mast.

The mid-16th century chalupa used by the Basque whalers was 8 metres (26 ft) long, and would have been manned by a steersman, five oarsmen, and a harpooner. Examples of four of these have been discovered in Canada at Red Bay in what is now Newfoundland and Labrador since 1978. One such chalupa has been given extensive conservation treatment, and as of July 1998 was on display in the visitor centre of Red Bay National Historic Site of Canada.
