= Alonso de Bazán =

Spanish naval commander

Alonso de Bazán (c.1530-1604), son of Admiral Álvaro de Bazán the Elder, Marquis del Viso, and brother of the better known Admiral Álvaro de Bazán, 1st Marquis of Santa Cruz, was a Spanish naval commander during the Anglo–Spanish War (1585–1604) and the Eighty Years' War.

== Notable military actions ==
In 1565, he helped his brother during the Blockade of the Tetuan river. He participated in the Battle of Lepanto as part of Álvaro's galley squad.

In 1584, inspired by his father's work to create design of ships which combined sailing and rowing power, he created the galizabra, a hybrid of galley and zabra.

In 1588, he was intended have been part of a fleet which would support the Spanish Armada that was invading England. After the failure of invasion, he transported infantry troops to La Coruña and Lisbon, in preparation of an incoming English counter-offensive.

In 1589, after the defeat of the English Armada, commanded by Sir Francis Drake, Alonso de Bazan went after the English fleet with his galleys and captured three vessels from Drake's retreating ships off Lisbon.

In 1590, at the start of the Brittany Campaign he transported some Tercio troops from the peninsula to France to help the Catholics in their fight against the French Protestants.

September 9, 1591, was the date of his greatest military action of his career: the Battle of Flores, where a fleet of 55 vessels he commanded fought and defeated the 22-ship fleet of Thomas Howard, 1st Earl of Suffolk, who was trying to capture the Spanish treasure fleet.

In 1592, however, Bazán was unsuccessful at catching English privateers at the second Battle of Flores. He was temporarily disgraced in the court for his defeat here.

In 1594, in the Azores, he defeated another English fleet, led by the Earl of Cumberland, that was trying to attack the ships coming from America.

In 1597, he took part in the victory against the failed English invasion known as the Essex-Raleigh Expedition.

In 1604, he died, being replaced by Admiral Luis Fajardo in his position left as captain general of the Navy of the Ocean Sea.

== Bibliography ==
- Nicieza, Guillermo (16 June 2025). Almirantes del Imperio: Los grandes comandantes de las Armadas españolas del siglo XVI. ISBN 978-84-414-4448-5.
