= Cinco Chagas (1559) =

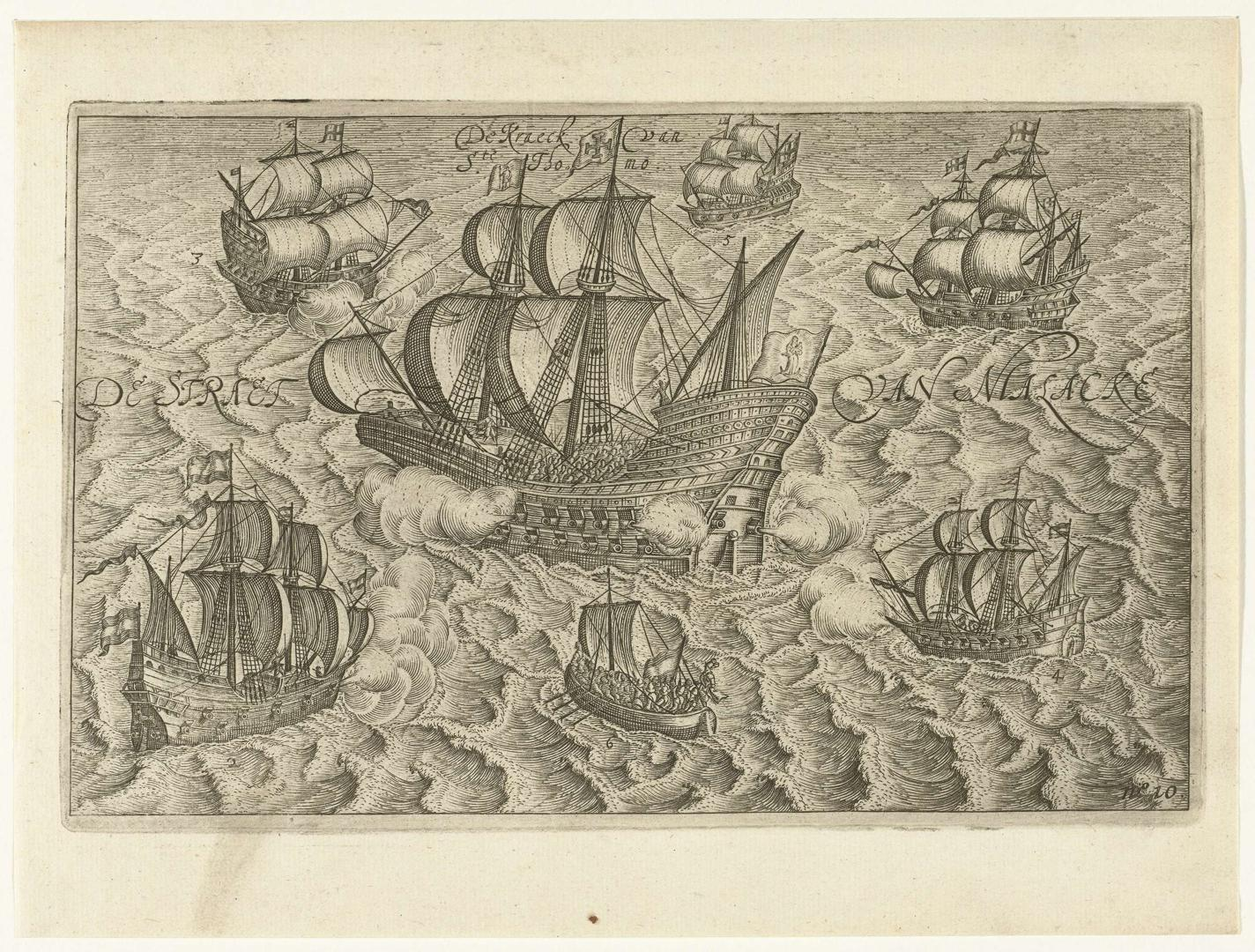
- The Chagas is similar to this large Portuguese ship that was captured by the English and the Dutch in 1602.

History

Portugal
- Name: Cinco Chagas
- Builder: Constantino de Braganza
- Fate: Abandoned as a hulk, 1587

General characteristics
- Class & type: Carrack
- Tons burthen: 1,500 to 2,000 tons
- Complement: About 900 passengers + 100 crew
- Armament: 35–40 bronze cannons, not including swivel guns

Cinco Chagas (English: Five Wounds) was a Portuguese carrack She was constructed from 1559 to 1560 in Goa. The Portuguese viceroy Dom Constantino de Braganza supervised the process. C. R. Boxer considers her to have been "probably the most famous of the India-built carracks." Cinco Chagas, nicknamed Constantina, was in service for around twenty six years, making nine or ten trips between Portugal and the East Indies. She was also a flagship for five Portuguese viceroys. The historian Dave Horner writes that this was probably a record, because ships were "lucky if they survived two or three roundtrips".

At the end of her career, she was laid up as a hulk in Lisbon harbour. When she was finally broken-up, King Philip II of Spain, who had become the King of Portugal in 1580, acquired the ship's keel as a trophy, and was buried in a coffin made from its wood in 1598 as a symbol of his empire's global domination.

== See also ==
- List of longest wooden ships
- Henry Grace à Dieu
- Adler von Lübeck
- Baochuan
- Ganj-i-Sawai
- Javanese jong

== Bibliography ==
- Amaral, Melchior Estacio Do (2010). Tratado das batalhas e sucessos do Galeão Sanctiago com os Olandeses na Ilha de Sancta Elena: e da náo Chagas com os Vngleses antre as Ilhas dos Açores. Nabu Press. ISBN 978-1149563519. (Portuguese)
- Andrews, Kenneth R. (3 Jan 1964). Elizabethan Privateering 1583-1603. Cambridge: Cambridge University Press. pp. 180–81. ISBN 9780521040327.
- Boxer, C. R. (Charles Ralph) (1959). The tragic history of the sea, 1589-1622 : narratives of the shipwrecks of the Portuguese East Indiamen Saõ Thome ́(1589), Santo Alberto (1593), Saaõ Joaõ Baptista (1622), and the journeys of the survivors in South East Africa. Internet Archive. Published by the Hakluyt Society at the University P.
- Boxer, C. R. (Charles Ralph) (1984). From Lisbon to Goa, 1500-1750 : studies in Portuguese maritime enterprise. Internet Archive. London : Variorum Reprints. ISBN 978-0-86078-142-4.
- Gray, Albert (1887). The voyage of François Pyrard of Laval to the East Indies, the Maldives, the Moluccas and Brazil volume II part I. London: Hakluyt Society.
- Horner, Dave (1971). The Treasure Galleons: Clues to Millions in Sunken Gold and Silver. Dodd, Mead - University of Texas. ISBN 9780396063780.
- Finlay, Robert (2010). The Pilgrim Art: Cultures of Porcelain in World History. Berkerley, CA: University of California Press. ISBN 978-0520244689.
- Southey, Robert; Bell, Robert (1833). The British admirals. With an introductory view of the naval history of England. Brandeis University Libraries. London, Printed for Longman, Rees, Orme, Brown, Green & Longmans and John Taylor.
