= Richard Hawkins =

English seaman and explorer (1562–1622)

Admiral Sir Richard Hawkins
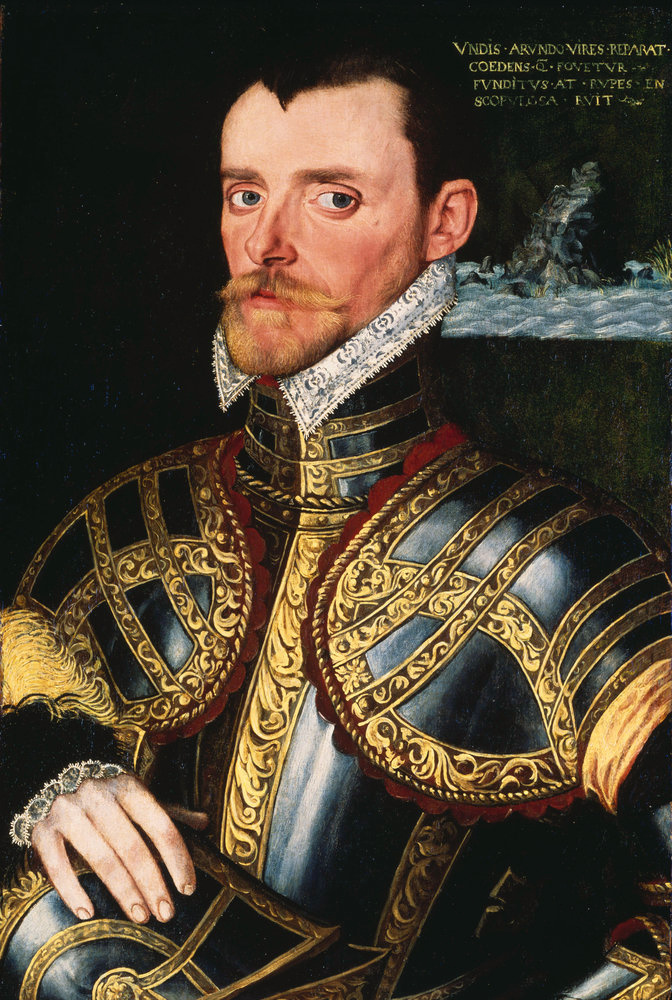
- Portrait by an unknown artist in the National Maritime Museum, Greenwich
- Born: c. 1562
- Died: 17 April 1622; London, England
- Occupations: Navy, Privateer
- Title: Sir
- Parent: Admiral Sir John Hawkins

Admiral Sir Richard Hawkins (or Hawkyns) (c. 1562 – 17 April 1622) was an English seaman, explorer and privateer. He was the son of Admiral Sir John Hawkins.

== Biography ==
He was from his earlier days familiar with ships and the sea, and in 1582 he accompanied his uncle, William Hawkins, to the West Indies. In 1585 he was captain of a galliot in Drake's expedition to the Spanish main, in 1588 he commanded a queen's ship against the Armada, and in 1590 his father's expedition at the coast of Portugal.

In 1593 he purchased the galleon Dainty (built for the voyage of discovery), a vessel originally built for his father and used by him in his expeditions, and sailed for the West Indies, the Spanish Main and the South Seas. It seems clear that his project was to prey on the oversea possessions of Spanish crown. Hawkins, however, in an account of the voyage written thirty years afterwards, maintained, and by that time perhaps had really persuaded himself, that his expedition was undertaken purely for the purpose of geographical discovery.

After visiting the coast of Brazil, the Dainty encountered a storm off the mouth of the Magellan Strait and was blown eastward. On 2 February 1594, Hawkins saw land "... about nine of the clocke in the morning, wee descried land, which bare South-West of us, which we looked not for so timely and coming neerer and neerer unto it, by the lying, wee could not conjecture what land it could be... It hath great Rivers of fresh waters; for the out-shoot of them colours the Sea ... The Land, for that it was discovered in the Reigne of Queene Elizabeth, my Sovereigne Lady and Mistris, and a Mayden Queene, and at my cost and adventure, in a perpetual memory of her chastitie, and remembrance of my endevours, I gave it the name of Hawkins Maiden land ... the Westernmost part lyeth some threescore leagues from the neerest Land of America". This land is now known as the Falkland Islands.

Hawkins then sailed back to the South American mainland and passed through the Straits of Magellan, and in due course reached Valparaíso.

Having plundered the town, Hawkins pushed north, and in June 1594, a year after leaving Plymouth, he arrived in the Bay of San Mateo, at the mouth of the Esmeraldas river, nowadays Ecuador, at the position 1°1′2.6″N 79°36′30.5″W. Here the Dainty was attacked by two Spanish ships. Hawkins was hopelessly outmatched, but Dainty's crew defended her with gallantry. At last, when he himself had been severely wounded, 27 of his men killed, and the Dainty was nearly sinking, he surrendered on 1 July 1594 on the promise of a safe-conduct out of the country for himself and his crew.

Through no fault of the Spanish commander, this promise was not kept. In 1597 Hawkins was sent to Spain, and imprisoned first at Seville and subsequently at Madrid. He was released in 1602, and, returning to England, was knighted in 1603 and elected Mayor of Plymouth the same year.

During the voyage, Hawkins made a series of observations about the efficacy of citrus fruits, specifically "sower oranges and lemmons," for successfully treating scurvy—a debilitating disease for early explorers and sailors. While James Lind is often credited with proving the benefits of citrus for curing scurvy, Hawkins, more than a century earlier, was also convinced of its benefits and wrote about it: "This is a wonderful secret of the power and wisedome of God, that hath hidden so great and unknown virtue in this fruit, to be a certaine remedie for this infirmitie"

In 1604 he became Member of Parliament for Plymouth and Vice-Admiral of Devon, a post which, as the coast was swarming with pirates (following the prohibition of English privateering in 1603), was no sinecure. In this role, Hawkins was more sympathetic to English pirates than to their often-Spanish victims, rarely taking pirates to trial, instead either taking the pirates' loot or selling a "discharge" to them before releasing them. Aside from a brief suspension between August 1606 and April 1607, he retained this post till 1610.

In 1605, Hawkins was named in the founding charter of the Spanish Company as one of the 557 founding members. In 1620 to 1621 he was vice-admiral, under Sir Robert Mansell of the fleet sent into the Mediterranean to reduce the Algerian corsairs. He died in London on 17 April 1622.

== Works ==
Hawkins wrote the memories of his trip under the title Voiage into the South Sea (1622), which became the most famous adventure of the Elizabethan era, re-published by the Hakluyt Society in 1847, and reworked in Charles Kingsley's Westward Ho! (1855). He depicts the Spaniards in the Americas in a positive way, judging them as "temperate" and "gentle".

== See also ==
- Bill
