= Martil Valley =

Valley in Tetouan, Morocco

Coordinates: 35°37′N 05°16′W

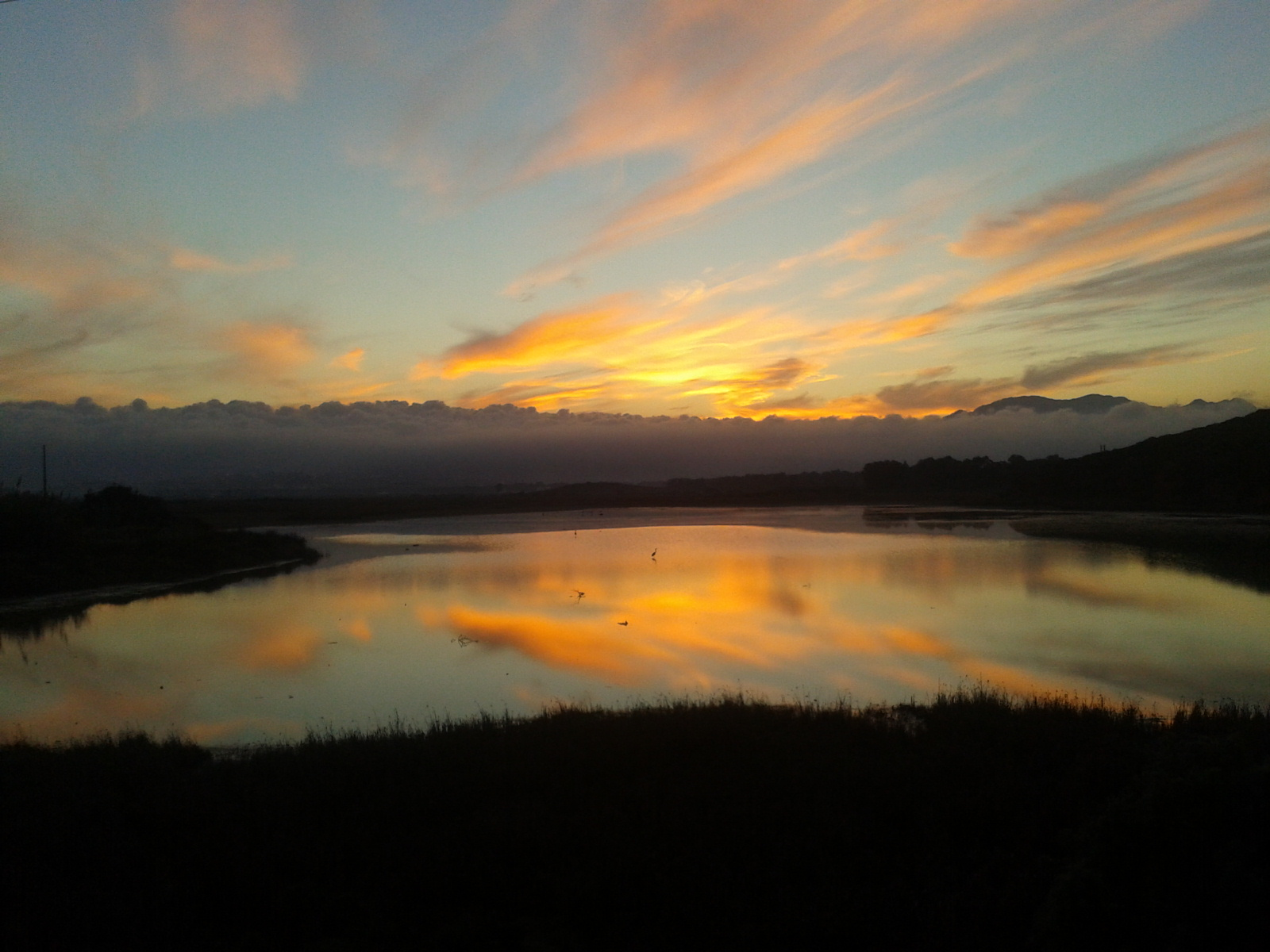

Martil Valley (Arabic: وادي مرتيل) is situated to the northeast of Tetouan, Morocco. It is about 10 to 15 km long.

The name comes from the river that crosses the valley, formerly known as Río Martín, during the Spanish protectorate period in the first half of the 20th century. The river flows into the Mediterranean Sea at the sea resort of Martil.
