= List of ships of the English Armada =

Ships of the 1589 English Counter Armada

The English Armada, also known as the Counter Armada, was an attack fleet sent against Spain by Queen Elizabeth I of England that sailed on April 28, 1589, during the undeclared Anglo-Spanish War (1585–1604) and the Eighty Years' War under Sir Francis Drake and Sir John Norris with three tasks:

- Destroy the battered Spanish Atlantic fleet, which was being repaired in ports of northern Spain
- Make a landing at Lisbon, Portugal and raise a revolt there against King Philip II (Philip I of Portugal) installing the pretender Dom António, Prior of Crato to the Portuguese throne
- Take the Azores if possible so as to establish a permanent base.

The expedition ended in a heavy defeat and none of the objectives were achieved. Dozens of ships were lost, thousands of English soldiers and sailors died, and heavy economic losses were incurred, in a similar disaster to the Spanish Armada. The attempt to restore the Portuguese Crown from Spain was unsuccessful, and the opportunity to strike a decisive blow against the weakened Spanish Navy was lost. The expedition resulted in very heavy losses in English lives and ships, and depleted the financial resources of England's treasury, which had been carefully restored during the long reign of Elizabeth I, Its failure was so embarrassing that, even today, England barely acknowledges it ever happened. Through this lost opportunity, Philip was able revive his navy the very next year, sending 37 ships with 6,420 men to Brittany where they established a base of operations on the Blavet river. The English and Dutch ultimately failed to disrupt the various fleets of the Indies despite the great number of military personnel mobilized every year. Thus, Spain remained the predominant power in Europe for several decades.

== List of Squadron Commanders ==
- Sir Francis Drake, commander of the Squadron of the Revenge and admiral of the fleet
- Sir John Norris, commander of the Squadron of the Nonpareil and general of the army
- Thomas Fenner, vice-admiral and commander of the Squadron of the Dreadnought
- Edward Norris, John's brother, commander of the Squadron of the Foresight
- Roger Williams, commander of the Squadron of the Swiftsure

== Composition of the fleet ==
As recorded on the list of April 8 1589 o.s., there were Royal galleons, English armed merchantmen, Dutch flyboats, pinnaces and other ships for a total of 180 vessels broken down thusly:

Assignment	Ships
Troops and mariners	115
Baggage	33
Horses	10
Victuals	10
Munitions	2
Support	3
Pioneers	7

The list of April 9 o.s. names 84 ships divided amongst five squadrons each with "near about 15 flyboats", which would give a total of about 160. However, in the payment list of September 5, 1589 o.s. naming 102 ships that returned, there are 33 ships named that were not on the April 9 o.s. list. Those 33 ships were not flyboats hence they should be added to the 160 from the April 9 o.s. list. With expectations of sizable profit and this expedition being mostly commercial, and last minute additions being made up until the fleet sailed on April 28, one cannot really give a precise total number of ships but at least 193 can be documented. Nevertheless, what is rather telling is a February 15, 1591 o.s. notice to the Lord High Treasurer of England, Burghley, wherein the number of vessels was "180 and other ships". It's not outside the realm of possibility that the number "reached nearly two hundred sail." Furthermore, of the 84 ships on the April 9 o.s. list that set sail, only 69 appear on the September 5 o.s. list, thus, according to Wernham, 17 ships were lost. But the number of those not listed and failed to return is unknown. In addition to the 69 that are known to have sailed and returned, another 33 returned with them; most of them medium sized. Considering the number of boats that sailed, many of them small, it must be the case that the losses among these small boats was extremely high. So, without any more precise information, a figure of 70-90 ships lost does not seem exaggerated.

Complement	Men
Soldiers	17,390
Cavalrymen	95
English mariners	3,200
Dutch mariners	900
Pioneers	295
Ship captains, officers and servants	1,500
Total	23,375

In the April 8 o.s. list, there were two different figures recorded for the number of men participating in the expedition. The first, 23,375, is what most historians and authors have used however at the end of this document, the total number of men had increased to 27,667. A critical analysis of the document reveals the figure of 23,375 is illusory, especially when below the signatures of Drake and Norris, and the confirmation of the Lord High Treasurer Burghley, there is the postscript: Signed J. Norris, F. Drake. Endorsed by Burghley as 8 April 1589. The numbers of men for the army and of ships and of foot at end in his hand 27,667. The September 5 o.s. payment list goes on to state that 3,722 men survived of which 1,042 received some pay.

=== Ships of the Squadrons ===
The fleet was divided into five squadrons as listed below. Each squadron included fifteen (15) flyboats which were not named in any of the known lists.

==== Squadron of The Revenge ====
The "first" squadron consisting of seventeen named ships and fifteen flyboats led by admiral Francis Drake on the flagship Revenge.

Name	Home Port	Tons	Captain	Survivors	Fate	Note
Revenge	Her Majesty's	500	Francis Drake	200	Ship returned home; 56 men received their pay	The Revenge served against the 1588 Armada.
Tiger	London	200	Captain John Young	60	Ship returned home; 36 men received their pay	The Tiger, formerly Sea Dragon, served against the 1588 Armada. John Young served against the 1588 Armada.
Bark Reynolds	London	200	Reynold Goldingham	60	Ship returned home; 9 men received their pay	
Prudence	Portsmouth	200	Captain Riddelsden	60	Ship returned home; 44 men received their pay	The Prudence served against the 1588 Armada.
Veyntyard (Vynearde, Vineyard)	London	180	Captain Dale	40	Ship returned home; 28 men received their pay	The Vineyard served against the 1588 Armada. Captain Dale served against the 1588 Armada.
Gift of God	Harwich	160	Captain Troughton	50	Ship returned home; None of the men received their pay	
Daniel	Yarmouth	190	Captain Christopher Piggot	24	Ship returned home; None of the men received their pay	The Daniel served against the 1588 Armada. Christopher Piggot served against the 1588 Armada.
Centurion	London	260	John Fisher	60	Ship returned home; 39 men received their pay	The Centurion served against the 1588 Armada. John Fisher served against the 1588 Armada.
Thomas	Plymouth	150	Captain Martin		Lost	
Gift	Dover	72	Captain Neale		Lost	
Primrose	Portsmouth	140	Captain Weynold	30	Ship returned home; None of the men received their pay	Captain Weynold served against the 1588 Armada.
Manuel (Emmanuel)	Dartmouth	120	Captain Wilson		Lost	
Mayflower	Bricklersea	100	Captain Bringborne	16	Ship returned home; 1 man received his pay	The Mayflower served against the 1588 Armada.
Diana	Hampton	90	Captain Webbe		Lost	
Greyhound	Plymouth	40	Captain Crockeham	16	Ship returned home; 17 men received their pay	
Advice	Her Majesty's	50	Samuel Foxcroft	20	Ship returned home; 17 men received their pay	The Advice served against the 1588 Armada. Samuel Foxcroft served against the 1588 Armada.
Susan	Aldeburgh	140	Captain Clifford	30	Ship returned home; 17 men received their pay	
15 Flyboats	NA	NA	NA	MIA	No record of their return	

==== Squadron of the Nonpareil ====
Seventeen ships and fifteen flyboats led by general of the army John Norris.

Name	Home Port	Tons	Captain	Survivors	Fate	Note
Nonpareil	Her Majesty's	500	Captain Sackville	200	Ship returned home; 68 men received their pay	Formerly called the Philip & Mary, the Nonpareil served against the 1588 Armada.
Samaritian	London	200	Captain Lylley	40	Ship returned home; 11 men received their pay	
Roger and Catherine	Newcastle	100	Captain Fowler	20	Ship returned home; 1 man received his pay	
James	Ipswitch	180	Captain Bynder	20	Ship returned home; None of the men received their pay	
William	Ipswitch	160	Captain Boyer	16	Ship returned home; None of the men received their pay	The William of Ipswitch served against the 1588 Armada.
Mayflower	Yarmouth	190	Captain Bringborne	30	Ship returned home; None of the men received their pay	
Golden Nobel	London	240	Captain Adam Seager	60	Ship returned home; 27 men received their pay	The Golden Nobel served against the 1588 Armada. Adam Seager served against the 1588 Armada.
Fortune	Plymouth	150	Captain Williams		Lost	
Mary Jarman	Lynn	100	Captain Bailey	30	Ship returned home; 5 men received their pay	
Godspeed	Hampton	140	Captain Cotton		Lost	
Gift of God	Hampton	120	Captain Richeman		Lost	
William	Lynn	72	Captain Barthridge		Lost	
Golden Hind	London	50	Captain William Adams		Lost	This is not the same Golden Hind that Drake used to circumnavigate the world, it was on exhibition in Deptford at the time. The Golden Hind served against the 1588 Armada. William Adams served against the 1588 Armada.
Phoenix	Dartmouth	100	Captain Champernon		Lost	The Phoenix served against the 1588 Armada.
Red Lion	Ipswitch	160	Captain West	16	Ship returned home; 1 man received his pay	The Red Lion served against the 1588 Armada.
Gregory	London	180	Captain Ambrose Mannington	40	Ship returned home; 17 men received their pay	Ambrose Mannington served against the 1588 Armada.
The Bark Taylor	London	150	NA	30	Ship returned home; 10 men received their pay	
15 Flyboats	NA	NA	NA	MIA	No record of their return	

==== Squadron of the Dreadnought ====
Seventeen ships and fifteen flyboats led by captain Thomas Fenner, vice-admiral.

Name	Home Port	Tons	Captain	Survivors	Fate	Note
Dreadnought	Her Majesty's	400	Captain Thomas Fenner	160	Ship returned home; 24 men received their pay	The Dreadnought served against the 1588 Armada. Thomas Fenner served against the 1588 Armada.
Edward Bonaventure	London	300	Captain Thomas Baker	100	Ship returned home; 46 men received their pay	The Edward Bonaventure served against the 1588 Armada.
Toby	Harwich	200	Captain John Cordinall	40	Ship returned home; 9 men received their pay	John Cordinall served against the 1588 Armada.
Tiger	Plymouth	200	Captain William Hawkins	50	Ship returned home; 9 men received their pay	Sir William Hawkins served against the 1588 Armada.
Pelican	Aldeburgh	180	Captain Appleton	30	Ship returned home; 6 men received their pay	
William	Wells	160	Captain Madeley	16	Ship returned home; None of the men received their pay	
Crescent	Dartmouth	190	Captain Gifford		Lost	The Crescent served against the 1588 Armada.
Salomon	London	210	Captain James Lancaster	58	Ship returned home; 47 men received their pay	The Salomon, a.k.a. Salmon, served against the 1588 Armada. James Lancaster served against the 1588 Armada.
Susanne	Blackeney	130	Captain Whitehand	25	Ship returned home; None of the men received their pay	
Bartholomew	Exmouth	140	Captain Rainsford		Lost	The Bartholomew served against the 1588 Armada.
William and Joan	Lynn	130	Captain Kelly	30	Ship returned home; 4 men received their pay	
Antelope	Plymouth	120	Captain Haulse	24	Ship returned home; 23 men received their pay	Captain Haulse served against the 1588 Armada.
Nightingale	Plymouth	120	Captain Triggs		Lost	The Nightingale served against the 1588 Armada.
White Lion	Bristol	100	Captain Horwell	29	Ship returned home; None of the men received their pay	The White Lion served against the 1588 Armada.
Relief	Portsmouth	80	NA		Lost	
Mary Katherine	Ipswitch	150	NA	16	Ship returned home; None of the men received their pay	
Tiger	Lee	140	Captain Jobson	30	Ship returned home; 23 men received their pay	
15 Flyboats	NA	NA	NA	MIA	No record of their return	

==== Squadron of the Swiftsure ====
Sixteen ships and fifteen flyboats led by captain Roger Williams.

Name	Home Port	Tons	Captain	Survivors	Fate	Note
Swiftsure	Her Majesty's	360	Captain Goring	160	Ship returned home; 40 men received their pay	The Swiftsure served against the 1588 Armada.
Toby	London	300	Captain Osborne	60	Ship returned home; None of the men received their pay	The Toby served against the 1588 Armada.
Hopewell	Orford (Orphanate)	200	Captain Jervis Wild		Lost	The Hopewell served against the 1588 Armada.
Gift	Dartmouth	250	Captain Ar. Gifford	50	Ship returned home; 1 man received his pay	
Greyhound	Aldeburgh	180	Captain Walt. Pullison	30	Ship returned home; 10 men received their pay	The Greyhound served against the 1588 Armada.
Charity	Newcastle	160	Captain Anthony Potts	36	Ship returned home; None of the men received their pay	Anthony Potts served against the 1588 Armada.
Minion	Fowey	150	Captain Atkins	30	Ship returned home; 1 man received his pay	
Valentine	Blackeney	160	Captain Endicke	25	Ship returned home; 1 man received his pay	
Bark Selenger	London	200	Captain Sellinger	40	Ship returned home; 25 men received their pay	The Bark Selenger served against the 1588 Armada.
Antelope	Lynn	150	Captain Burword	15	Ship returned home; 2 men received their pay	
John Trelany	Plymouth	120	Captain George Drake	20	Ship returned home; 13 men received their pay	
George Bonaventure	Blackeney	130	Captain Barker	25	Ship returned home; None of the men received their pay	The George Bonaventure served against the 1588 Armada.
Handmaid	Bristol	80	Captain Laughton	25	Ship returned home; None of the men received their pay	The Handmaid served against the 1588 Armada.
Edward Bonaventure	Cichester	70	Captain Ed. Fenner	12	Ship returned home; 2 men received their pay	Edward Fenner served against the 1588 Armada.
Emmanuel	Harwich	200	NA	20	Ship returned home; 3 men received their pay	
Grace of God	London	140	NA	30	Ship returned home; 20 men received their pay	
15 Flyboats	NA	NA	NA	MIA	No record of their return	

==== Squadron of the Foresight ====
Seventeen ships and fifteen flyboats led by captain Edward Norris.

Name	Home Port	Tons	Captain	Survivors	Fate	Note
Foresight	Her Majesty's	300	Captain William Winter	120	Ship returned home; 13 men received their pay	The Foresight served against the 1588 Armada. William Winter served against the 1588 Armada.
Merchant Royal	London	400	Captain Robert Flick	100	Ship returned home; 44 men received their pay	The Merchant Royal served against the 1588 Armada. Robert Flick served against the 1588 Armada.
Elizabeth	Yarmouth	200	Captain Musgrave	40	Ship returned home; 2 men received their pay	Captain Musgrave served against the 1588 Armada.
Minion	Plymouth	200	Captain Cripps		Lost	The Minion served against the 1588 Armada.
Mayflower	Lynn	150	Captain Alex Musgrave	40	Ship returned home; 2 men received their pay	The Mayflower served against the 1588 Armada. Alex Musgrave served against the 1588 Armada.
Seraphim	Dartmouth	220	Captain Norwood	40	Ship returned home; 4 men received their pay	
Bark Bonner	Plymouth	150	Captain Vaughan	30	Ship returned home; 23 men received their pay	The Bark Bonner served against the 1588 Armada.
Rubyon (Ruben)	Dover	140	Captain Nealls	30	Ship returned home; 10 men received their pay	
Unicorn	Bristol	150	Captain Johnson	33	Ship returned home; None of the men received their pay	The Unicorn served against the 1588 Armada. Captain Johnson served against the 1588 Armada.
Francis	Fowey	140	Captain Dyer		Lost	The Francis served against the 1588 Armada.
William	Plymouth	120	Captain Crosse	25	Ship returned home; 1 man received his pay	The William served against the 1588 Armada.
Bark Hawkins	London	120	Captain Josias	30	Ship returned home; 25 men received their pay	The Bark Hawkins served against the 1588 Armada.
Bark Parnell	Bricklersea (Briquelsey)	100	Captain William Furthor	20	Ship returned home; 6 men received their pay	
Hearty Anne	Chatham	60	Captain Heron	15	Ship returned home; 3 men received their pay	The Hearty Anne served against the 1588 Armada.
John	Newhaven	30	Captain John Pinfold	12	Ship returned home; None of the men received their pay	
William	Ipswitch	200	Captain Forth	30	Ship returned home; 8 men received their pay	The William served against the 1588 Armada.
Unity	London	120	NA	25	Ship returned home; 15 men received their pay	
15 Flyboats	NA	NA	NA	MIA	No record of their return	

==== Additional ships ====
These ships were named on the Sep. 5 o.s. list but not on the April 9 o.s. list. William Fenner was in command of the HMS Aid but didn't lead a squadron.

Name	Home Port	Tons	Captain	Survivors	Fate	Note
Aid	Her Majesty's	240	Captain William Fenner	80	Ship returned home; 4 men received their pay	The Aid served against the 1588 Armada. William Fenner served against the 1588 Armada.
Blessing	Portsmouth	80	NA	20	Ship returned home; None of the men received their pay	
Brownfish	Hoorn	150	NA	20	Ship returned home; 2 men received their pay	
Crested Eagle	Hamburg	200	NA	30	Ship returned home; 2 men received their pay	
Desire	London	10	NA	6	Ship returned home; None of the men received their pay	
Elizabeth Drake	NA	30	NA	16	Ship returned home; None of the men received their pay	The Elizabeth Drake served against the 1588 Armada.
Flyboat of Mr. How	NA	60	NA	16	Ship returned home; None of the men received their pay	
Flying Hart	Wering	150	NA	20	Ship returned home; 1 man received his pay	
Fortune	Aldeburgh	100	NA	20	Ship returned home; None of the men received their pay	The Fortune of Aldeburgh served against the 1588 Armada.
Fortune	Danzig	300	NA	30	Ship returned home; 4 men received their pay	
Fortune	Hamburg	200	NA	30	Ship returned home; 1 man received his pay	
Fortune	London	100	NA	20	Ship returned home; None of the men received their pay	
Francis	Liverpool	100	NA	20	Ship returned home; 1 man received his pay	
Gift	Lynn	100	NA	20	Ship returned home; 2 men received their pay	
Grace of God	Dover	110	NA	25	Ship returned home; 5 men received their pay	
Greyhound	London	80	NA	16	Ship returned home; None of the men received their pay	
Hope	Hamburg	200	NA	40	Ship returned home; 1 man received his pay	
Hopewell	London	80	NA	25	Ship returned home; 5 men received their pay	
Lion	Elsinore	Illegible	NA	30	Ship returned home; 13 men received their pay	
Lion	Edam	200	NA	20	Ship returned home; None of the men received their pay	
Little Francis	NA	10	NA	6	Ship returned home; 2 men received their pay	
Ma. Flyshborne	NA	60	NA	12	Ship returned home; 3 men received their pay	
Merlin	Her Majesty's	50	Ralph Bostock	30	Ship returned home; 4 men received their pay	
Moonlight	London	60	NA	12	Ship returned home; 5 men received their pay	
Murrayon	Hamburg	200	NA	20	Ship returned home; None of the men received their pay	
Myninge Lorel	NA	200	NA	40	Ship returned home; 1 man received his pay	
Red Lion	Newcastle	140	NA	30	Ship returned home; 19 men received their pay	
Relief	London	20	NA	10	Ship returned home; 6 men received their pay	
Sea [illegible]	Hamburg	200	NA	20	Ship returned home; None of the men received their pay	
Speedwell	NA	60	NA	12	Ship returned home; None of the men received their pay	The Speedwell served against the 1588 Armada.
Spreadeagle	Emden	200	NA	20	Ship returned home; 2 men received their pay	
Susan	London	100	NA	20	Ship returned home; 12 men received their pay	
Swan	NA	10	NA	6	Ship returned home; None of the men received their pay	
Young Froe	Lübeck	300	NA	20	Ship returned home; 2 men received their pay	
Diana	London	80	NA	16	Ship returned home; 3 men received their pay	The Diana served against the 1588 Armada.

== See also ==
- List of shipwrecks in the 16th century
- Brittany Campaign

== Notes ==
1. Throughout the Catholic world, the Gregorian calendar replaced the Julian calendar in October 1582 which corrected a 10-day error. England didn't adopt it until 1752 so all English State papers have Julian dates. Dates on original English source documents will be indicated herein with the suffix "o.s." for old style.

== Bibliography ==
- Hume, Martin (1896). The Year After the Armada: And Other Historical Studies. London: T. F. Unwin.
- Gorrochategui Santos, Luis (2018). English Armada: The Greatest Naval Disaster in English History. Oxford: Bloomsbury. ISBN 978-1350016996.
- Wernham, R. B. (1988). The Expedition of Sir John Norris and Sir Francis Drake to Spain and Portugal, 1589. Aldershot: Temple Smith for the Navy Records Society. ISBN 0566055783.
