= Thomas Fenner =

Thomas Fenner or Tom Fenner may refer to

- Thomas Fenner (sea captain) (died in or after 1593?), sea captain and Royal Navy officer
- Thomas Fenner House, historic site in Rhode Island named for Major Thomas Fenner (1652–1718)
- Thomas P. Fenner (1829–1912), American musician
- Thomas Fenner (footballer) (born 1904), English footballer
