= Zabra =

Spanish and Portuguese sailing ship from the 13th century

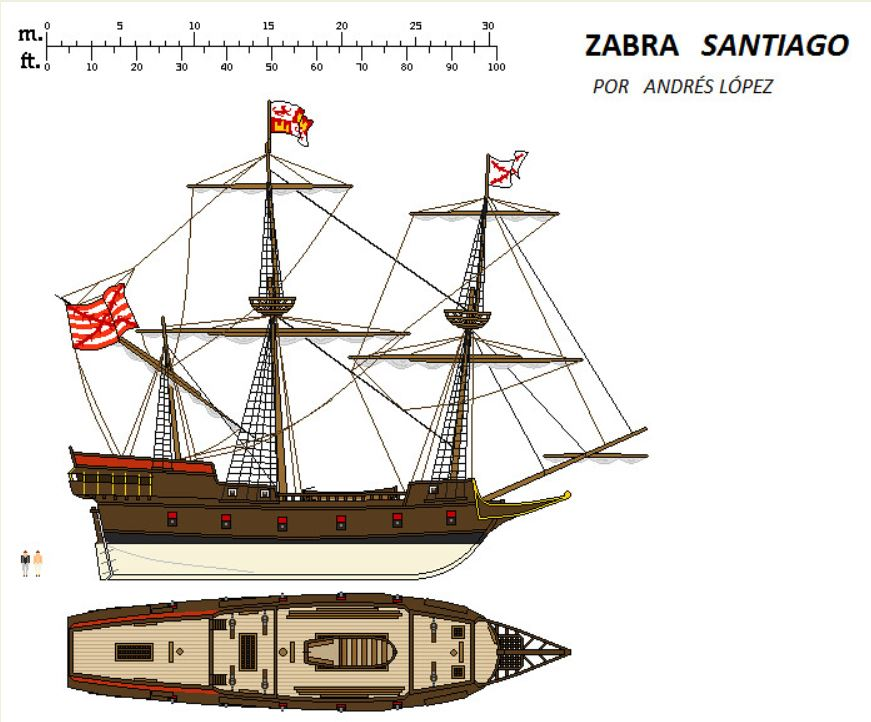
Profile and plan view of Santiago, largest zabra in the Spanish Armada

A zabra (zah-brə) was a small or midsized sailing vessel used off the coasts of Spain and Portugal to carry goods by sea from the 13th century until the mid-16th century; they were well-armed to defend themselves against pirates and corsairs.

Early Iberian documentary sources, such as the Estoria de España, refer to their use by the Moors and from about 1500 onwards a fleet of zabras developed in the coastal trade of Cantabria on the Cantabrian Sea, and fishermen began using them to exploit the fisheries of Ireland and North America. These zabras were fast, square-rigged row-sailers with two masts; they were rowed with 14 to 18 oars and had a tonnage of between 20 and 60 tons. Their ratio of beam to length was 1: 3.75–4.0. The smallest zabras had only a half deck or a poop deck, but the larger ones were covered with a flush deck.

Because of their excellent handling qualities, and despite their modest size, they were frequently used by the Crown of Castile for the transport of money and soldiers to Flanders, as well as in transatlantic voyages.

Zabras were used for exploration, reconnaissance and the dispatch of messages, and also for guarding the coasts and landfall areas that were of interest to the Crown and its overseas empire. Zabras were navigated and maneuvered under sail, and earlier versions could also be rowed by oarsmen. They were armed for both commerce and warfare. Although designed for use in the Cantabrian Sea, zabras were used in the Mediterranean Sea for Spain's Naples campaigns in the Italian Wars of 1495 and 1500, and in 1534 against the Barbary pirate, Barbarossa, the admiral of the Ottoman fleet.

Zabras made the transatlantic crossing between America and Spain in 30 days or less and could transport an average of about 100 tons of cargo in their holds. These two characteristics, speed and load capacity, in addition to their armaments, made them ideal substitutes for the ships of the Spanish treasure fleets, West Indies Fleets (Flota de Indias), when those ships could not make the annual crossing due to lack of time, danger of enemy attacks or some other cause.

== Characteristics ==
Similar in shape to a brigantine, the zabra was square-rigged with a lateen mizzen sail and had six banks of oars. While sails were necessary for crossing the Atlantic and traveling long distances, oars allowed for better maneuverability in the absence of wind, for ascending rivers, or for quickly escaping combat in shallow waters. They also allowed the main ship of an expedition to remain at a discrete distance offshore while the smaller ship reconnoitered an enemy port. Zabras often functioned as courier vessels and provided logistical support to the fleets as well. Several dozen zabras were used in postal and commercial traffic on the Bay of Biscay under the patronage of the Almirantazgo, the Spanish Admiralty.

Zabras evolved under the influence of galleon design, becoming stouter, with the forecastle removed and leaving a beakhead forward; the sides began to be covered with sentry boxes, the redoubts forward and aftward were fortified, and the hull lines further refined. Their tonnage increased, reaching 600 tons, and their guns and crew were increased as well.

With a typical gross tonnage of between 80 and 170 tons, zabras had elongated and flat hulls with fine lines, a marked sheer and a pronounced tumblehome that made the beam at deck-level much narrower than at the waterline. The ratio of beam to length was 1: 3.75–4.0.

Zabras had full square rigging with a sprit-sail on the bowsprit yard, foresails or foretopsails on the foremast, mainsails and topsails on the mainmast, and a lateen sail on the mizzen yard. They were very suitable for mail runs, reconnaissance and exploration missions; zabras typically mounted 10 guns and the crew usually did not exceed 60 men.

== Examples ==
Santiago, the largest zabra of the thirteen assembled for the Spanish Armada in 1588, mounted 19 guns and carried a crew of 40 sailors and 60 soldiers. Julia was the smallest zabra of the Armada, along with Augusta. Julia bore 14 pieces, was crewed by 72 mariners, and had 44 soldiers on board. (Note: Different figures are given by other sources for the number of mariners and soldiers aboard, but John Knox Laughton says the arithmetic of the La Armada Invencible by Capt. C. Fernandez Duro, copied from the original sent to the king by the Duke of Medina Sidonia, is in a "hopeless muddle".)
