= English ship Dreadnought (1573) =

Innovative warship

History

England
- Name: Dreadnought
- Builder: Deptford Dockyard
- Launched: 1573
- Fate: Broken up, 1648
- Notes: Participated in: Raid on Cádiz; Spanish Armada; Capture of Cádiz; Battle of Sesimbra Bay; Cádiz Expedition

General characteristics as built
- Class & type: 41-gun galleon
- Tons burthen: 360
- Propulsion: Sails
- Complement: 200
- Armament: 41 guns of various weights of shot

General characteristics after 1592 rebuild
- Tons burthen: 360
- Complement: 200

General characteristics after 1614 rebuild
- Class & type: 32-gun middling ship
- Tons burthen: 360
- Length: 80 ft (24 m) (keel)
- Beam: 30 ft (9.1 m)
- Depth of hold: 15 ft (4.6 m)
- Sail plan: Full-rigged ship
- Armament: 29 principal guns of various weights of shot, plus 4 smaller anti-personnel guns

Dreadnought (Note: The 'HMS' prefix was not used until the middle of the 18th century, but is sometimes applied retrospectively) was a 41-gun galleon of the Tudor navy, built by Mathew Baker and launched in 1573. Like HMS Dreadnought of 1906, she was a radical innovation over contemporary ships. When John Hawkins became Treasurer of the Navy in 1577, he had sailed all over the world, and his ideas contributed to the production of a new race-built series of galleons—of which Dreadnought was the second, following Foresight of 1570—without the high forecastle and aftcastle prevalent in earlier galleons. These "marvels of marine design" could reputedly "run circles around the clumsier Spanish competition."

Dreadnought took part in many of the naval engagements between Britain and Spain in the late 16th and early 17th centuries. Under Captain Thomas Fenner, she was part of Drake's fleet which "singed the King of Spain's Beard" with the raid on Cádiz in Spring 1587. Under George Beeston she was part of the English fleet which harassed most of the Spanish Armada in 1588. She was rebuilt for the first time in 1592. In 1596, with Sir Alexander Clifford as her captain, she was part of the Anglo-Dutch fleet which captured Cádiz. In 1599 she was in the Western Channel under George Fenner, while in 1601 under Sir Henry Palmer she was on the Thames.

On 2 June 1602, captained by Edward Manwaring, Dreadnought was part of Ricard Leveson's fleet which succeeded in capturing the Portuguese carrack Sao Valentinho at Cezimbra Roads In 1603, as hostilities with Spain concluded, she was in the English Channel under captain Hamphrey Reynolds.

Dreadnought was rebuilt again at Deptford in 1614 as a middling ship of 32 guns.

In 1625, with renewed hostilities against Spain, Dreadnought took part in yet another expedition to Cádiz, this time under a captain named Plumleigh, as part of a fleet commanded by Viscount Wimbledon. In 1628 she took part in the unsuccessful attempt to relieve the Siege of La Rochelle by sea.

In 1637, she was part of the Earl of Northumberland's fleet in the North Sea, commanded by Captain Henry Stradling and then by Thomas Kirke.

Dreadnought was broken up in 1648.
