= Thomas Fenner (sea captain) =

English sea captain

Captain Thomas Fenner
- Military career
- Allegiance: Kingdom of England
- Branch: Royal Navy
- Service years: c.1585–1589
- Rank: Captain
- Commands: Elizabeth Bonaventure; Dreadnought; Nonpareil
- Conflicts: Anglo-Spanish War; Drake's Great Expedition; Singeing the King of Spain's Beard; Spanish Armada; English Armada; Brittany campaign

Captain Thomas Fenner (fl.1564 – November 1593) was an English sea captain of the Elizabethan era. He served under Francis Drake in the Anglo-Spanish War, notably commanding a warship during the Spanish Armada. Details of Fenner's life are scant, but after leaving military service in about 1589 he may have involved himself in the financing of merchant ships. The historian David Loades suggests that he died in November 1593 when records mentioning him cease.

== Career ==
Thomas Fenner's origins are not clear, although Keeler says he was from Chichester. He also recorded himself as hailing from Earnley. He was probably a cousin of the British merchant George Fenner (c. 1540 – 1618), and was one of several members of the Sussex family who owned ships and privateered. In 1564 he participated in a trading voyage to Guinea made by three ships that returned to England laden with Portuguese sugar and brazilwood acquired under suspect circumstances. Following this venture he was summoned before the Admiralty Court to explain his acquisition of these goods out of a Portuguese merchant ship.

During the crisis of 1569–1572, trade ceased between England and Spain with French Huguenot and Dutch sailors preying on French Catholic and Spanish merchant ships. The Hawkins and Fenner families took advantage of the opportunity to join in the plunder, and Thomas Fenner, under a commission from William of Orange, waged private war on Spanish shipping in a newly built vessel, Bark Fenner. Little is recorded of his subsequent service at sea until 1585 when, described as a "veteran", he served under Drake as captain of the Elizabeth Bonaventure, Drake's fleet flagship in the Great Expedition, a privateering voyage to the West Indies. Fenner later served under Drake's command as captain of the Nonpareil when the Spanish Armada was sent by Philip II of Spain to attack England in 1588.

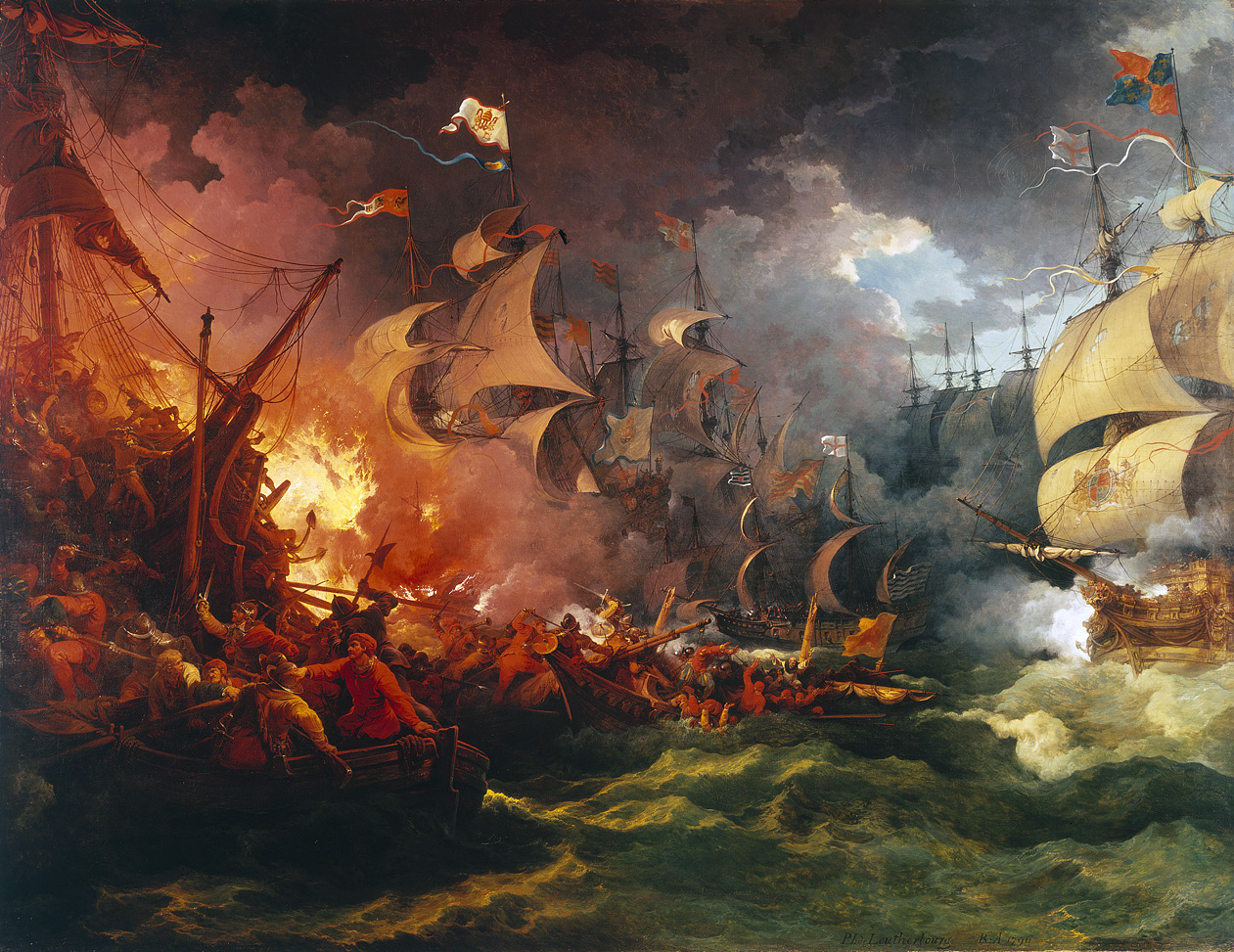
Defeat of the Spanish Armada by Philip James de Loutherbourg

Fenner commanded Dreadnought, a ship of 400 tons, in Drake's successful raid on Cádiz in the summer of 1587, after narrowly escaping shipwreck off Cape Finisterre at the outset of the cruise. The fleet of 23 ships and around 2,000 men had weighed anchor and sailed from Plymouth on 2 April 1587. Volumes found in the manuscript library of Samuel Pepys at Magdalene College, Cambridge, likely assembled for Pepys's planned history of the Royal Navy, contain the full text of Thomas Fenner's account of Drake's attack. He clearly says Drake decided to raid Cádiz after meeting two Zealand (Dutch) ships off Lisbon on 16 April, as mentioned by Richard Hakluyt in his The Principall Nauigations, Voyages, Traffiques, and Discoueries of the English Nation. In view of this fact, according to the historian Simon Adams, the commonly held belief that Edward Stafford, ambassador to the French court, informed Spanish ambassador Bernardino de Mendoza of Drake's orders to attack Cádiz but that they reached Philip II too late, needs to be reconsidered.

Fenner was a captain in the Royal Navy and a member of Lord High Admiral Howard's war council, which directly advised Elizabeth I. The British maritime strategist Julian Stafford Corbett called him "one of the most daring and experienced officers of his time". He served as Drake's second-in-command during the Drake–Norris Expedition in 1589. Norris and Drake disregarded Elizabeth's command to sail first to Santander, and attacked A Coruña instead. After a failed attack on Lisbon, and few prizes taken, a hundred men a day were dying from their wounds, scurvy, or starvation, and their bodies were thrown overboard. Fenner wrote to Sir Francis Walsingham that only three of his 300 men had not fallen sick, and 114 of them had died on his ship alone. With a rising death toll and diminishing foodstores on board the ships of the fleet, Drake's plan to attack the Azores was abandoned. Although he played a leading role in the enterprise, Fenner managed to escape blame for the expedition's failure.

In debt and disillusioned with military service, Fenner told Walsingham that he would use the remainder of his money to finance a voyage to India. It is not known whether the proposed voyage was made, although he did obtain letters of marque and the financial backing of John Bird (or Byrd), a London merchant. In 1591 he backed a three-ship merchant enterprise, and by 1593 was involved in the transport of troops across the English Channel for the Brittany campaign. After November that year all record of Fenner ceases. It is possible he died at this point. With several men of the same name active in the period, the chronology of Fenner's life is not certain. The historian David Loades notes that if Fenner was the same man serving in 1593 then he also married, being recorded as having a son who temporarily replaced him undertaking duties at Chatham.
