= English ship Foresight (1570) =

History

England
- Name: Foresight
- Builder: Deptford Dockyard
- Launched: 1570
- Fate: Broken up, 1604
- Notes: Captain Christopher Baker commanded the ship Foresight for the English Royal Fleet in the 1588 battle against the Spanish Armada.

General characteristics as built
- Class & type: 41-gun galleon
- Tons burthen: 294 tons
- Length: 78 ft (24 m)(keel)
- Beam: 27 ft (8.2 m)
- Depth of hold: 14 ft (4.3 m)
- Complement: 160
- Armament: 28 guns of various weights of shot

Foresight (Note: The 'HMS' prefix was not used until the middle of the 18th century, but is sometimes applied retrospectively) was a 28-gun galleon of the English Tudor navy, built by Mathew Baker at Deptford Dockyard and launched in 1570. It was a radical innovation over contemporary ships. When John Hawkins became Treasurer of the Navy in 1577, he had sailed all over the world, and his ideas contributed to the production of a new race-built series of galleons - of which the Foresight was the first - without the high fore- and after-castles prevalent in earlier galleons; these "marvels of marine design" could reputedly "run circles around the clumsier Spanish competition." As such, the Foresight was part of the English fleet which destroyed most of the Spanish Armada in 1588.

She was broken up in 1604.
