= English ship Nonsuch (1603) =

History

England
- Name: Philip and Mary, built 1555–56
- Renamed: Nonpareil in 1584; Nonsuch in 1605
- Fate: Sold, c. 1645

General characteristics as built
- Class & type: Galleon

General characteristics after 1603-05 rebuild
- Class & type: 32-gun great ship
- Tons burthen: 636
- Length: 88 ft (27 m) (keel)
- Beam: 34 ft (10 m)
- Depth of hold: 15 ft (4.6 m)
- Sail plan: Full-rigged ship
- Complement: 250 (1633)
- Armament: 32 carriage guns of various weights of shot, plus 6 smaller weapons

Nonsuch was a galleon of the Tudor navy. She was built on the orders of Queen Mary (reign, 1553–1558) in 1555–56 as the Philip and Mary and renamed twice during her career – first to Nonpareil when she was rebuilt at Deptford in 1584, and later as Nonsuch when she was again rebuilt from 1603 to 1605. (Note: The "HMS" prefix was not used until the middle of the 18th century, but is sometimes applied retrospectively)

Following her first rebuilding, she was mentioned in the Paris archives as part of Elizabeth I's fleet in 1588 in A Statement of the two fleets possessed by the Queen of England, with numbers and names of the ships, listed as "400 tons, 17 pieces each side, four pieces at the prow and the same at the stern. Her complement was 250 comprising 150 mariners, 30 gunners and 70 soldiers". The ship was under the command of Drake in 1588 – "Drake has also six large ships of the Queen's, namely :—Revenge, Hope, Nonpareil, Swiftsure, Aid and Advice, with 45 of the best merchant ships they could select, at the Isle of Wight."

On 14 February 1591 a warrant was made "to pay to Sir John Hawkins 1,566l. 13s. 4d. disbursed in setting forth the Nonpareil".

In June 1602 she was off the coast of Spain and attacked Cezimbra Bay near Lisbon (Portugal) which resulted in the capture of a large carrack loaded with treasure valued at a million ducats.

In 1603-05 she was rebuilt a second time as a great ship, and renamed Nonsuch. Now of 454 tons, she carried 32 primary guns (2 cannon periers, 12 culverins, 12 demi-culverins and 6 sakers) and 6 smaller and more anti-personnel weapons (2 falconets and 4 fowlers).

She was sold out of the navy in late 1645.
