= Juan de Tassis =

Juan de Tassis may refer to:

- Juan de Tassis, 1st Count of Villamediana (died 1607), father
- Juan de Tassis, 2nd Count of Villamediana (1582–1622), son
