= Villamediana =

Coordinates: 42°03′N 4°22′W

- municipality
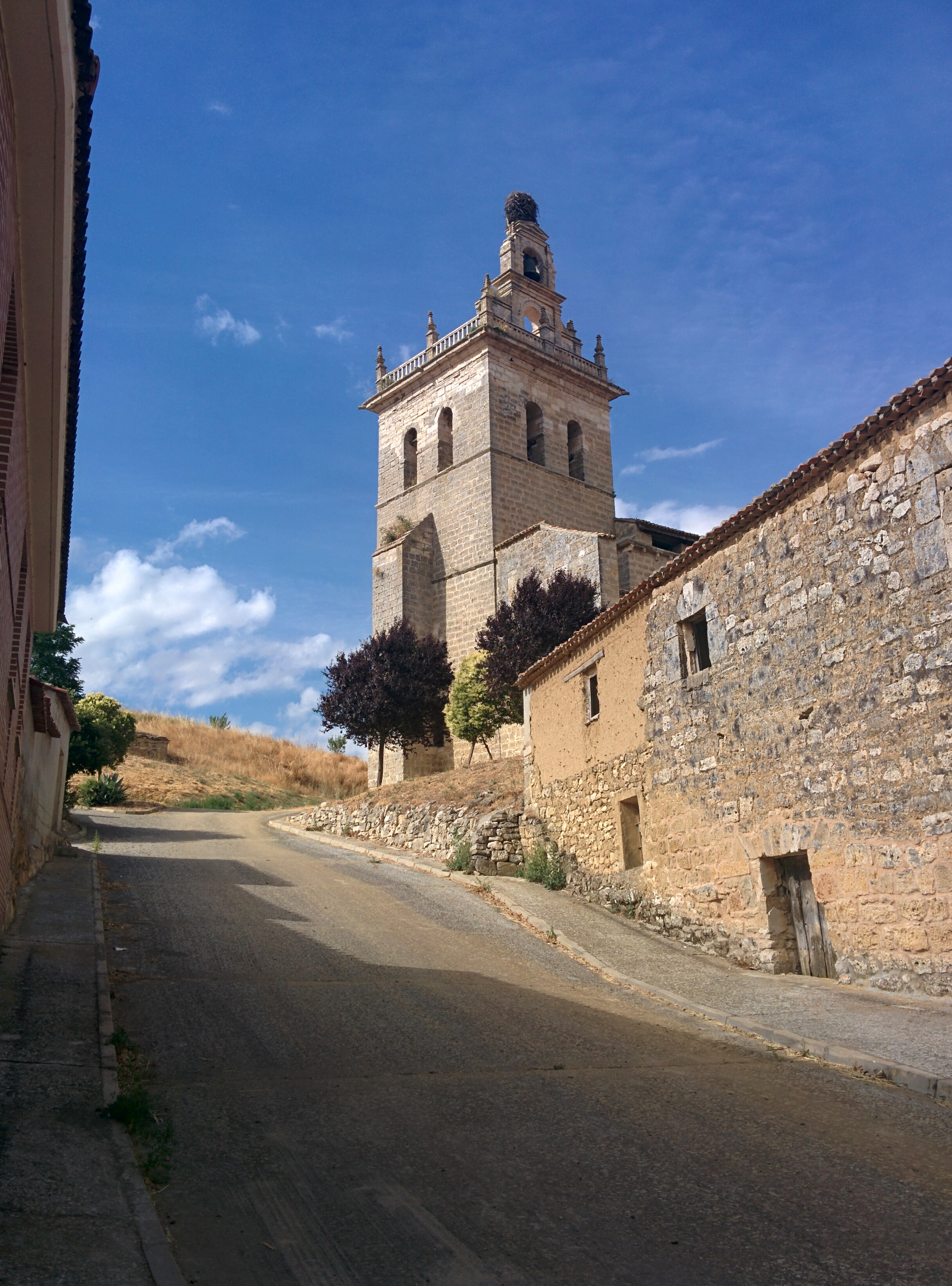

- Coat of arms
- Interactive map of Villamediana
- Country: Spain
- Autonomous community: Castile and León
- Province: Palencia
- Municipality: Villamediana

Area
  - Total: 58 km^{2} (22 sq mi)

Population (2025-01-01)
  - Total: 177
  - Density: 3.1/km^{2} (7.9/sq mi)
- Time zone: UTC+1 (CET)
  - Summer (DST): UTC+2 (CEST)
- Website: Official website

Villamediana is a municipality located in the province of Palencia, Castile and León, Spain. According to the 2004 census (INE), the municipality had a population of 229 inhabitants.

In Spanish history a prominent role was played by Juan de Tassis, 1st Count of Villamediana and his son Juan de Tassis, 2nd Count of Villamediana.
