= Somerset House Conference (painting) =

17th-century painting

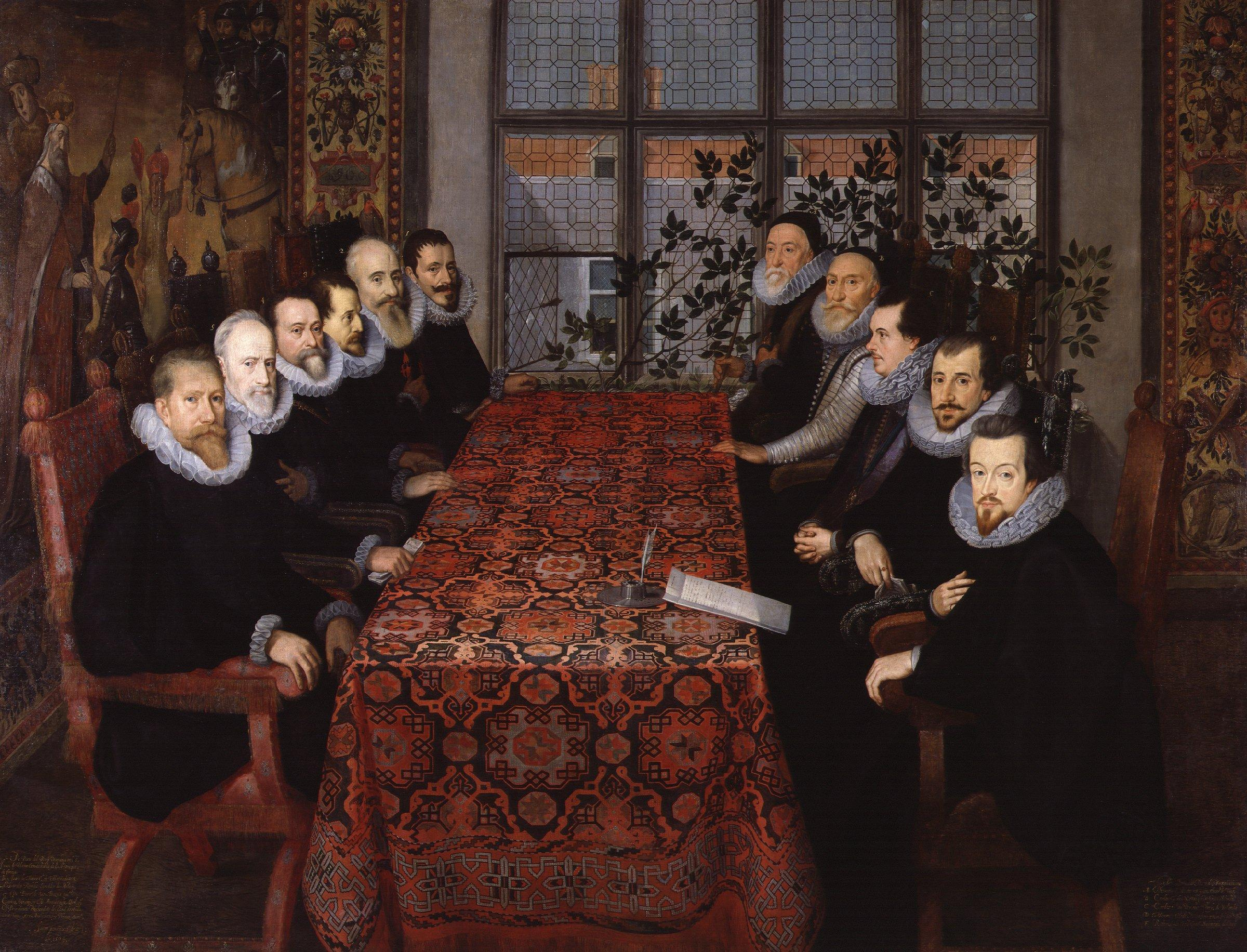
The Somerset House Conference, 1604, National Portrait Gallery. Delegates from Spain and the Spanish Netherlands on the left, the English on the right.

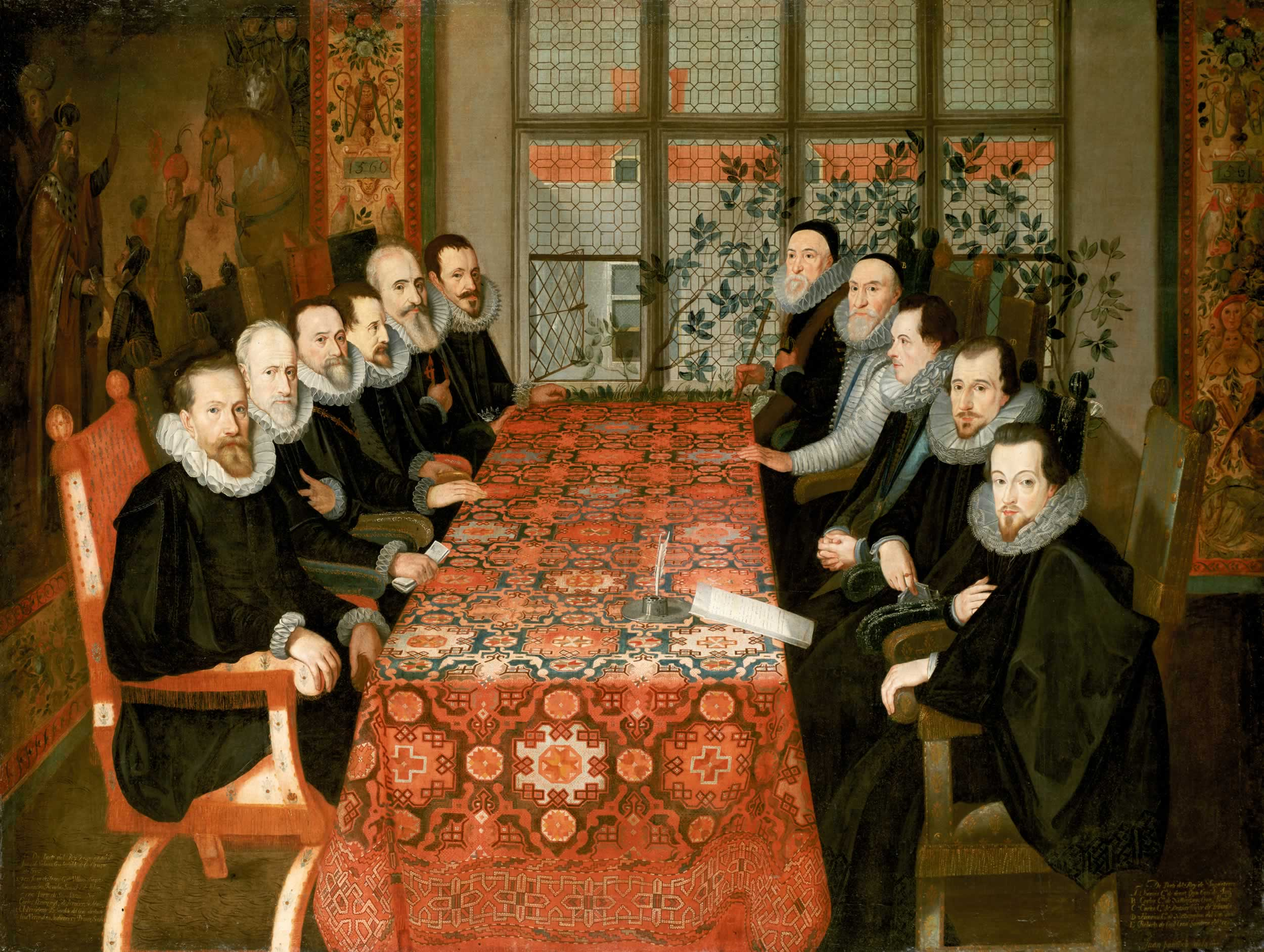
The Somerset House Conference, 1604, National Maritime Museum

The Somerset House Conference, 1604 is an oil-on-canvas painting, in two versions, depicting the Somerset House Conference held in 1604 to negotiate the end the Anglo-Spanish War. The compositions are effectively identical: a group portrait, depicting the 11 representatives of the governments of England, Spain and the Spanish Netherlands, seated around a conference table, probably in old Somerset House.

One version, thought to be the prime version, is in the National Portrait Gallery, London ("NPG"), and another in the National Maritime Museum, Greenwich. They were probably by the same workshop, with one version perhaps intended to be sent to Spain as a diplomatic gift.

Both versions bear a signature of the leading Spanish court painter Juan Pantoja de la Cruz and the NPG version a date of 1594, which is impossible. It is generally thought that both signature and the date are false and that the versions are by a hitherto unidentified Flemish artist, or his studio, a view both museums now think likely. The Netherlandish portraitist working in London, John De Critz the Elder, or his workshop, has been suggested.

== Background ==
Queen Elizabeth I died in 1603, and her successor James I quickly sought to end the 18 years of conflict. Philip III of Spain had also inherited the war from his predecessor Philip II. Both new kings were happy to end the expensive and distracting conflict.

The conference was held in 18 sessions between 20 May and 16 July 1604. The treaty was signed on 16 August, and restored the status quo ante bellum. Spain was compelled to recognise the Protestant monarchy in England, and England ended its financial and military support for the Dutch rebellion since the Treaty of Nonsuch in 1585. Following the signing of the treaty, England and Spain remained at peace until 1625.

James gave the Spanish delegates generous gifts, including the Royal Gold Cup which was given to the leader of the Spanish delegation, Juan Fernández de Velasco, 5th Duke of Frías. The following year Charles Howard, 1st Earl of Nottingham led an English delegation to ratify the treaty in Valladolid, the capital of Spain from 1601-1606.

== Painting ==
Both paintings are signed by the Spanish painter Juan Pantoja de la Cruz and the NPG version has the date 1594 inscribed in a corner. While the date is clearly not accurate, the signature is open to discussion. Some art historians have considered the style closer to Flemish than to Spanish practice. John de Critz, Frans Pourbous or Marcus Gheeraerts the Younger have been proposed, though Pantoja de la Cruz has had his advocates and remains as the most probable author. The room depicted is likely to be an interior in Old Somerset House (rebuilt from 1775).

The work includes portraits of the 11 government representatives, each seated in an elaborate chair of estate to either side of a long rectangular table covered by a fine oriental carpet of the so-called Holbein carpet type, a common object of luxury to display in Jacobean portraiture. In front of Robert Cecil are a pewter ink-pot, a quill and a piece of paper. A leaded window behind the sitters reveals a courtyard with shrubs and there are rushes on the floor. The tapestries on the walls to either side bear the date 1560 and 1561. The scene depicted on the left hand side tapestry may be an imaginary scene where King Solomon commands Philip II to fight the Ottomans, a reference to Philip's Christian league that started in 1560 with the defeat of the Christian allies at the Battle of Djerba but would continue until victory was achieved in the Battle of Lepanto. This would reinforce the idea that the painting was commissioned and painted in Spain and that the whole composition is not an accurate depiction of the meeting but a biased and idealized representation of the meeting seen from a Spanish perspective.

The Spanish ambassadors were lodged at Somerset House, and the painting may represent the Council Chamber in the east of wing of its main quadrangle, the view from window conforming with plans of the demolished palace.

Depicted on the right side of the table are the five English delegates representing James I; in order of precedence, from the window:

- Thomas Sackville, 1st Earl of Dorset (1536-1608), Poet and Lord Treasurer, who led the English delegation
- Charles Howard, 1st Earl of Nottingham (1536-1624), Lord High Admiral and Lord Steward
- Charles Blount, 1st Earl of Devonshire (1563-1606), Master-General of the Ordnance
- Henry Howard, 1st Earl of Northampton (1540-1614), Lord Warden of the Cinque Ports
- Robert Cecil, Viscount Cranborne, later 1st Earl of Salisbury (1563-1612), Secretary of State, James I's leading minister

On the left is the delegation from Spain representing Philip III; in order from the window:

- Juan Fernández de Velasco y Tovar, 5th Duke of Frías, Constable of Castile, leader of the Austro/Flemish and Spanish delegation (who attended the signing of the treaty in August)
- Juan de Tassis, 1st Count of Villamediana
- Alessandro Robida, Senator of Milan

And then the delegation from the Spanish Netherlands representing Albert VII, Archduke of Austria:

- Charles de Ligne, 2nd Prince of Arenberg
- Jean Richardot, President of the Brussels Privy Council
- Louis Verreyken, Audiencier of Brussels and Principal Secretary

== Authorship ==
Gustav Ungerer has studied the interchanges of portraits, jewellery and other gifts during the negotiations and celebrations which surrounded the Treaty of London, a peace treaty signed with Spain in August 1604 during the conference at Somerset House, when diplomatic exchanges of miniatures and full-length portraits took place in a sustained show of brilliant self-representation. Ungerer discusses the contested signature and defends the authorship of Juan Pantoja de la Cruz, arguing that Pantoja may have visited London with the Spanish delegation.

Both versions of the painting, at the National Portrait Gallery and National Maritime Museum, Greenwich, are signed by the Spanish court painter Juan Pantoja de la Cruz. However scholars disagree about whether he was the artist since, although the signatures appear authentic, he was never in London. It is possible that either the works are by a Flemish artist, possibly Frans Pourbus, or John De Critz, or were copied by Pantoja from a Flemish artist who was in London at the time. Pantoja may have worked up the likenesses of the English negotiators by "copying the faces of the delegates either from miniatures or from standard portraits given to him or to the constable in London or sent to Valladolid...He obviously used a Cecil portrait as model for The Somerset House Conference which was Cecil's standard type of portrait attributed to John de Critz". It is certainly on record that the leader of the English negotiating team, Sir Robert Cecil, gave the leader of the Spanish negotiators, Juan Fernández de Velasco, 5th Duke of Frías and Constable of Castile, his stock portrait as duplicated in the workshop of John de Critz. Pantoja's depiction of Charles Howard, earl of Nottingham, also looks as if it has been duplicated from a standard portrait. Apart from the heads, the picture shows signs of workshop painting by assistants, perhaps revealing that numerous versions were produced, as there would have been many demands from those involved for duplicates of the painting, for purposes of historical record. The painting sheds light on the piecemeal process of constructing group portraits at this time.
