= Treaty of London (1604) =

1604 peace treaty between England and Spain

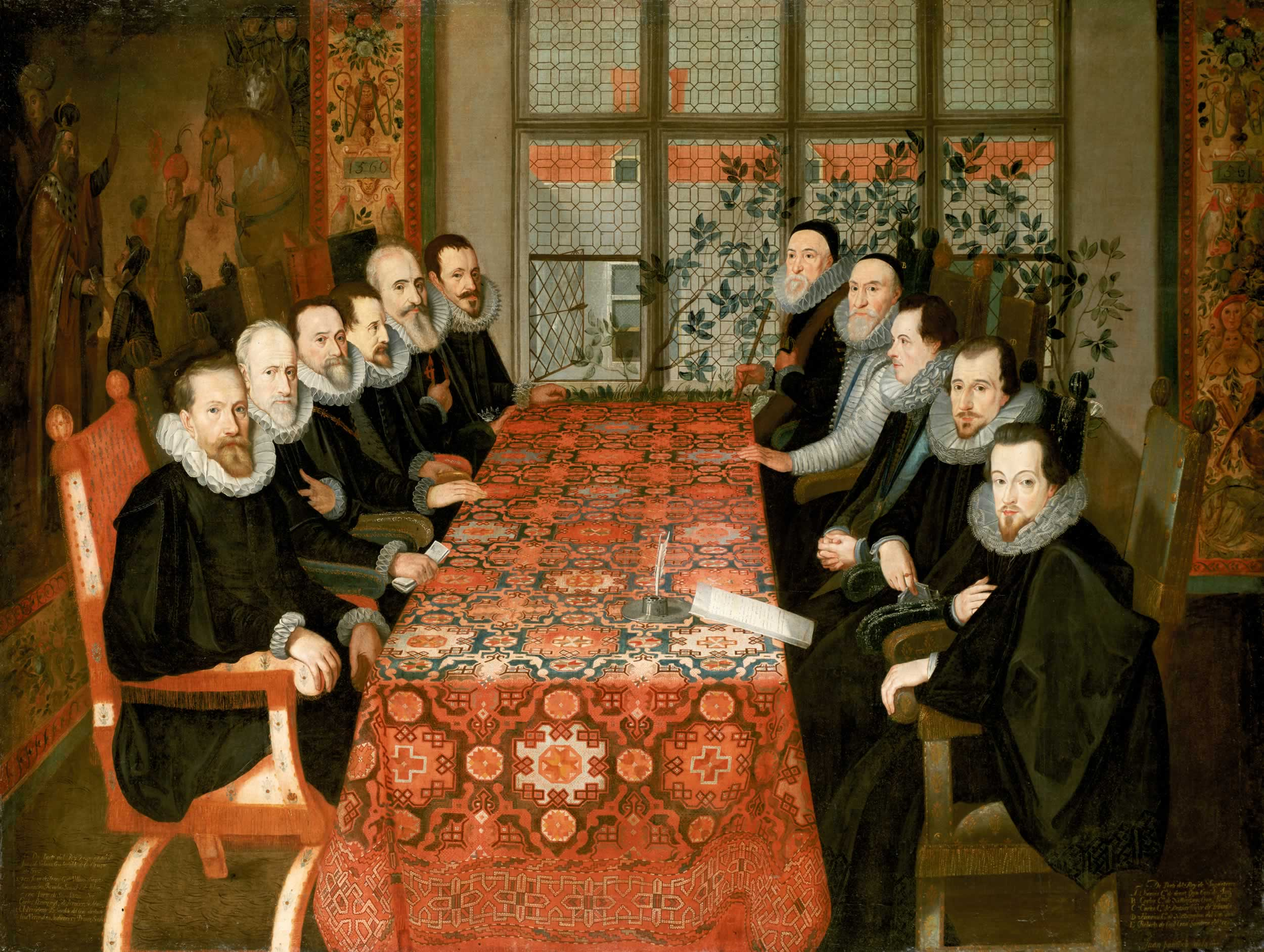
- The Somerset House Conference, 19 August 1604, unknown artist
- Signed: 28 August 1604
- Location: London, England
- Languages: English, Spanish, Latin

The Treaty of London (Spanish: Tratado de Londres), signed on 18 August O.S. (28 August N.S.) 1604, concluded the nineteen-year Anglo-Spanish War soon after the death of the childless Elizabeth I of England and the accession of James VI of Scotland to the throne of England in 1603 as James I. The treaty restored the status quo between the two nations prior to the war. The negotiations probably took place at Somerset House in Westminster and are sometimes known as the Somerset House Conference.

== Background ==
The Anglo-Spanish War, starting in 1585 had been complex and fluctuating conflict that also had connections with the Dutch Revolt, the French Wars of Religion, and the Nine Years' War in Ireland. By 1598, neither side had secured a decisive advantage; however, a series of events would pave the way for peace. France, England and the Dutch Republic had signed an alliance two years previous in their fight against Spain. France however went behind the backs of England and the Dutch and ended their war with Spain with the Peace of Vervins which was signed in 1598. As a result, England and the Dutch Republic signed the Treaty of Westminster later that year, renewing the military alliance. The treaty however reduced England's military commitment in the Low Countries as the Dutch states were in a much stronger position than it had been in 1585. Since then and with English help, the Dutch had reconquered, as well as captured, large swatches of territory from the Spanish. The Dutch also consented that there would be no restraint if England made a separate peace with Spain provided there was reduced instalments of Dutch debt to England.

For Spain, change was also in the air; the war by 1596 had taken a downturn. The defeat at Cadiz, and the failure of their 2nd armada had sent the nation into bankruptcy. The 3rd Spanish armada sent the following year was also a costly disaster, which affected the health of King Philip II and from which he never recovered. On September 1598, his death brought a significant change. The new young King Phillip III carried on the war, but his court was now dominated by the Duke of Lerma whose general policy was one of disengagement. In 1599, the Spanish Empire suffered further financial strain. As such, there was rebellious opposition for the King's request for money, which saw Spanish troops mutiny in the Netherlands. In addition, there was the fear of a new war with France over the Duchy of Saluzzo. All of these combined to emphasise the hopelessness of inflicting a vital blow on England.

=== Early peace proposals ===
In April 1600, Archduke Albert, the governor of the Spanish Netherlands, opened secret negotiations with England for a settlement but did not inform Madrid. The following month, negotiations culminated in a meeting of a conference at Bourbourg between representatives of Spain, England and Burgundy.

Bourbourg was chosen as it was a personal possession of the Kings of France from 1562 despite being under the sovereignty of Spain. This continued until 1659 when the town was reincorporated into the French kingdom.

Spain demanded the cession of the Cautionary Towns. England demanded free trade with Spain and her empire, freedom of English subjects from the inquisition and the exclusive right of having warships in the channel. The talks got nowhere, Spain contended that it was absurd to expect the sovereign of a worldwide empire to give the pas to a queen of a few islands. By August the talks were off – mutual distrust and United Provinces pressure made any agreement impossible. Despite this however diplomatic routes were open between England, Albert, and his wife, Isabella Clara Eugenia (Philip's sister). Letters from representatives showed that Albert, Isabella Clara Eugenia, and Philip were still anxious for peace despite their difference in policies. Philip wanted to preserve the hegemony of the Spanish empire, whilst the Archduke and Isabella sought peace and friendly relations.

The concern of the government in Madrid was to improve their dire military situation in the Netherlands by reducing or stopping English help to the Dutch rebels. Meanwhile, Johan van Oldenbarnevelt, heading the delegation of the States of Holland, tried to attract the complicity of the new English monarch in the conflict in Flanders, of which the focus was the Siege of Ostend. The siege had become a struggle of bloody attrition after just over two years. Spain had also sent their 4th Spanish Armada in 1601 this time to Ireland in the hope of assisting the Irish rebels, who were fighting to rid England's rule. The town of Kinsale was held, and besieged by English forces led by the Earl of Mountjoy. The expedition ended in defeat when Kinsale surrendered in 1602. The defeat thus further weakened Spanish resolve in the war against England.

After the death of Queen Elizabeth I in 1603, her successor, James I, quickly sought to end the long and draining conflict. By this time Spanish hopes of a decisive military victory in the Netherlands, or a successful invasion of England, were relatively remote. James, an idealistic Protestant practitioner of Christian peace and unity, was the son and successor to the Catholic Mary, Queen of Scots, whose execution had been a proximate cause of the conflict. Philip III warmly welcomed the offer and ordered the commencement of the difficult negotiations that followed.

== Treaty ==
The first moves towards a treaty were taken in June 1603, when Juan de Tassis headed a Spanish–Flemish Commission which visited London, seeking truces and mutual good faith. Tassis was despatched to England by Philip III to explore the possibilities for a settlement following Elizabeth's death.

Archduke Albert had already sent his envoy Charles de Ligne, prince-count of Arenberg, to London and was joined by Juan de Tassis, in September 1603. Although De Tassis lacked full negotiating powers he was active behind the scene the following month in preparation for a settlement.

At the end of 1603, the constable of Castile arrived in Brussels with the authorisation to conclude the treaty if one could be negotiated. On 19 May 1604, with the constable still waiting in the wings, the rest of the Habsburg delegation arrived in London and the English negotiating team was appointed. The meetings took place in Somerset House, probably in the hall used by the Queen's council.

=== English delegation ===
- Robert Cecil, 1st Earl of Salisbury (1563–1612), Secretary of State, James I's leading minister
- Charles Blount, 1st Earl of Devonshire (1563–1606), soldier
- Thomas Sackville, 1st Earl of Dorset (1536–1608), Lord Treasurer
- Henry Howard, 1st Earl of Northampton (1540–1614), Lord Warden of the Cinque Ports.
- Charles Howard, 1st Earl of Nottingham (1536–1624), Lord High Admiral

=== Spanish delegations ===
The Spanish negotiated with two delegations, one representing the King of Spain, the other the Archdukes Albert and Isabella, rulers of the Spanish Netherlands.

Spanish delegation:

- Juan Fernández de Velasco y Tovar, 5th Duke of Frías, Constable of Castile
- Juan de Tassis, 1st Count of Villamediana
- Alessandro Robida, Senator of Milan, leading negotiator in London in the absence of the Constable of Castile.

Delegation of the Spanish Netherlands:

- Charles de Ligne, 2nd Prince of Arenberg
- Jean Richardot, President of the Brussels Privy Council
- Louis Verreyken, Audiencier of Brussels

=== Terms ===
- Spain recognizes the Protestant monarchy of England and renounces intentions to restore the Church of Rome in the country.
- An end to Spanish military intervention in Ireland.
- An end to English disruption to Spanish trans-Atlantic shipping and colonial expansion (article 6).
- The English Channel opened to Spanish shipping.
- An end to English intervention in the Dutch Revolt (articles 4,5,7); England withdraws military and financial support to the Dutch rebels.
- Ships of both countries, merchants or warships, could use the mainland seaports of the other party for refit, shelter or buy provisions (article 10). Fleets of less than eight ships did not even have to ask for permission, which provided an extensive network of naval bases for the Spaniards in England to help their war against the Protestant Dutch.

The treaty was signed on 28 August (New Style), at Whitehall Palace, by the Constable of Castile who was lodged at Somerset House. The treaty restored the status quo ante bellum. It amounted to an acknowledgement by Spain that its hopes of restoring Roman Catholicism in England were at an end and it had to recognise the Protestant monarchy in England. In return, England ended its financial and military support for the Dutch rebellion, ongoing since the Treaty of Nonsuch (1585), and had to end its wartime disruption of Spanish trans-Atlantic shipping and colonial expansion.

== Aftermath ==
With England out of the way, the Spanish hoped for a knock-out blow that would force the Dutch into a peace by launching a huge campaign led by Ambrogio Spinola in 1606. James still allowed the Dutch army to recruit English volunteer soldiers in their service – 8,000 having served in the Netherlands in 1605. In addition, English corsairs were now finding their needs in the service of the Dutch, who preyed on Spanish shipping. Conversely, Spanish warships and privateers were allowed to use English ports as naval bases to attack Dutch shipping or to transport reinforcements to Flanders. In November 1607, the costs of the recent wars with France, the Protestant Dutch as well as England resulted in Spain's bankruptcy. The Twelve Years' Truce was thus signed, which formally recognized the independence of the Dutch Republic.

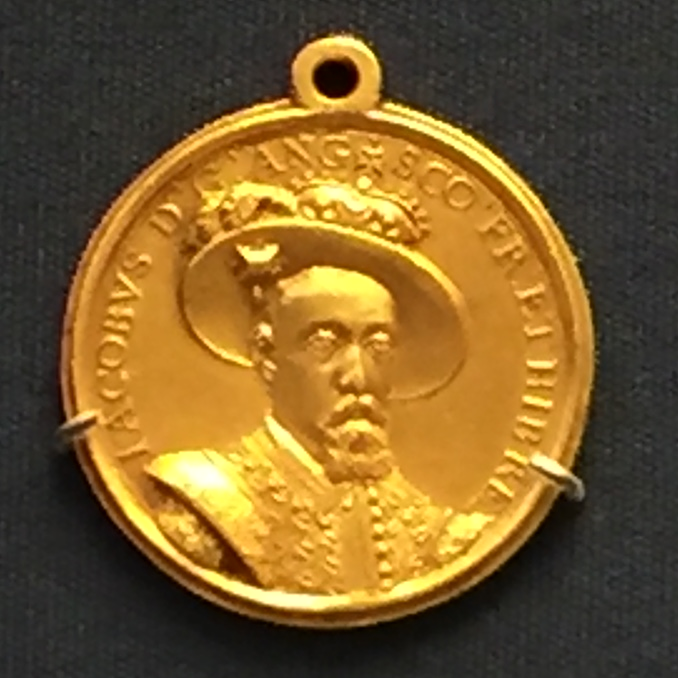
Gold medal minted in England in 1604 to commemorate the peace signed with Spain.

To the English public, the treaty was highly unpopular, viewing it as a "humiliating peace". They felt that the King had deserted their ally the Netherlands in order to appease the Spanish, and it made James I "monumentally unpopular". Noel Caron, ambassador of the United Provinces to London, wrote that "no promulgation was ever received in London with more coolness, yes—with more sadness." As such no public celebrations were held in England after the conclusion of the agreement. The rift between James I's foreign policy and public opinion would widen some years later as a result of the "Spanish match", when the Protestant House of Commons would confront the King over his marriage arrangement between Maria Anna of Spain (the daughter of Philip III of Spain) and James's son, Charles, the Prince of Wales. The English delegation, however, considered the treaty with Spain a diplomatic victory which gave the English "peace with honour". After the signing lavish celebrations organised by the 3rd Earl of Southampton including a grand feast and ball were laid on at the Palace of Whitehall. Gold and silver medals designed by Nicholas Hilliard were also struck to commemorate the peace.

The peace agreement was well received in Spain. There were big public celebrations in the Spanish capital Valladolid from April to June 1605 in honour of the treaty and of the birth of Philip's son Philip IV of Spain. Also present were the English ambassadorial delegation (which numbered 500) led by Lord Admiral Charles Howard. He had been sent by James I in return for Don Juan de Velasco having been sent to England to negotiate the peace the previous year. The English delegation were welcomed with a warm reception and honours on 26 May which included Howard being received at the English college. The treaty was then ratified in the Royal Palace of Valladolid in the presence of Howard the following month. Some voices from the Catholic Church, however, expressed its concern to Philip III over his settlement with a "heretical power", especially Juan de Ribera, then bishop of Valencia who protested. Once the agreement was concluded, Philip III appointed Don Pedro de Zuñiga as first Spanish resident ambassador to England.

For the Spanish crown, there was hope after the peace treaty that England would eventually secure tolerance for Catholics. The Gunpowder Plot in 1605, however, destroyed any possibility of this. Protestant fears that a peace with Spain would ultimately mean an invasion by Jesuits and Catholic sympathisers over the coming years also failed to materialise as the Elizabethan Recusancy laws were rigidly enforced by Parliament.

Following the signing of the treaty, England and Spain remained at peace until 1625.

== See also ==
- List of treaties

== Sources ==
- Brown, Jonathan; Elliott, John Huxtable; Museo del Prado (2002). The Sale of the Century: Artistic Relations Between Spain and Great Britain, 1604-1655. Yale University Press. ISBN 9780300097610.
- Davenport, Frances Gardiner; and Paullin, Charles Oscar. European Treaties Bearing on the History of the United States and Its Dependencies, The Lawbook Exchange, Ltd., 2004 ISBN 1-58477-422-3, ISBN 978-1-58477-422-8
- Dunthorne, Hugh (2013). Britain and the Dutch Revolt, 1560-1700. Cambridge University Press. ISBN 9780521837477.
- Fissel, Mark Charles (2001). English warfare, 1511–1642; Warfare and history. London, UK: Routledge. ISBN 978-0-415-21481-0.
- Hammer, Paul E J (2003). Elizabeth's Wars: War, Government and Society in Tudor England, 1544-1604. Palgrave Macmillan. ISBN 9781137173386.
- Hammer, Paul E. J. (1999). The Polarisation of Elizabethan Politics: The Political Career of Robert Devereux, 2nd Earl of Essex, 1585–1597. Cambridge University Press. ISBN 9780521434850.
- Hillgarth, J N (2000). The Mirror of Spain, 1500-1700: The Formation of a Myth. University of Michigan Press. ISBN 9780472110926.
- MacCaffrey, Wallace T (1994). Elizabeth I: War and Politics, 1588–1603. Princeton Paperbacks Princeton University Press. ISBN 9780691036519.
- Maltby, William S (2008). The Rise and Fall of the Spanish Empire. Palgrave Macmillan. ISBN 9781137041876.
- McCoog, Thomas M (2012). The Society of Jesus in Ireland, Scotland, and England, 1589-1597: Building the Faith of Saint Peter Upon the King of Spain's Monarchy. Ashgate & Institutum Historicum Societatis Iesu. ISBN 978-1-4094-3772-7.
- O'Connor, Thomas (2016). Irish Voices from the Spanish Inquisition Migrants, Converts and Brokers in Early Modern Iberia. Palgrave Macmillan UK. ISBN 9781137465900.
- Rowse, A. L (1973). The Expansion of Elizabethan England. Cardinal Books. ISBN 978-0351180644.
