= Cautionary Towns =

Three towns in the Dutch Republic

The Cautionary Towns were three strategic Dutch towns which, under the 1585 Treaty of Nonsuch, were held by English troops as security for assistance provided by Elizabeth I during the Eighty Years' War against Spain. They were Brill (Brielle) in Holland and Flushing (Vlissingen) and Fort Rammekens on the nearby island of Walcheren. The bases were returned to the Dutch Republic in 1616.

== Background ==
The Cautionary Towns

English and Scottish volunteers serving with the Dutch Protestants against Spain helped capture Brill, Rammekens and Flushing in 1572 and garrisoned them soon after. When the Anglo-Spanish War began in 1585, it was important to keep these strategic ports out of Spanish hands.

In the Treaty of Nonsuch, the Dutch effectively ceded control of the three towns to Elizabeth I as security for her assistance and it was agreed that England would garrison them at its own expense. Elizabeth's favourite, Robert Dudley, 1st Earl of Leicester was made governor of Flushing in 1588, with Thomas Cecil, 1st Earl of Exeter, appointed governor of Brill; he was succeeded by Sir Edward Conway who named his daughter Brilliana in honour of the town.

When the 1604 Treaty of London ended the Anglo-Spanish War, the Spanish demanded the Cautionary Towns be returned to them but the English refused. Philip III of Spain eventually conceded the point, having decided their neutrality permitted him to gain access to the English Channel. This presented a threat to the Dutch and when it became apparent the 1609 Twelve Years' Truce would not be renewed, they sought to recover the towns; with James I unwilling to recall Parliament and thus short of funds, the Dutch ambassador was authorised to offer up to £250,000 for their purchase. In May 1616, they agreed a price of £213,000.

During the Third Anglo-Dutch War in 1672, when a combined attack by Charles II of England and Louis XIV of France brought the Dutch close to defeat, Charles demanded the permanent cession of Brill, Flushing and Sluys to England. However, the Dutch rejected these terms and their position soon recovered.

== Sources ==
- Croft, Pauline (2002). King James. Palgrave Macmillan. ISBN 978-1403990174.
- Harris, William (1814). An historical and critical account of the lives and writings of James I. and Charles I. and of the lives of Oliver Cromwell and Charles II. F.C. and J. Rivington.
- Jackson, Clare (2021). Devil Land; England under Siege 1588-1688. Allen Lane. ISBN 978-0241285817.
- Knight, Charles Raleigh (1905). Historical records of The Buffs, East Kent Regiment (3rd Foot) formerly designated the Holland Regiment and Prince George of Denmark's Regiment Vol I. Gale & Polden.
- Malland, David (1980). Europe at War 1600-1650. Rowman and Littlefield. ISBN 978-0847662135.
- Mattingly, Garrett (1959). The Armada. Houghton Mifflin.
- Troost, Wouter (2005). William III the Stadholder-king: A Political Biography. Routledge. ISBN 978-0754650713.
- Wernham, R.B (1969). Before the Armada: The growth of English foreign policy 1485–1588. Cape.
