= Capture of Axel =

1586 siege

- Part of the Eighty Years' War & the Anglo-Spanish War (1585–1604)
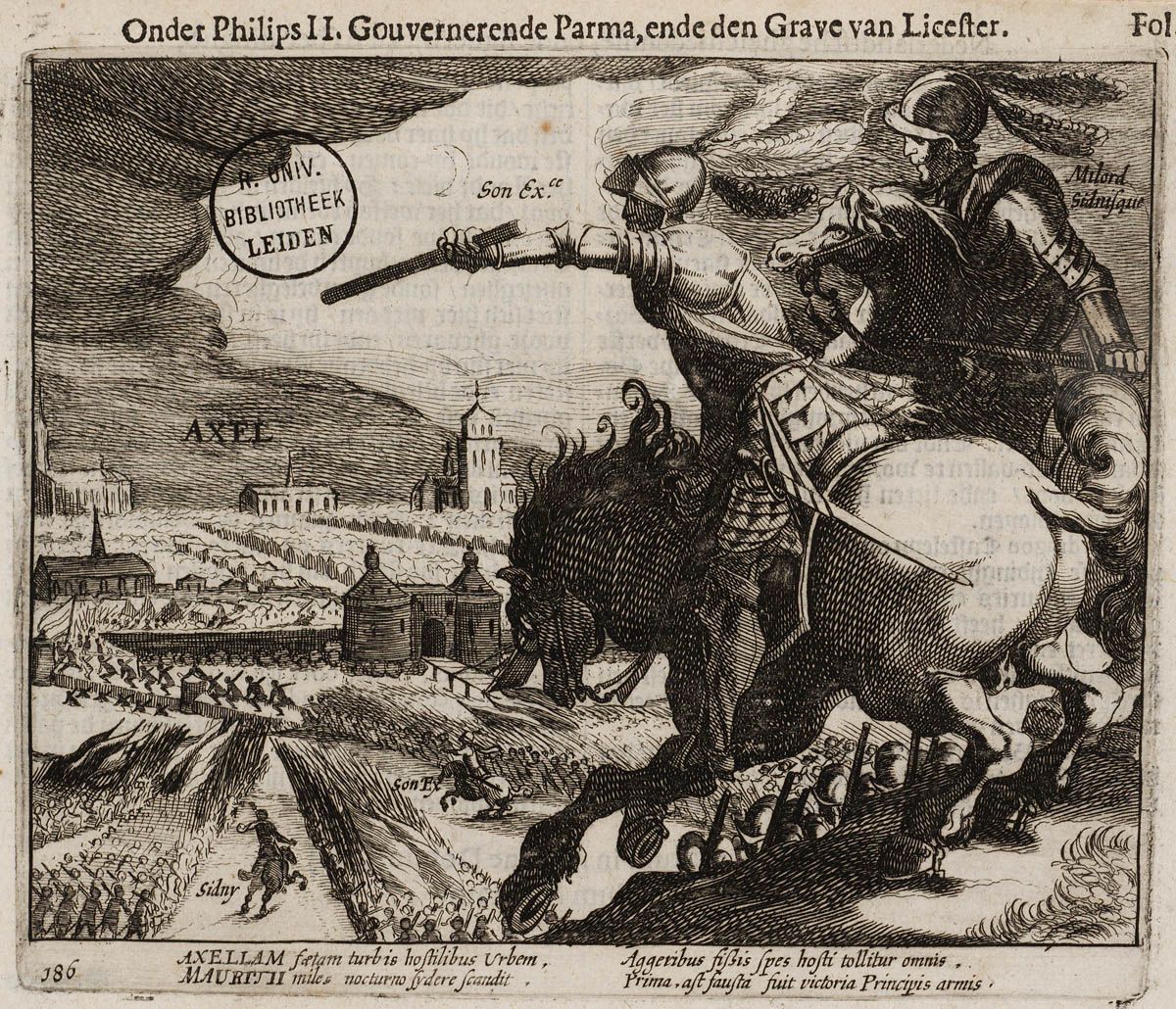
- Siege of Axel 1586
Date	July 17, 1586
Location	Axel, Zeeland (Present day Netherlands) 51°15′56″N 3°54′32″E
Result	Dutch and English victory

Belligerents
(Dutch Republic) States-General; England	Spain

Commanders and leaders
(Dutch Republic) Maurice of Nassau (England) Philip Sidney	(Spain) Unknown

Strength
2,000	600

Casualties and losses
30 wounded	All killed, wounded, or captured

The Capture of Axel was a military event during the Dutch Revolt and the Anglo-Spanish War (1585–1604) in which the town of Axel, defended by the Spanish, was captured by an Anglo-Dutch force led by Sir Philip Sidney, with the garrison being put to the sword. It was also the first feat of Maurice of Nassau.

Maurice of Nassau was appointed stadtholder of Holland and Zeeland on his eighteenth birthday in 1585 and in the following year he began leading the fight.

Axel, a town in the County of Zeeland, was an important fortified city on the southwestern edge of the Scheldt estuary and had been in the hands of the Spaniards since 1583 when Alexander Farnese, the later Duke of Parma, had captured the place. The acquisition would make the Dutch and English holdings in the area such as Ostend and Sluys more secure and a reasonable base from which to launch attacks.

== Assault and capture ==
On June 17, 1586, with the assistance of the newly arrived English forces under the Earl of Leicester and Sir Philip Sydney, the stage was set for the capture of the town.

Here they joined with Maurice's men of Zeelanders and marched towards Axel and on arrival began to besiege it. Maurice had opened the dykes which then flooded the towns around Terneuzen to cut off Axel from the mainland. This was also used to discourage any assistance in terms of relief and supply.

Almost immediately an assault was launched but the leading assault troops of forty men under Colonel Jan Pyrom found the surrounding moat very deep. Undeterred they swam across it and with the ladders brought up, scaled the ramparts killing the guard. Once inside they opened the gates for the rest of the besiegers to assault the place. The Dutch companies were first to rush in then followed by the English under Sydney and then Willoughby with the final wave. The Spanish garrison recovered from their surprise but numbers were against them and soon the whole garrison, despite gallant resistance, was slaughtered, with very few being taken prisoner.

After the siege Maurice had several redoubts built to protect Axel and the surrounding area. Axel itself was then garrisoned by over 800 soldiers under Colonel Pyron who was rewarded for his services in the action. He then set about dismantling the Catholic magistrates and clearing the city of its inhabitants.

Maurice as commander was to make great achievements later on in the States' campaigns. Sydney would later be mortally wounded in the siege of Zutphen a year later and Leicester would leave soon after, following poor relations with the Dutch and fellow English officers.
