= Manuel Castellano (painter) =

Spanish painter

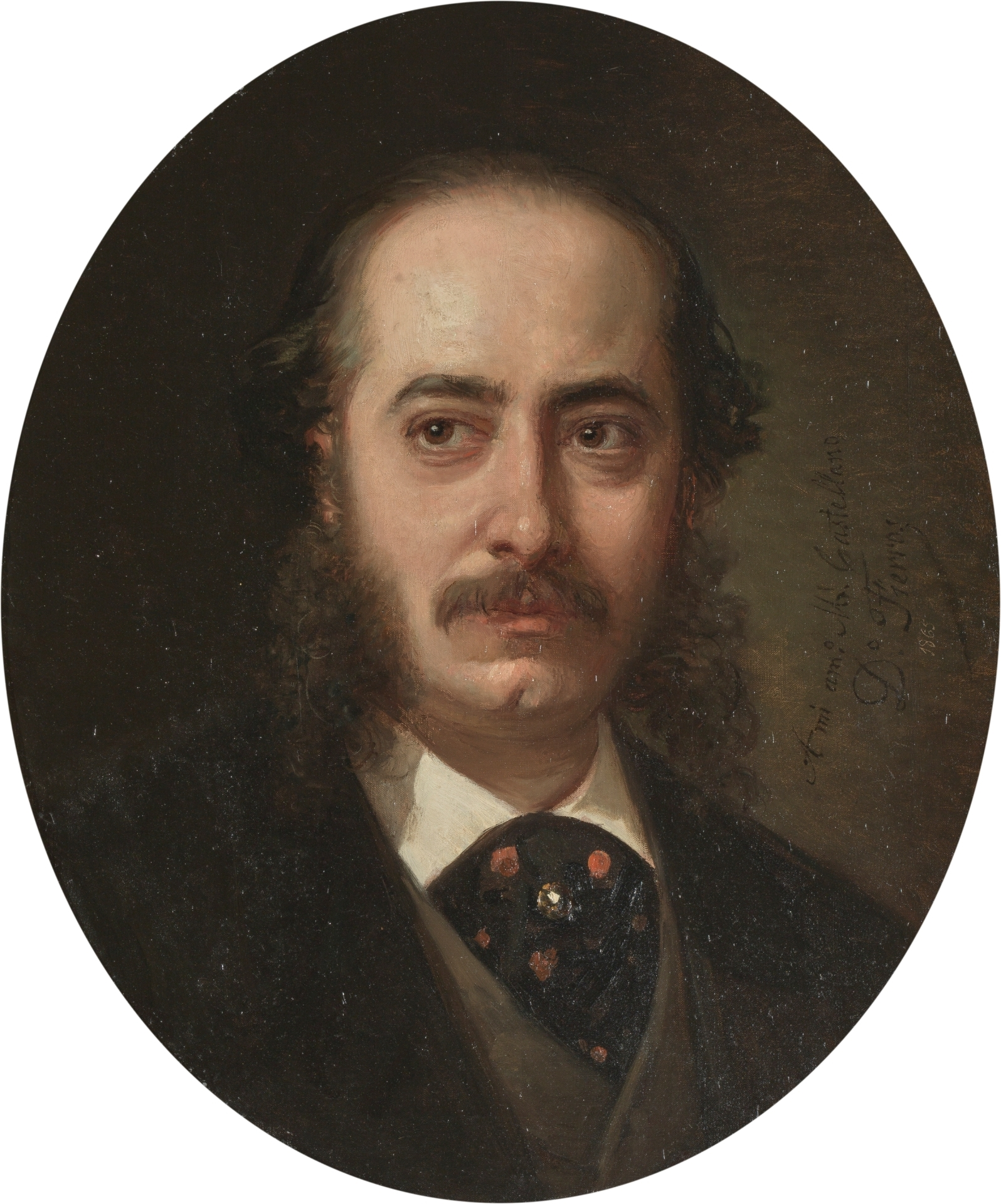
Manuel Castellano; portrait by Dionisio Fierros (1865)

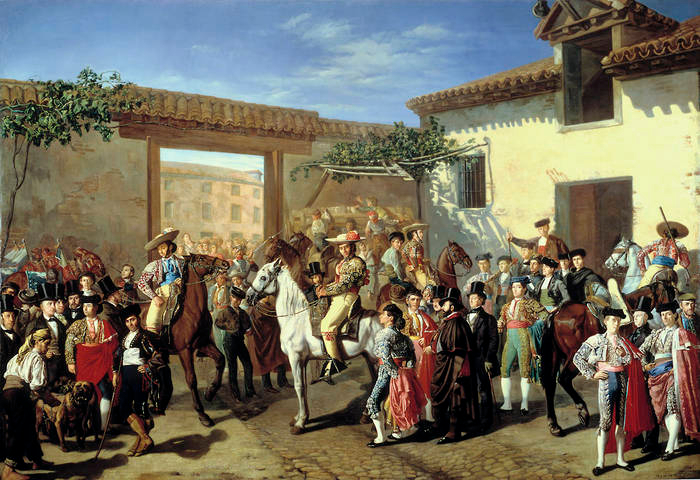
"Patio de Caballos" at the old Plaza de Toros in Madrid

Manuel Rodríguez de la Parra Castellano (3 February 1823/1826 – 3 April 1880) was a Spanish costumbrista painter and engraver in the Romantic style, known especially for his bullfight scenes. He was also a noted art collector.

== Biography ==
He was born in Madrid, where he began his art studies at the Academia de Bellas Artes de San Fernando in Madrid and later worked with Carlos Luis Ribera to decorate the ceiling of the meeting room for the Congress of Deputies.

In 1856, he won honorable mention at the first National Exhibition of Fine Arts for his painting of the picadors preparing their horses at the old bullring in Madrid (demolished in 1874), which incorporates portraits of many of the period's most popular bullfighters, including Paquiro.

In 1862, he won third prize at the Exhibition with his depiction of the deaths of Luis Daoíz and Pedro Velarde; again in 1866 for Fernando Valenzuela in prison, and a third time in 1868 for the death of the Conde de Villamediana. In 1875, aged almost fifty, he was awarded a stipend to study in Rome and Venice. He also studied briefly in Paris.

As a collector, he acquired one of the first collections of photographs in Spain. He amassed more than 20,000 of them, from 1853 until his death in Madrid, primarily portraits and scenic vistas, most of which were arranged in albums. After his death, they passed into the collection of the Biblioteca Nacional. His nephew sold over 6,000 engravings from his uncle's collection to the museum.
