= Juan de Tassis, 2nd Count of Villamediana =

Spanish poet (1582–1622)

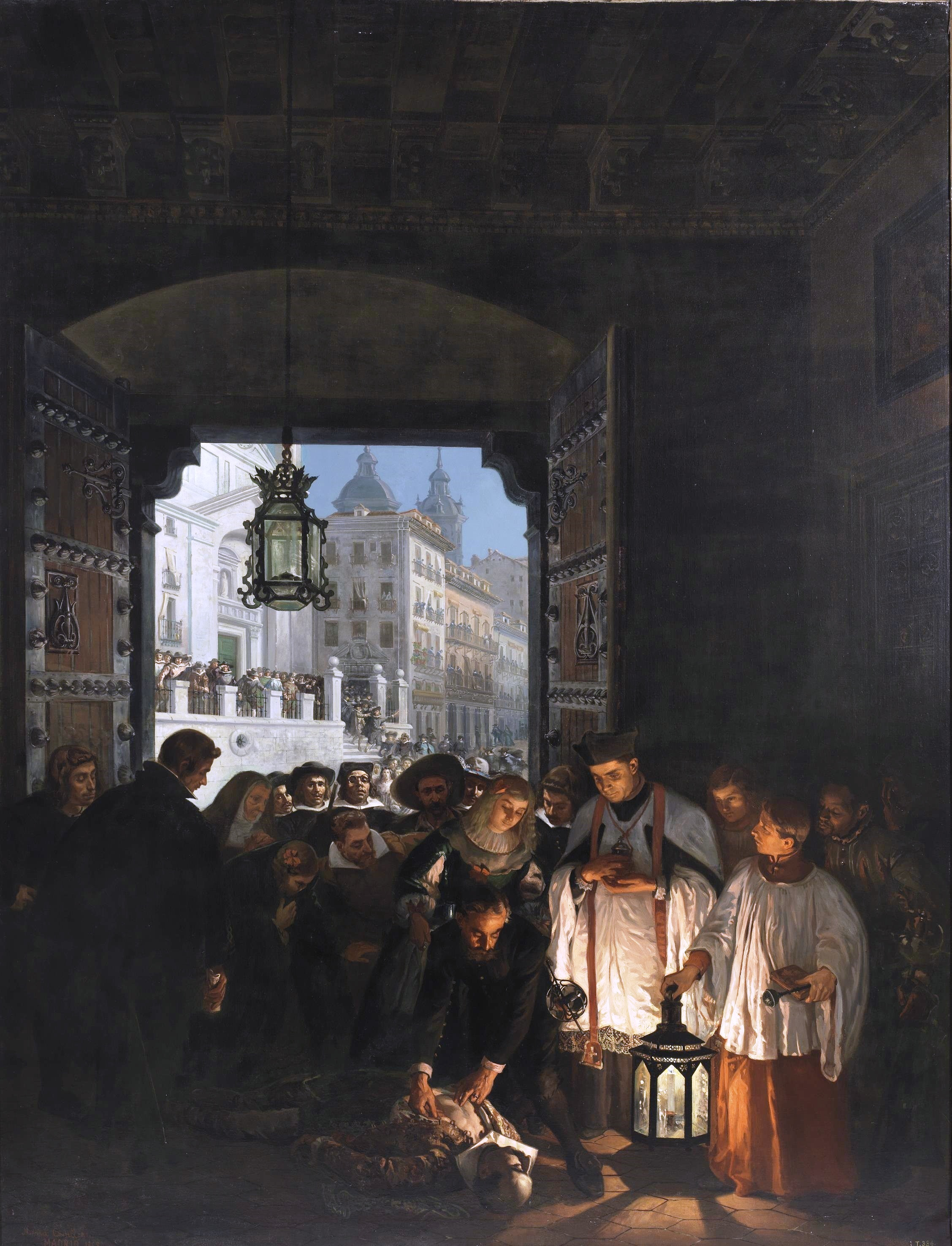
The Death of the Count of Villamediana, Manuel Castellano, 1868

Don Juan de Tassis y Peralta, 2nd Count of Villamediana (Spanish: Don Juan de Tassis y Peralta, segundo conde de Villamediana; baptised 26 August 1582 – 21 August 1622) was a Spanish poet of the Baroque Culteranismo school. In Spain he is simply known as Conde de Villamediana.

== Life ==
Villamediana was born at Lisbon in late 1581 or early 1582. His father, Juan de Tassis y Acuña, 1st Count of Villamediana, upon whom the title of count was conferred by King Philip III of Spain in 1603, was a diplomat heading the Spanish legation who signed the Treaty of London, May 1604.

On leaving Salamanca he married in 1601, and succeeded to the title on the death of his father in 1607; he was prominent in the life of the capital, was forbidden to attend court, and resided in Italy from 1611 to 1617.

On Villamediana's return to Spain, he was soon noted as a satirist. Prominent men such as the Duke of Lerma, Rodrigo Calderón, Count of Oliva and Jorge de Tobar were frequent targets. Villamediana was once more ordered to withdraw from court in 1618. He returned on the death of Philip III and was appointed gentleman-in-waiting to Philip IV's young wife, Elisabeth of France, daughter of Henri IV.

According to legend, a fire broke out while Villamediana's masque, La gloria de Niquea, was being acted before the court on 14 May 1622, and he carried the queen to a place of safety. Suspicion deepened; Villamediana neglected a significant warning that his life was in peril, and "he was murdered as he stepped out of his coach. The responsibility for his death was divided between Philip IV and Olivares (the King's chief minister and favourite)". In 1928, Narciso Alonso Cortés claimed to have discovered documents in Simancas that implicated Villamediana in a trial on sodomy which concluded with the burning of five young men on 5 December 1622. Some consider that his murder was the result of this trial; others attribute it to his satires or to dangerous liaisons. Villamediana was also the subject of homophobic innuendo in a satirical poem by Francisco de Quevedo.

Villamediana's works, first published at Zaragoza in 1629, contain both his satirical and more serious verses.

== Sources ==
- Kusche Zettelmeyer, Maria, Juan Pantoja de la Cruz, Madrid, 1964. Maria Kusche was a leading researcher on 16th century court painters Sofonisba Anguissola, Juan Pantoja de la Cruz and Alonso Sanchez Coello.
- Maria Kusche Zettelmeyer, Juan Pantoja de la Cruz y sus seguidores, Bartolomé González, Rodrigo de Villandrando y Antonio López Polanco . Fundación de Apoyo a la Historia del Arte Hispánico, 2007. ISBN 978-84-935054-2-4
