= Treaty of Joinville =

1584 treaty between the Catholic League and Spain

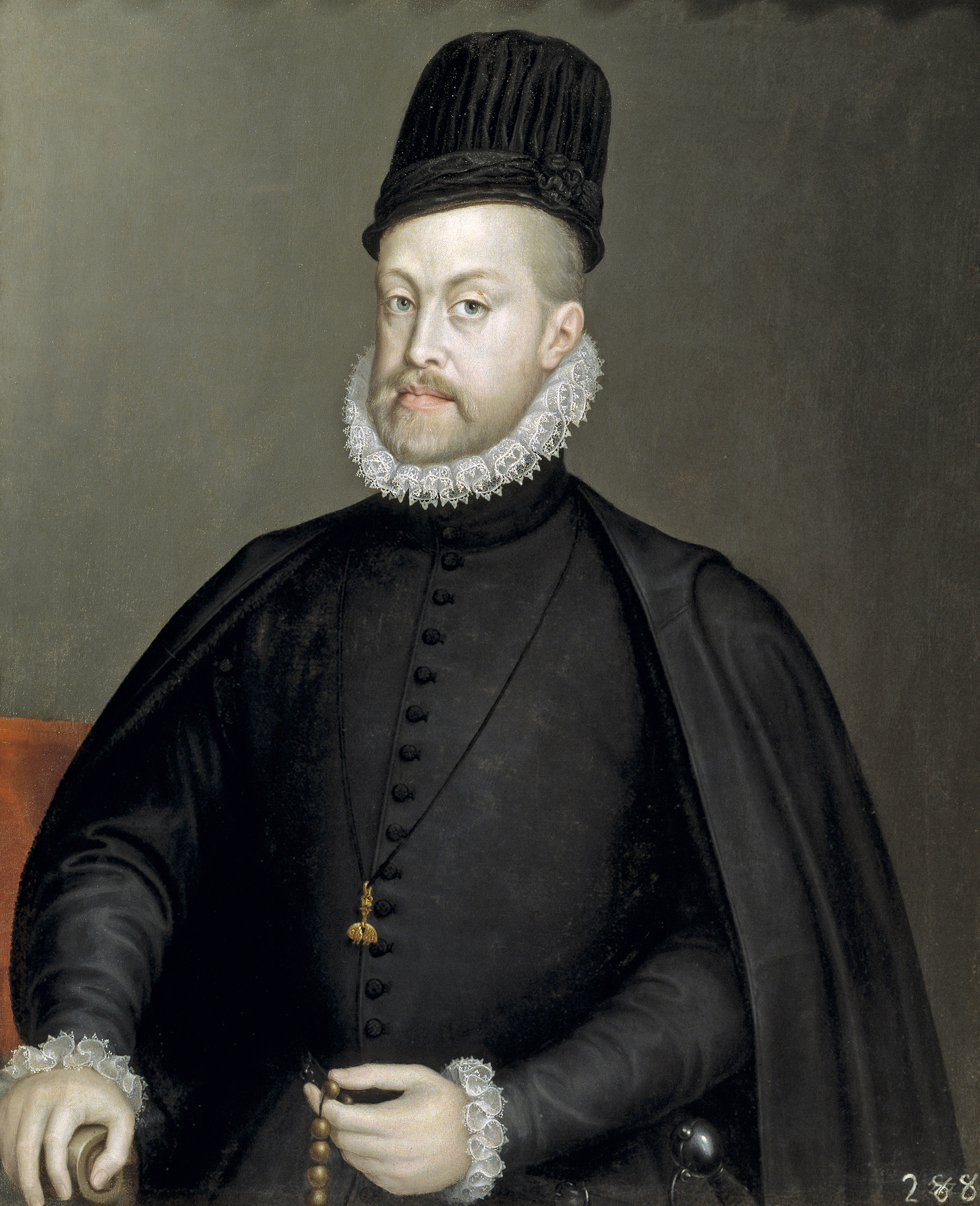
Portrait of Philip II by the painter Sofonisba Anguissola (Prado Museum, Madrid)

The Treaty of Joinville was signed in secret on 31 December 1584 by the Catholic League, led by the French House of Guise, and Habsburg Spain. The meeting took place in France at the Joinville, Haute-Marne, at a palace of the House of Guise.

== Treaty provisions ==
In the treaty:

- Philip II of Spain agreed to finance the Catholic League (50,000 crowns per member) and recognized cardinal Charles de Bourbon as heir to Henry III of France.
- Upon Charles de Bourbon's accession to the French throne, he would re-confirm the Treaty of Cateau-Cambrésis.
- Catholicism would be the only religion allowed in France. Those who would not convert to Catholicism would be exterminated.
- Decrees of the Council of Trent would be enforced.
- The Franco-Ottoman alliance and French voyages to the Indies and Azores would cease.
- Areas in the Netherlands yielded to France by so-called heretics would be returned to Spain.

== Consequences for England ==
By 1585, the treaty became known in England. It was believed, though falsely, the aim of the treaty was to form a Catholic alliance against Protestants throughout Europe.

However, Elizabeth was terrified by the nightmare scenario of a Catholic alliance between France and Spain against England, even if the prospect had been remote because of the prolonged Habsburg-Valois conflict. For the first time, she endorsed direct military intervention in the Spanish Netherlands, in the process of an uprising against Spanish rule. The Spanish response was a crackdown under a hardline military governor, Alexander Farnese, Duke of Parma.

Elizabeth's decision was a complete reversal of her previous policy not to support rebels rebelling against legitimate authority, as she feared that she was vulnerable to revolts from English Catholics. The new policy illustrated just how much the Treaty of Joinville alarmed her.

As a direct consequence, Elizabeth signed the Treaty of Nonsuch with the United Provinces in 1585 and financed an expedition to the Netherlands, led by Robert Dudley, 1st Earl of Leicester, of 7,000 to 8,000 soldiers. That was a catalyst for the war between England and Spain and resulted in the launch of the Spanish Armada in 1588.

== See also ==
- French Wars of Religion
- List of treaties

== Sources ==
- Baumgartner, Frederic J. (1975). Radical Reactionaries: The Political Thought of the French Catholic League. Librairie Droz.
- Davenport, F.G.; Paullin, C.O. (2004). European Treaties Bearing on the History of the United States and Its Dependencies. Carnegie Institution of Washington publication. Lawbook Exchange. pp. 223–228. ISBN 978-1-58477-422-8. – Text of the Treaty of Joinville in early modern French on pages 225–228.
- Doran, Susan; Jones, Norman, eds. (2014). The Elizabethan World. Routledge.
