= Juan de Tassis, 1st Count of Villamediana =

Spanish diplomat and official

Acuña in The Somerset House Conference, 1604

Juan de Tassis y Acuña, 1st Count of Villamediana, (Valladolid, 15?? - Madrid, 1607) was a Spanish diplomat and official, awarded his title by king Philip III of Spain in 1603, and the General Head of Spanish Post Offices.

== Life ==
The family was originally Italian, and its members extended through Europe, from Flanders to Spain. The Holy Roman Emperor Charles V awarded them positions as heads of public lodgings (Hostes) and postal offices (postas). Johann Baptist von Taxis was the head of the Kaiserliche Reichspost. His oldest son, Raymond (Ramón) de Tassis Wachtendonk (circa 1515-1579), went to Spain and became postmaster general of the kingdom; a younger son remained in Germany and became the forefather of the future House of Thurn und Taxis, which was therefore a cadet branch of the Tassis family of Villamediana. Raymond married Catalina de Acuña (circa 1515 - 1579). Juan de Tassis was his son and heir.
Juan is not to be confused with his paternal uncle Juan Bautista de Tassis Wachtendonk (1530-1610), who was Spanish Ambassador in France between 1581-1584 and 1598-1604.

Under king Philip II of Spain he was in the service of the unfortunate Prince Don Carlos, who died as a teenager. He participated in the war fighting the Morisco revolt in Granada and in North African towns such as Oran, now in Algeria. He was made a Knight of the Order of Santiago, serving the 3rd Duke of Alba in the conquest of Lisbon, Portugal, 29 June 1581. While he was there, his only son, Juan de Tassis, 2nd Count of Villamediana was born. In 1583 Tassis returned to Madrid with the king. He was created the 1st Count of Villamediana by king Philip III of Spain on 12 October 1603, confirming him as Correo Mayor, or Head of the Postal Communications within the Spanish Empire. He was married to Maria de Peralta Muñatones.

== Embassy to England ==
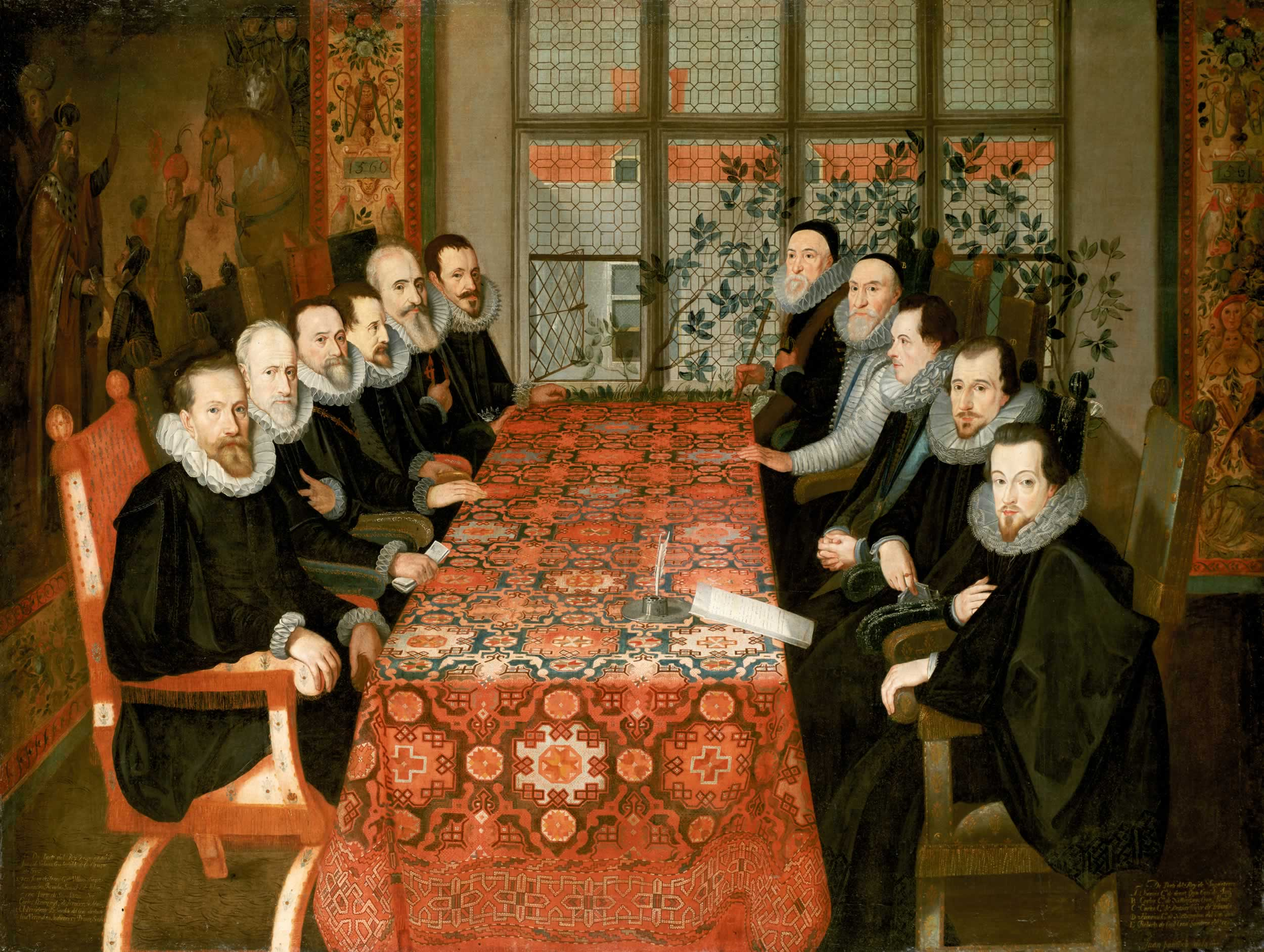
The Somerset House Conference, 19 August 1604. Juan de Tassis is the second from the window on the left. Probably by Juan Pantoja de la Cruz, (1553–1608)

Tassis headed a Spanish-Flemish delegation which visited England in 1603 to seek an end to the war with England which had begun in 1585. Elizabeth I had recently died and her successor James I sought to end the long and draining conflict with Spain which he inherited.

There was a false rumour of his arrival in England in June 1603. He arrived at Dover on 23 August. The Earl of Devonshire brought him to lodge at Christ Church, Oxford before meeting King James and Anne of Denmark at Woodstock Palace. Efforts were made to ensure his reception was equal to that given to the French ambassador, the Marquis of Rosny. However, one of his entourage died of the plague at Oxford, and so his audience with the King was deferred. Arbella Stuart wrote that he brought perfumed leather goods as gifts for courtiers. Tassis moved to Southampton, and was received by King James and Anne of Denmark at Winchester on 24 September. He gave a speech in Spanish which was translated into Italian for King James. Lewes Lewknor gave the King's reply in Spanish.

At Salisbury, landlords were dissatisfied with payments for lodging his retinue, and there was a riot during which a Spanish man was killed. When James and Anne of Denmark planned to make a Royal Entry to Southampton on 30 October, Villamediana rented window space along the route to watch the procession.

Tassis attended the court masque The Vision of the Twelve Goddesses in January 1604, and danced with Lucy, Countess of Bedford. The French ambassador Christophe de Harlay, Count of Beaumont was not invited. In April, Tassis asked King James if the Constable Velasco could be lodged at Somerset House, and Anne of Denmark granted his request. In June, as the Constable had not yet arrived, Tassis moved into the lodging at Somerset House that had been prepared for Velasco. Tassis and the Constable bought jewels as gifts for the ladies of the court of Denmark, some from Arnold Lulls in London, several from goldsmiths in Brussels.

The Constable came to London in August 1604, and the Anglo-Spanish peace treaty was successfully signed on 28 August. When Tassis left England, Anne of Denmark gave him a chain of gold fashioned like snakes, enamelled green and set with diamonds, supplied by a London goldsmith. Nicholas Howker, for £180.

After the Gunpowder Plot, the Jesuit Henry Garnet was arrested at Hindlip Hall. He was brought to the Tower of London and questioned. He mentioned visiting Tassis two or three times, at Walsingham House and at Somerset House.

== Later life ==
Tassis died in 1607 and was buried at the Principal Chapel of the Convento de San Agustín, Valladolid. His son, Juan de Tassis, 2nd Count of Villamediana, inherited the Villamediana title and the position of head of the Imperial Posts, before being assassinated in 1622.
