= Treaty of Nonsuch =

1585 treaty between England and the Dutch rebels

1732 copy of the text of the Treaty of Nonsuch (click for full PDF)

The Treaty of Nonsuch was signed on 10 August 1585 by Elizabeth I of England and the Dutch rebels fighting against Spanish rule. It was the first international treaty signed by what would become the Dutch Republic. It was signed at Nonsuch Palace, England.

== Terms ==
The treaty was provoked by the signing of the Treaty of Joinville in 1584 between Philip II of Spain and the Catholic League in which Philip II promised to finance the League.

Elizabeth I agreed to supply 6,400 foot soldiers and 1,000 cavalry (who were to be led by Robert Dudley, the 1st Earl of Leicester) which were initially intended as a way of lifting the siege of Antwerp, with an annual subsidy of 600,000 florins, about a quarter of the annual cost of the revolt. As a surety for this assistance, the Dutch were to hand over Brill and Flushing to England, which it would garrison at its own expense. They were known as the Cautionary Towns.

The treaty granted Elizabeth the right to appoint two councillors to the Council of State of the United Provinces.

The surety provoked the objection of Zeeland, which was to lose the most by this measure. Elizabeth rejected the title of General of the Provinces, offered to her in the treaty.

== Aftermath ==
Philip II viewed the treaty as a declaration of war against him by Elizabeth I, and the Anglo-Spanish War is conventionally considered to have begun at this point. Three years later, he launched the Spanish Armada and attempted to invade and conquer England. The resources spent by Philip on the Armada (10 million ducats) undoubtedly diverted significant resources from fighting the Dutch revolt. Around 110 million ducats were spent on the partly-successful campaign against the resurgent revolt.

Meanwhile, Leicester's brief stint as governor of the United Provinces turned into a failure, as the Habsburg forces continued their advance, while Leicester came into increasing conflicts with the States of Holland and Zealand about their respective duties and competences. In October 1587, the States of Holland published the Deduction written by lawyer François Vranck (or Vrancken), arguing that the States had always held sovereignty over their province, and that no count, king, duke, prince, queen or earl could ever take a decision without their consideration and consent. Johan van Oldenbarnevelt, backed by the States of Holland, revoked Leicester's command of the States' army at the end of 1587. In early April 1588, Leicester formally resigned as Governor of the United Provinces. Less than two weeks later, the States General issued the instruction of 12 April 1588, which transferred all Leicester's duties and competences to the Council of State, while all officials were discharged of their oath to Leicester and given a new oath to the States General, marking the formal establishment of the Dutch Republic. Despite this fallout, the Treaty of Nonsuch remained in force, and the Anglo-Dutch alliance would defeat the Spanish Armada just a few months later in July–August 1588.

The Treaty of Nonsuch was renewed and amended by the Treaty of Westminster of 6/16 August 1598 between the States-General and the Privy Council on behalf of Elizabeth.

== See also ==
- List of treaties

== Primary sources ==
- The text of the Treaty of Nonsuch (1585)
- W, S. (1732). A General Collection of Treatys, Manifestos, Contracts of Marriage, Renunciations, and other Publick Papers, from the Year 1495, to the Year 1712. A General Collection of Treatys. J. J. and P. Knapton.
  - pp. 83–88: Treaty of Nonsuch (10 August 1585).
  - pp. 89–91: Placard of the States General of the United Provinces, conferring the government of their Countries upon the Earl of Leicester (6 February 1586).
  - pp. 92–97: Placard discharging the Dutch from their Oath to the Earl of Leicester. (States General of the United Provinces, 12 April 1588).
