= Diagrams and Explanations of the Wonderful Machines of the Far West =

Book by Johann Schreck

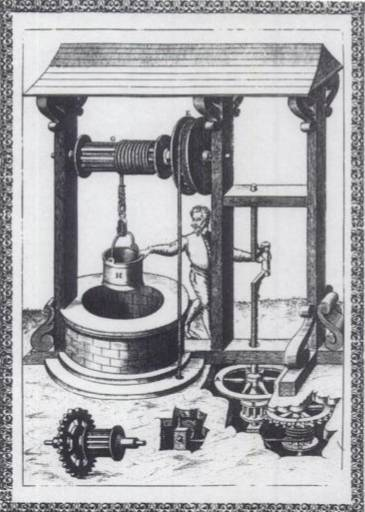
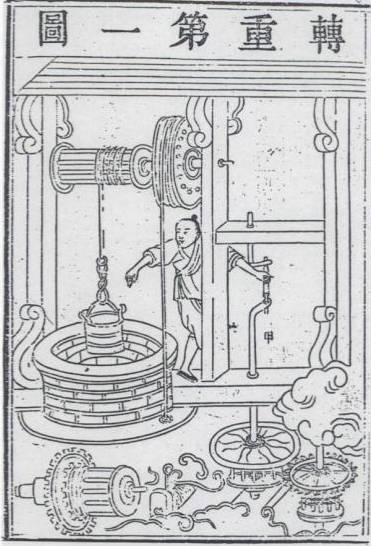
Left image: a description of a windlass well, in Agostino Ramelli, 1588.
Right image: Description of a windlass well, in Diagrams and explanations of the wonderful machines of the Far West, 1627.
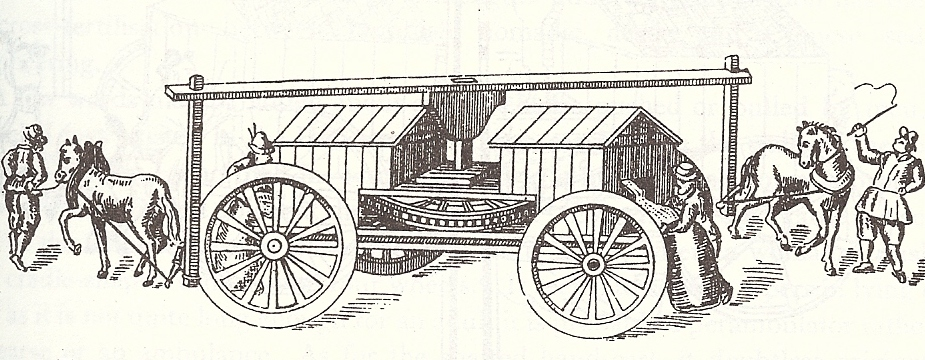
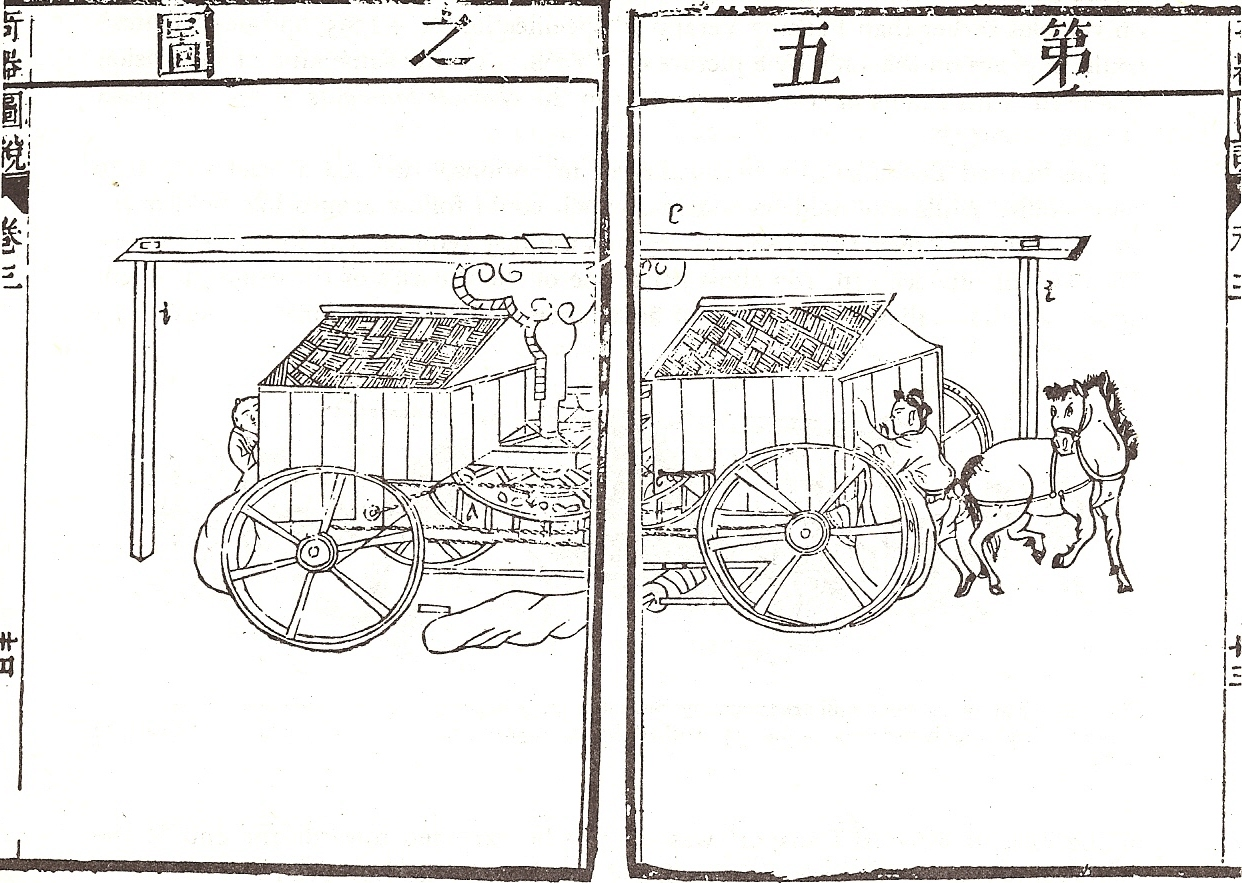
Left image: Original Pompeo Targone field mill in Zonca's treatise of 1607.
Right image: Chinese adaptation of the field mill in Diagrams and explanations of the wonderful machines of the Far West, 1627.

Diagrams and Explanations of the Wonderful Machines of the Far West (Chinese: Yuǎn xī qí qì túshuō lù zuì, 遠西奇器圖說錄最, often abridged as Qí qì túshuō, 奇器圖說) was an encyclopedia of Western mechanical devices translated into Chinese by the Jesuit Johann Schreck (1576-1630), and the Chinese scholar Wang Zheng (王徵 1571–1644). This book was the first to present Western mechanical knowledge to a Chinese audience. The book was published in 1627.

Particularly, the works of the Italian engineers Agostino Ramelli or Vittorio Zonca were reproduced in this translation, as well as those of the French engineer Jacques Besson. Plates depicting European machine were reproduced quite precisely, although in a Chinese pictorial style.

== See also ==
- Jesuit China missions
