= Vittorio Zonca =

Italian architect, engineer, and writer (1568–1602)

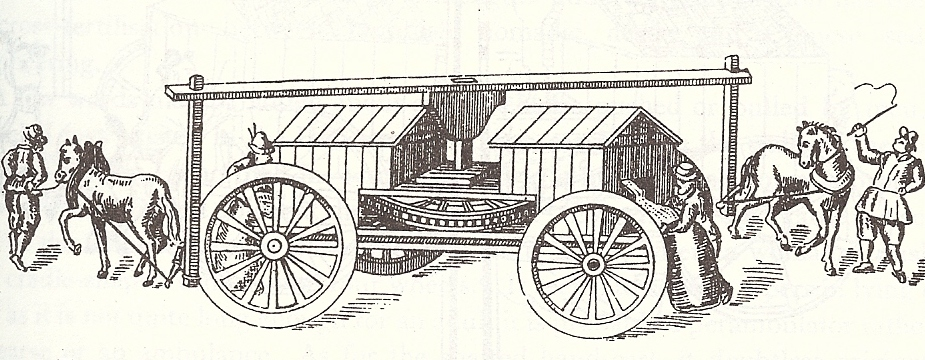
Pompeo Targone's field mill, illustrated in Zonca's treatise (1607)

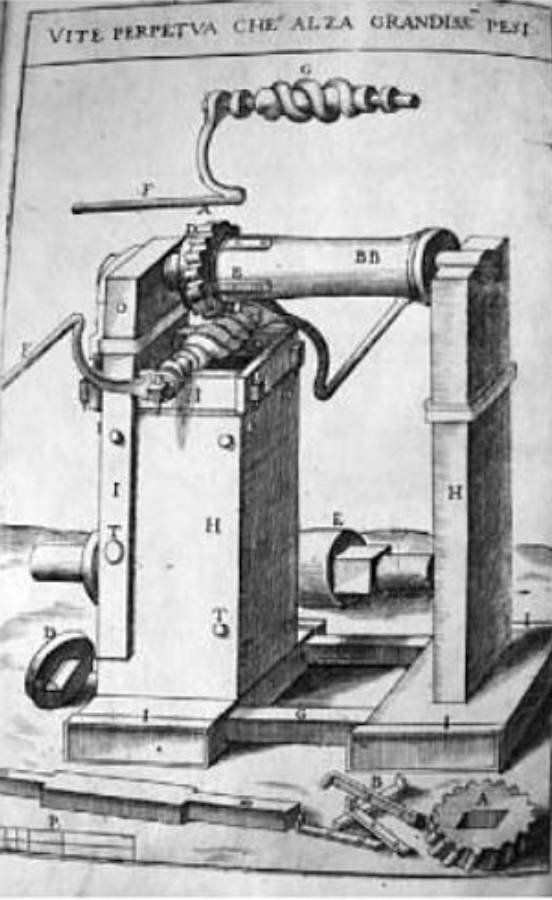
An endless screw and winch illustrated in Zonca's treatise

Vittorio Zonca (1568–1602) was an Italian architect, engineer, and technical writer. He served as an architect for the city of Padua and is best known for his Novo teatro di machine et edificii (New theatre of machines and buildings), an illustrated treatise on mechanical devices published posthumously in Padua in 1607 by Pietro Bertelli.

== Life and work ==
Zonca was born in Padua in 1568 and appointed municipal architect there in 1597. He died on 15 November 1602.

His Novo teatro belongs to the Renaissance genre of theatres of machines, books presenting machinery through illustrations and accompanying explanations. Zonca's work contains 42 copperplate engravings depicting machines for tasks such as lifting loads, milling grain, pumping water, operating sluices, printing, papermaking, and textile production. The explanations detail components of the machines, often identifying parts with letters corresponding to the illustrations.

A few notable machines documented by Zonca include a water powered silk twisting mill, devices for manufacturing gunpowder, and a field mill devised by military engineer Pompeo Targone. Zonca also illustrated a supposed perpetual motion device. Some of Zonca's illustrations appear to have been derived from an unpublished architectural treatise by Francesco di Giorgio Martini.

== Reception ==
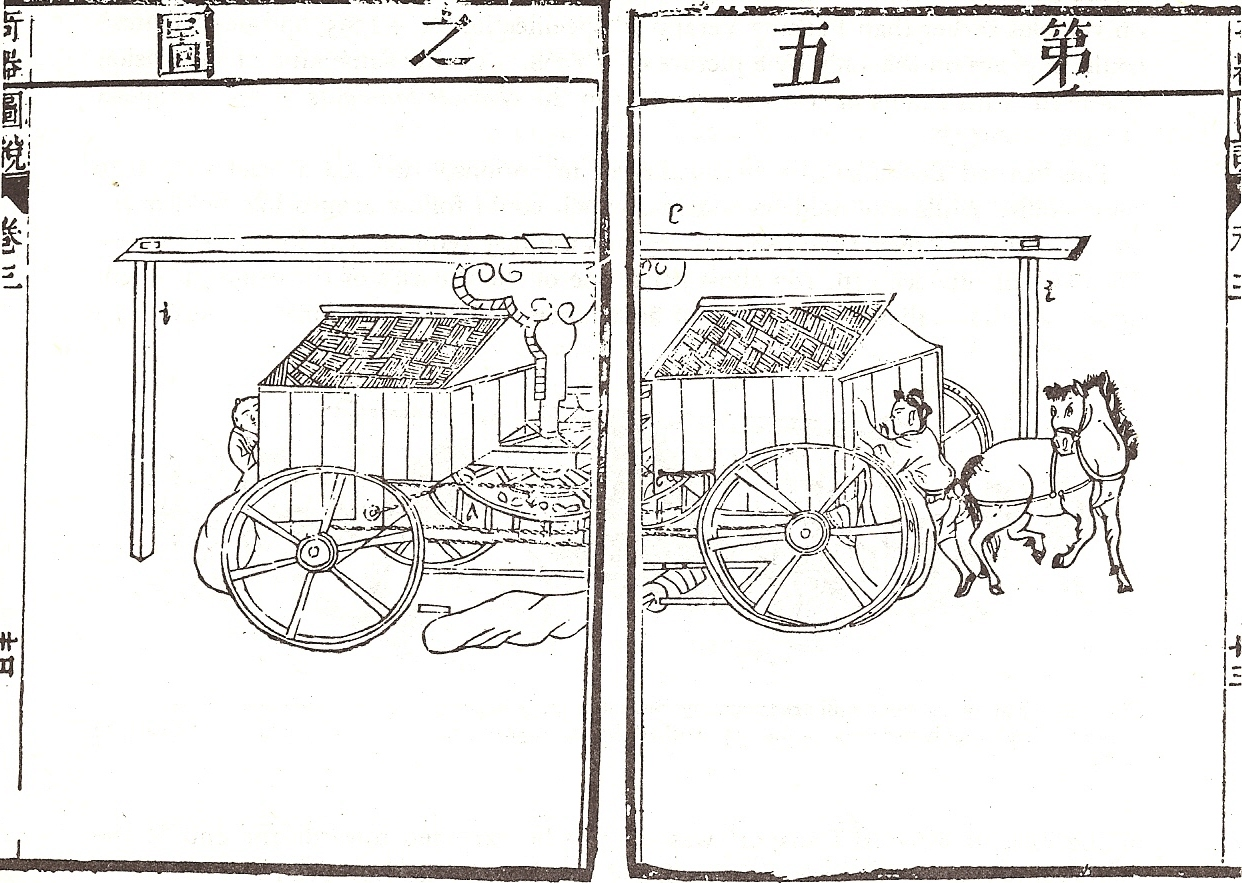
Field mill adapted from a European design in the Chinese Qiqi Tushuo (1627)

After its initial publication in 1607, Zonca's Novo teatro was subsequently reprinted in 1621, 1624 or 1627, and 1656. The treatise also contributed to the transmission of European mechanical knowledge to China. Machines derived from European works including Zonca's appeared in the Qiqi Tushuo (Diagrams and Explanations of the Wonderful Machines of the Far West), a Chinese encyclopedia of Western machines. This work was compiled by Johann Schreck and Wang Zheng in 1627 and featured an adaptation of Targone's field mill.

== Works ==
- Zonca, Vittorio (1607). Novo teatro di machine et edificii per varie et sicure operationi. Padua: Pietro Bertelli.
