= Field mill (carriage) =

Mobile agricultural equipment

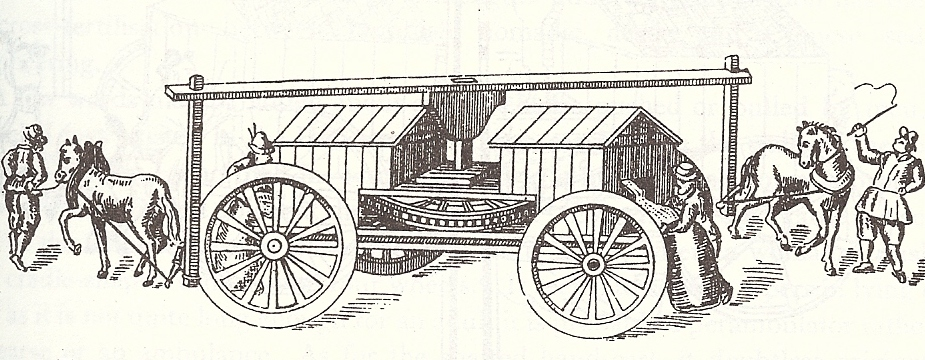
Pompeo Targone's field mill, from Vittorio Zonca's treatise (1607)

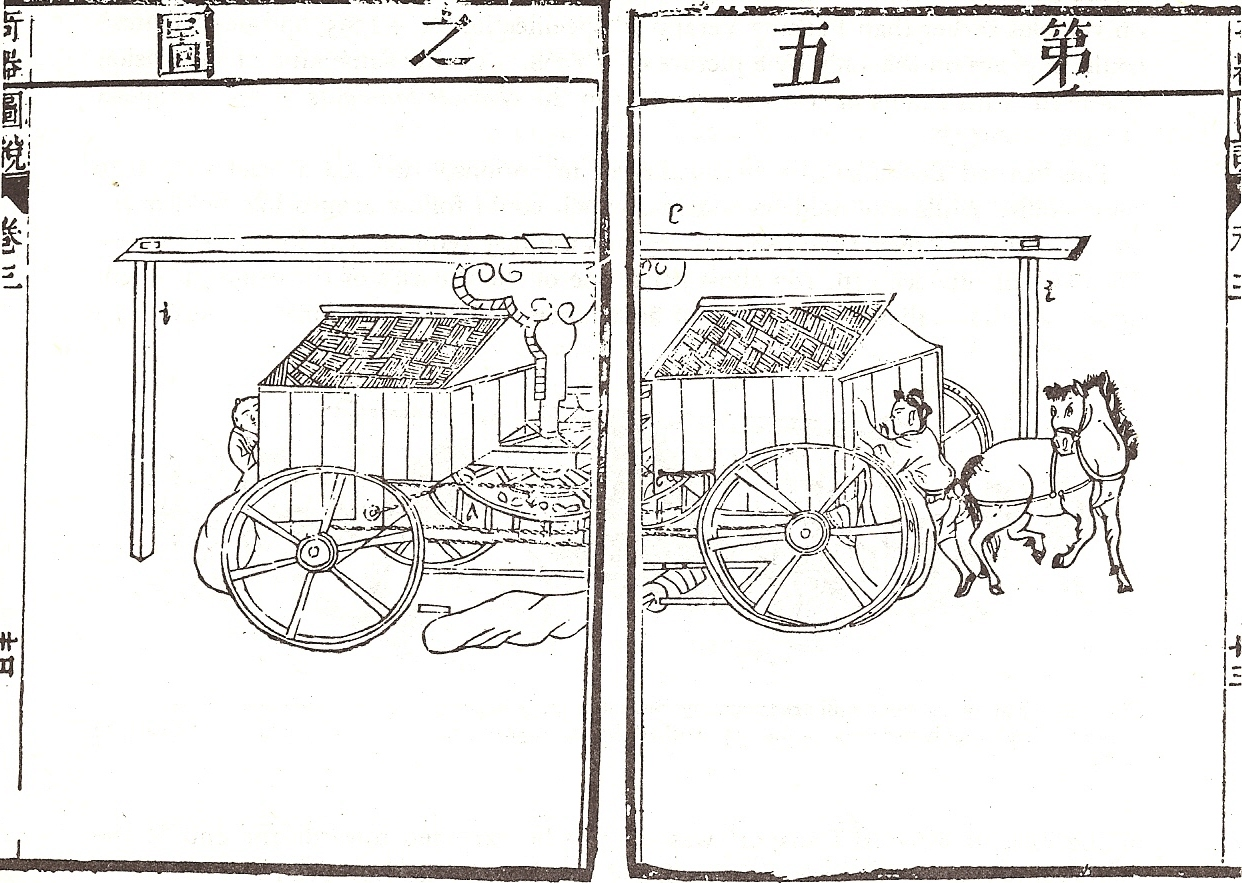
The field mill in the Chinese book Qiqi Tushuo (1627), by Johann Schreck and Wang Zheng

A field mill, also known as a camp mill, was a premodern vehicle which acted as a mobile mill used for grinding grains, which had the very practical use of feeding a moving army.

== History ==
=== Later Zhao ===
In the Yezhongji (鄴中記) ('Record of Affairs at the Capital of the Later Zhao Dynasty') by Lu Hui, covering the history of the Later Zhao (319–351 AD) court in China, the text describes various mechanical devices used, including the wheeled odometer for measuring distance and the south-pointing chariot for indicating cardinal direction. Two engineers in particular, the Palace Officer Xie Fei and Director of Imperial Workshops Wei Mengbian, were known for their designs and worked at the court of Shi Hu (r. 334–349). The two had crafted a four-wheeled carriage about 6 m (20 ft) long with water-spouting dragons hanging over a large golden Buddhist statue that had a mechanical wooden statue of a Daoist continually rubbing his front. Other mechanical figures included ten Daoists dressed in monastic robes who continually rotated around the Buddha while periodically bowing, saluting, and throwing incense into a censer. All of these mechanical figures were driven only by the movement of the carriage; once the carriage halted, the figures stopped moving and the water stopped spouting from the artificial dragons.

Xie and Wei created a similar device operated by wheel motion called the field mill, although it served a more practical purpose than the theatrical display of moving statues and water-spouting dragons. The Yezhongji states that the two devised a "pounding cart" or "pounding wagon" which had figurine statues armed with real tilt hammers who pounded and hulled rice only when the cart moved. In addition to this they had a "mill cart" (field mill or camp mill) which had rotating millstones mounted on their frames, which would rotate and grind wheat as the cart moved forward. Just like the carriage with mechanical figures mentioned above, when the carriage stopped, the devices associated with them halted.

=== Europe ===
Use of the field mill in China seems to have died out in use after the Later Zhao, since it was no longer mentioned in Chinese texts until Ming Dynasty.

The Italian military engineer Pompeo Targone, who was most notably involved in the Siege of La Rochelle (1627-1628) in western France, invented the field mill in Europe by 1580. As shown in the Italian Vittorio Zonca's engineering treatise of 1607, two mills mounted to a wagon are rotated by a horse whim and gearing while in a stationary position at military camp or near billets.

In the Yuanxi Qiqi Tushuo Luzui ('Collected Diagrams and Explanations of the Wonderful Machines of the Far West') compiled and translated in 1627 by German Jesuit Johann Schreck (1576–1630) and Ming Dynasty Chinese author Wang Zheng (王徵 1571–1644), a field mill is shown amongst other devices. In this picture, two mills are operated by the gearing of a rotating bar and a whippletree harnessed to a single horse, unlike the two horses seen in Zonca's illustration.

== See also ==
- List of Chinese inventions
