= Pompeo Targone =

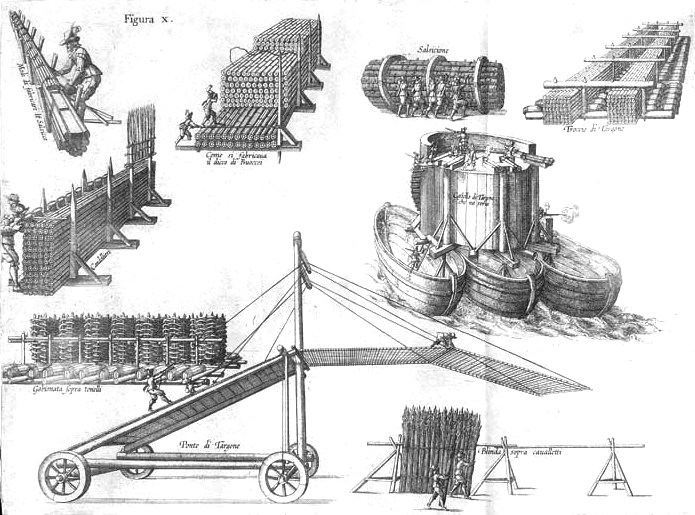
Machines for the Siege of Ostend developed by Pompeo Targone and G. Gamurini. Drawn by P. Giustiniano, Delle guerre di Fiandra libri VI, Antwerp, 1609.

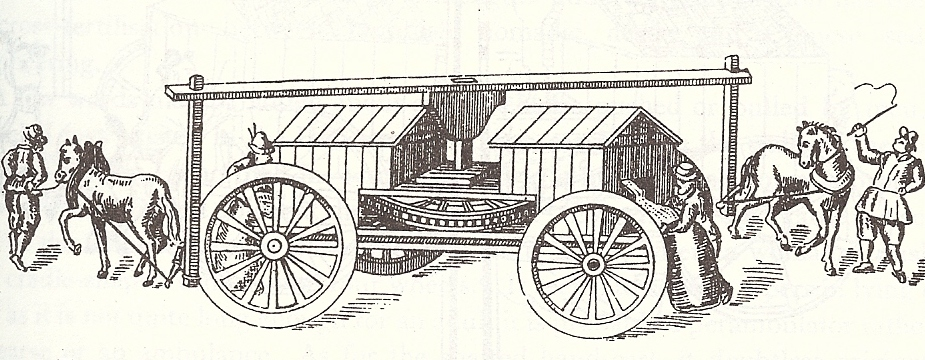
Pompeo Targone's field mill in Vittorio Zonca's treatise of 1607.

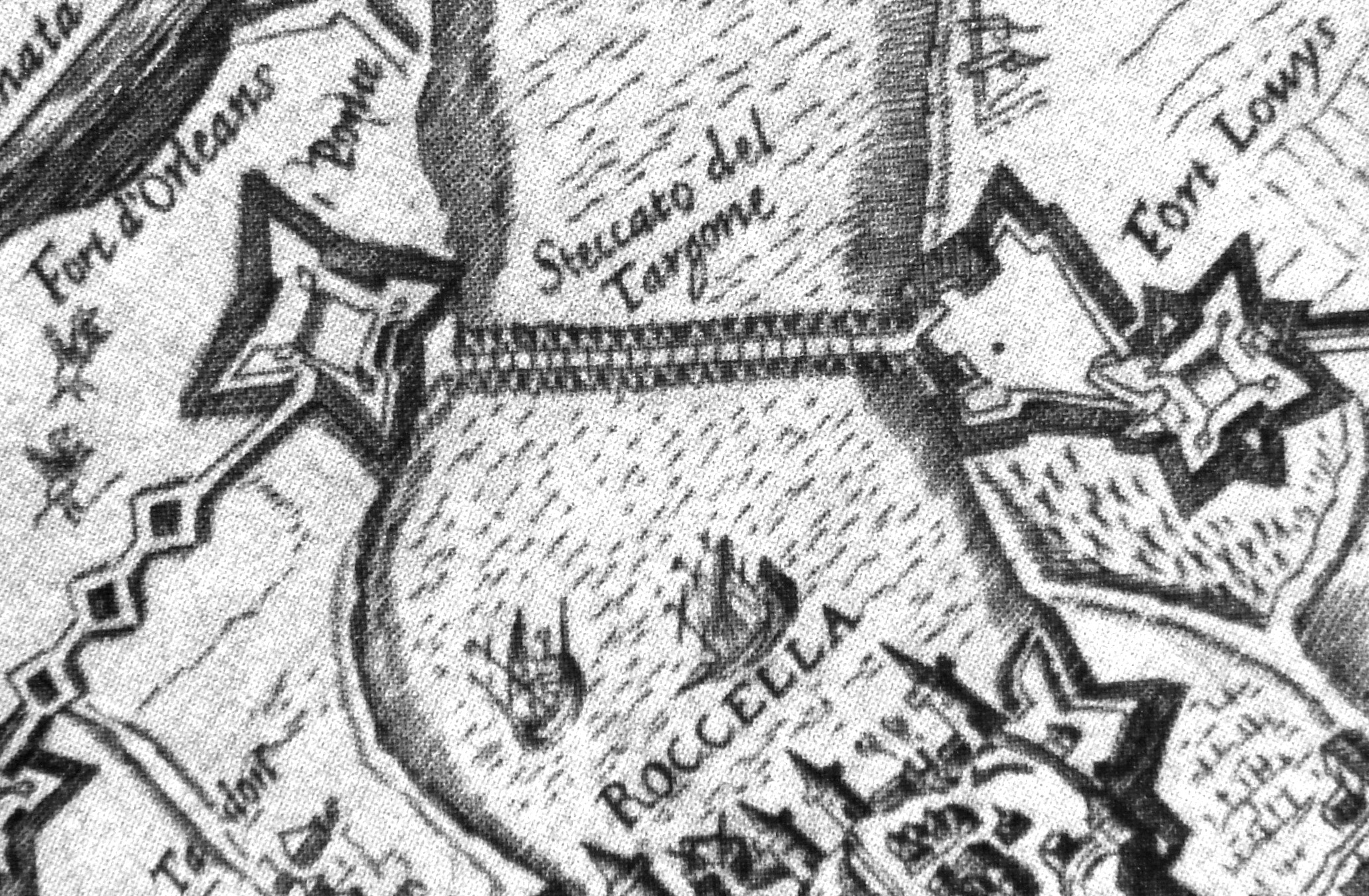
Seawall built by Pompeo Targone at the Siege of La Rochelle, 1627.

Pompeo Targone (1575 – c. 1630), son of a Venetian goldsmith, was an Italian engineer in the service of popes Clement VIII and Paul V. He built the ciborium tabernacle in the Blessed Sacrament chapel of the Archbasilica of St. John Lateran, and one of the altars in the Basilica di Santa Maria Maggiore.

Targone gained notoriety for his inventiveness as a military engineer in the Siege of Ostend (1604) and the Siege of La Rochelle (1627-1628). Targone proposed to block the channel leading to the harbour of La Rochelle in order to stop all supplies to the city, but his structure was broken by the winter weather. The idea was later taken up by the Royal architect Clément Métezeau and the Parisian mason Jean Thiriau. Targone has also been credited with the invention of the field mill in Vittorio Zonca's treatise on mechanical arts.

== See also ==
- Artists in biographies by Giovanni Baglione
- Diagrams and explanations of the wonderful machines of the Far West
