= Christophe de Bonours =

Christophe de Bonours (active 1601–1628) was a soldier and author active in the Spanish Netherlands but seemingly originally from the County of Burgundy. He served as a company captain during the Siege of Ostend, where he was wounded. He would later write a treatise on nobility and a memoir of the Siege of Ostend.

== Publications ==
- Eugéniaretilogie (Liège, Léonard Streel, 1616)
- Le memorable siege d'Ostende (Brussels, Jan van Meerbeeck, 1628)
