= Anna E. C. Simoni =

Anna Harvey-Simoni
- Born: Anneliese Simoni; August 30, 1916; Leipzig, Kingdom of Saxony, German Empire
- Died: January 8, 2007 (aged 90); Gillingham, Dorset, United Kingdom
- Occupation: Librarian
- Spouse: William Harvey
- Awards: Knight in the Order of the Netherlands Lion, 1998

Academic background
- Education: Latin and Italian
- Alma mater: University of Glasgow

Academic work
- Discipline: Bibliographer
- Sub-discipline: History of printed books
- Institutions: The British Library
- Main interests: Clandestine Dutch printing during the Second World War; printing in the Dutch Golden Age
- Notable works: Catalogue of Books from the Low Countries, 1601–1621, in the British Library (1990)

Anna Elisabeth Charlotte Harvey-Simoni (1916–2007), Curator of the Dutch section at The British Library's Department of Printed Books (1950–81), was a bibliographer and research librarian who mainly worked on books printed in the Dutch Golden Age.

== Life ==
Born Anneliese Simoni to a Jewish family in Leipzig on 30 August 1916, she was educated in Leipzig. She studied Latin and Italian at the universities of Turin and Genoa but was unable to complete her course of studies there when the Italian racial laws came into force, and in 1938 she sought refuge in Britain. She eventually obtained her degree at the University of Glasgow. She joined the Women's Auxiliary Air Force in 1943 and was demobbed in 1946.

Simoni was employed at the British Library at the beginning of 1950, and by the end of that year had been appointed curator of the Dutch section in the Department of Printed Books. She remained in that capacity until her retirement in 1981.

On 24 October 1985 she married William Harvey, taking his name but continuing to publish under her own. In 1991 a Festschrift was published in her honour, Across the Narrow Seas: Studies in the history and bibliography of the Low Countries presented to Anna E. C. Simoni, edited by Susan Roach. Contributors included Lotte Hellinga, Dennis E. Rhodes, Helen Wallis, Jonathan Israel, and T. A. Birrell.

Simoni died at home in Gillingham, Dorset, on 8 January 2007.

== Works ==
- Publish and be Free: A catalogue of clandestine books printed in The Netherlands, 1940–1945, in the British Library (1975)
- Catalogue of Books from the Low Countries, 1601–1621, in the British Library (1990)
- The Ostend Story: Early tales of the great siege and the mediating role of Henrick van Haestens (2003)

== Awards ==
- Knight in the Order of the Netherlands Lion, 1998
- Premio della Citta di Genova, 1999
- Honorary doctorate, University of Genoa, 2000
