= Charles Fairfax =

Charles Fairfax may refer to:

- Charles Fairfax (antiquary) (1597–1673), genealogist and antiquary
- Charles S. Fairfax (1829–1869), American politician and peer
- Charles Fairfax (soldier) (1567–1604), English soldier
- Charles Fairfax, 5th Viscount Fairfax of Emley (died 1711), English peer
- Charles Fairfax (priest), Church of Ireland priest
