= Belgian Newspaper Catalogue =

Belgian online database

The Belgian Newspaper Catalogue (formerly Abraham Catalogue of Belgian Newspapers) is an online database of historical Belgian newspapers that are preserved in libraries and other heritage institutions across Flanders and Brussels. The catalogue is part of the Digital Heritage Library.

== Contents ==
The database catalogues the location and ownership of Belgian national, regional, and local newspapers kept in more than one hundred libraries and heritage institutions. So far, over 12,500 newspaper titles published after 1800 are inventoried in the catalogue.

The database shows the most important specifications of each newspaper, such as title, date, and place of publication. Keywords indicate the type of newspaper (with a focus on e.g. trade, sports, or advertising) or the social community at which the newspaper was aimed (e.g. Catholic, liberal, or socialist community). As newspapers were often attached to a certain city or region, the database allows searching on geographical terms.

Users are able to see detailed information on the exact editions and locations of each newspaper, including the format (paper, microform, or digital format) in which it is preserved in each of the institutions. Links are added for newspapers that are consultable online. It is not possible to search on content of any newspaper article.

== Name ==
The database was originally named after Abraham Verhoeven (Antwerp, 1575–1652), the first known publisher of newspapers in the Southern Netherlands. His Nieuwe Tijdinghen (New Tidings) was a substantial contribution to early newspaper publication.

== Development and continuation ==
The database was developed as a project in 2007 by the Hendrik Conscience Heritage Library in cooperation with a large number of heritage institutions. The catalogue was created to increase access to historical newspapers, a goldmine of cultural-historical information. The catalogue is also used as a helpful tool for digitising projects. In this way, it plays an important role in the preservation of these vulnerable documents. Frequent consultation of the newspapers poses considerable risks, especially for those published from 1830 to 1950, which were often printed on fragile and low-quality paper. The only way to preserve their contents for posterity is to copy them to microform or digital format.

Since the end of 2008, the project has been managed by LibraryHeritage.be (then Flanders Heritage Library).

== See also ==
- Cultural heritage
- Library catalog
- Library science
- Archive
- Digital library
- History of newspaper publishing
- Newspaper digitization
- Online public access catalog
