= Thomas Philip Wallrad de Hénin-Liétard d'Alsace =

His Eminence Thomas de Hénin-Liétard
- Cardinal, Archbishop of Mechelen; Primate of the Low Countries
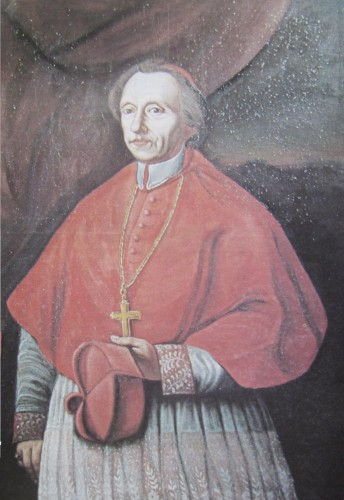
- Church: Catholic Church
- Archdiocese: Mechelen
- Installed: 1715
- Term ended: 1759
- Predecessor: Humbertus Guilielmus de Precipiano
- Successor: Joannes-Henricus de Franckenberg
- Other post: Cardinal-Priest of San Lorenzo in Lucina

Orders
- Consecration: 1716 by Giorgio Spínola
- Created cardinal: 29 November 1719 by Clement XI
- Rank: Cardinal Priest

Personal details
- Born: 12 November 1679 Spanish Netherlands
- Died: 5 January 1759 (aged 79) Mechelen, Austrian Netherlands, Holy Roman Empire
- Buried: Mechelen Cathedral
- Denomination: Roman Catholic
- Motto: Estote Miserecordes

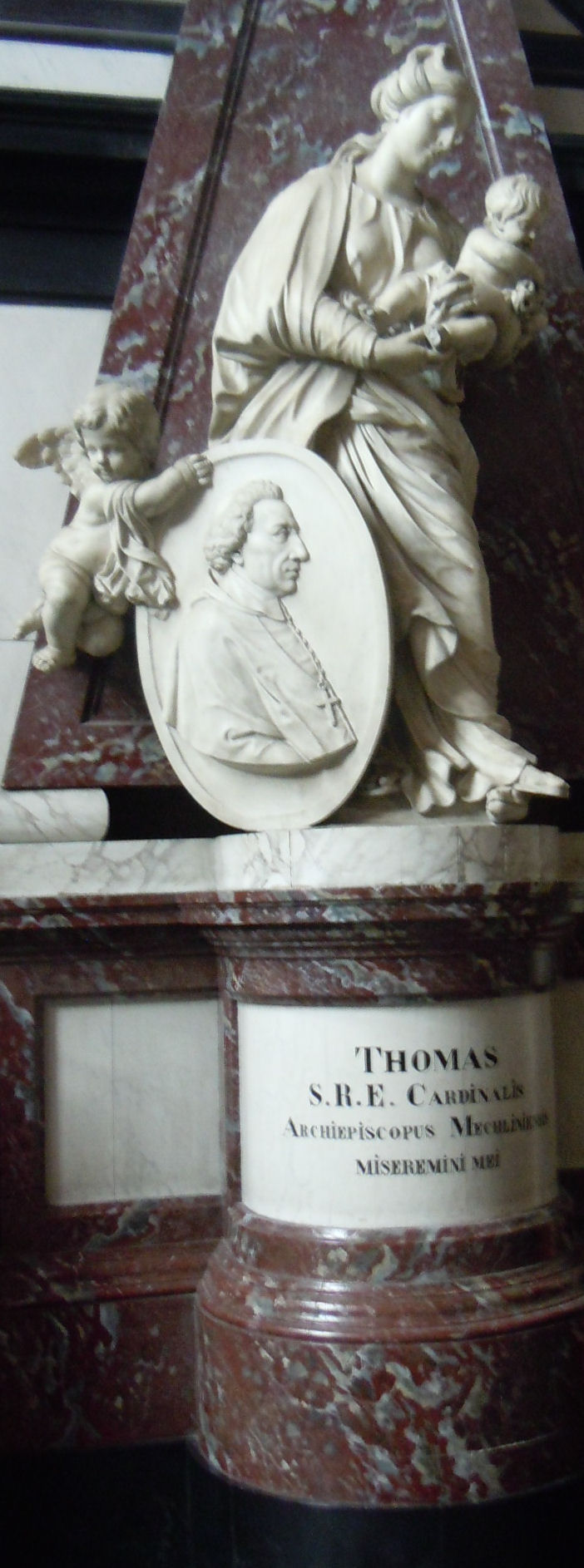
Tomb in Mechelen Cathedral

Thomas Philip Wallrad de Hénin-Liétard d'Alsace named Cardinal d'Alsace (Brussels, 12 November 1679 – 5 January 1759), was a Cardinal and Archbishop of Mechelen, Belgium. He participated in four conclaves; during the conclave of 1758, in which he did not participate, he was Cardinal Protopriest.

== Family ==
His father, Philippe-Louis de Hénin, 7th Count of Bossu was Knight of the Golden Fleece. He was the 11th Prince of Chimay: his family belongs to the family of Hénin-Liétard, (Note: see also Jean-François-Gabriel de Hénin-Liétard) His grandmother was a Princess of Arenberg and Chimay, she was a granddaughter of Charles de Ligne, 2nd Prince of Arenberg. Lodewijk Frans Verreycken, 1st Baron of Bonlez was his great-grandfather.

The brother of the Cardinal was married to Charlotte de Rouvroy, daughter of the Duke of Saint-Simon, who mentioned the Cardinal in his writings. One of his nephews Charles-Alexandre de Hénin-Liétard d'Alsace, Count of Beaumont died in 1794 in Paris by guillotine.

== Career ==
In 1696 he was a noble Canon of the Chapter of Ghent. He completed his studies in Cologne and was ordained as a priest on 15 October 1702, in Rome. He was created in 1712 a papal prelate of honour of Pope Clement XI. In 1714 he was approved by emperor Charles VI as Bishop of Mechelen; his appointment as Archbishop took place on 16 December 1715. In 1716 he was ordained in Vienna by the Apostolic Nuncio to Austria: Mgr. Giorgio Cardinal Spínola. On 29 Nov 1719, age 40, he was named Cardinal, after his support in favor of the Bull of Unigenitus. Cardinal d'Alsace was the first cardinal taking residence in Mechelen, since Cardinal Antoine Perrenot de Granvelle died. He went to Rome to be ordained by the pope. During the episcopate of Cardinal d'Alsace he constructed several important buildings: he had the episcopal palace rebuilt and a new seminary constructed in Mechelen.

In 1747 he pleaded with King Louis XV, who entered Brussels, to have mercy on its inhabitants. The king requested a Te Deum in honour of the victory, but the Cardinal replied: "Only the blood of Christ flows on the altar!"

After the anti-government disturbances, the Great Council produced a high number of death penalties; the cardinal begged the emperor for mercy in 1720. This request was honoured by the Emperor.

Upon the death of Cardinal Ruffo on 18 February 1753, Cardinal d'Alsace became the last surviving Cardinal created by Pope Clement XI.

== Consecrations ==
He was consecrated Bishop during his career.

- Hendrik Jozef van Susteren, bishop of Bruges. † (1716)
- Charles d’Espinoza, O.F.M. Cap, bishop of Antwerp. † (1723)
- Giuseppe Cardinal Spinelli † (1725)
- Thomas John Francis de Strickland de Sizorghe † (1727)
- Wilhelmus Delvaux, bishop of Ypres. † (1732)
- Maximiliaan Antoon van der Noot, Bishop of Ghent. † (1743)
- Guillaume-Philippe de Herzelles, bishop of Antwerp. † (1743)
- Jan-Baptist de Castillion, bishop of Bruges † (1743)
- Daniel O’Reilly † (1748)
- Jan-Robert Caïmo, bishop of Bruges † (1754)

== Culture ==
He participated in the 1721 conclave. In 1738 he sent his private library of more than nine thousand books to the collection of the diocese and chapter of St Rumbold. This collection was recognised as Flemish heritage last year and was conserved by the support of the Fund Baillet Latour. He left an important gold embroidered pontifical ornament that he brought from Rome, and was restored by Henri Van Severen.

He was buried inside the cathedral and succeeded by Cardinal Joannes-Henricus de Franckenberg.

== Ancestry ==
Ancestors of Thomas Philip Wallrad de Hénin-Liétard d'Alsace

8. Maximilien II de Hénin, 5th Count of Bossu
4. Eugène de Hénin, 6th Count of Bossu
9. Alexandrin-Françoise of Gavre
2. Philippe-Louis de Hénin, 7th Count of Bossu; Prince of Chimay
10.Alexander of Arenberg, 7th Prince of Chimay; (1590–1629)
5. Anna-Isabella of Arenberg, Princess of Chimay
11.Magdalene of Egmont
1. Thomas, Cardinal d'Alsace
12. Lodewijk Frans Verreycken, 1st Baron of Bonlez, Lord of Impden
6. Charles Verreycken, 1st Baron of Impden
13. Anne-Marie of Buysleden, Lady of Rode
3. Anne-Louise Verreycken, Baroness of Impden
14. Philippe of Schoonhoven, Lord of Waenrode
7. Marguerite of Schoonhoven
15. Josine of Blehen d'Abée

== Sources ==
- Thomas Philip Wallrad d'Alsace-Boussut de Chimay

Catholic Church titles
Preceded by Humbertus Guilielmus de Precipiano	9th Archbishop of Mechelen; 1715–1759	Succeeded by Joannes-Henricus de Franckenberg
