= Maximilien II de Hénin, 5th Count of Boussu =

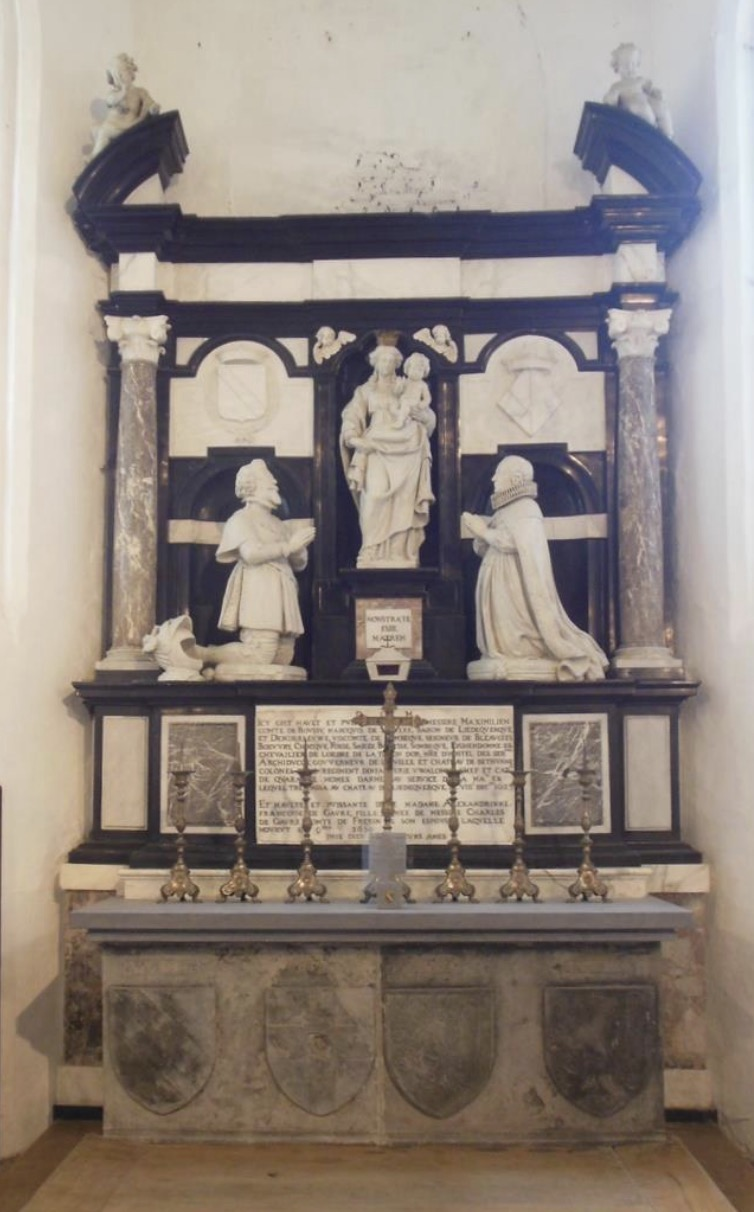
Mausoleum of Maximilien II de Hénin and Alexandrine de Gavre

Maximilien II de Hénin-Liétard (1580–1625), 5th Count of Boussu, was a holder of high office and military command in the Spanish Netherlands whose tomb is a protected monument.

== Life ==
Maximilien was the son of Jacques de Hénin, Marquess of Veere, and Marie of Hanaert, Baroness of Liedekercke. He inherited the countship of Boussu from his childless cousin Pierre (heir to his paternal uncle, Maximilien de Hénin, 3rd Count of Bossu). Through the marriages of his sisters, he became brother-in-law to Duke Otto Henry of Brunswick-Harburg, Íñigo de Borja, Luis de Velasco y Velasco, 2nd Count of Salazar, and Daniel de Hertaing. The family had a castle in what is now Belgium.

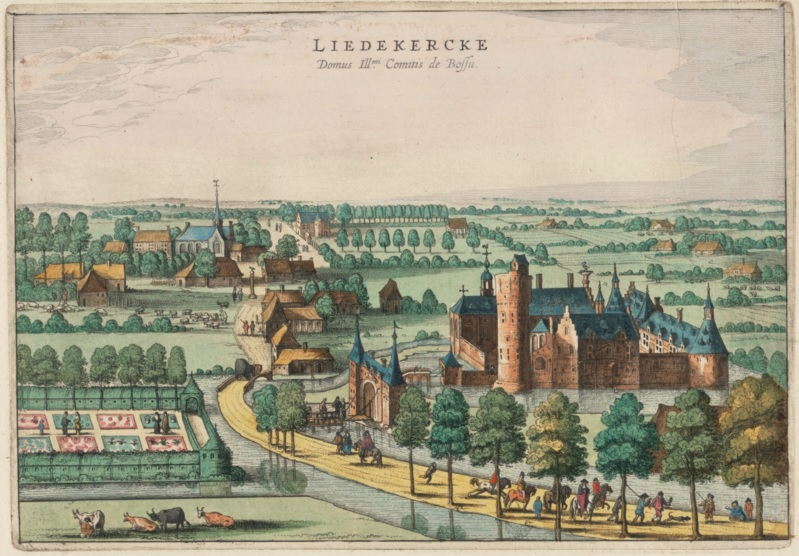
Liedekerke Castle

Maximilien held office at the court of Archduke Albert, and was also governor of the town and castle of Béthune in the County of Artois (1607–1625), colonel of a Walloon infantry regiment, and captain of a Bande d'ordonnance. Although named a knight of the Golden Fleece, he died before being invested with the collar. He died in Liedekerke Castle on 8 December 1625 and was buried in the family chapel in Boussu. He was survived by his wife, who would die in 1650.

== Tomb ==
On his funerary monument, a sculpted effigy of Hénin in armour and surcoat, wearing the collar of the Golden Fleece, kneels to one side of the Virgin Mary, his wife on the side opposite. Together with the other monuments in the crypt of the seigneurial chapel at Boussu, it is on the list of major heritage of Wallonia.

== Titles ==
- Count of Boussu
- Marquess of Veere
- Baron of Liedekercke and Denderleuwe
- Viscount of Lombeecque
- Knight of the Golden Fleece

== Descendants ==
Maximilien de Hénin-Liétard and Alexandrine de Gavre had five children:

- Eugène
- Albert-Maximilien, who died without issue at the Siege of Arras (1640)
- Charles-Florent, who was colonel of an infantry regiment
- Anne-Marguerite, who in 1632 married the Irish soldier Hugh O'Donnell, 2nd Earl of Tyrconnell.
- Philippe-Antoine
