= Book of Hours of Boussu =

15th-century French book of hours

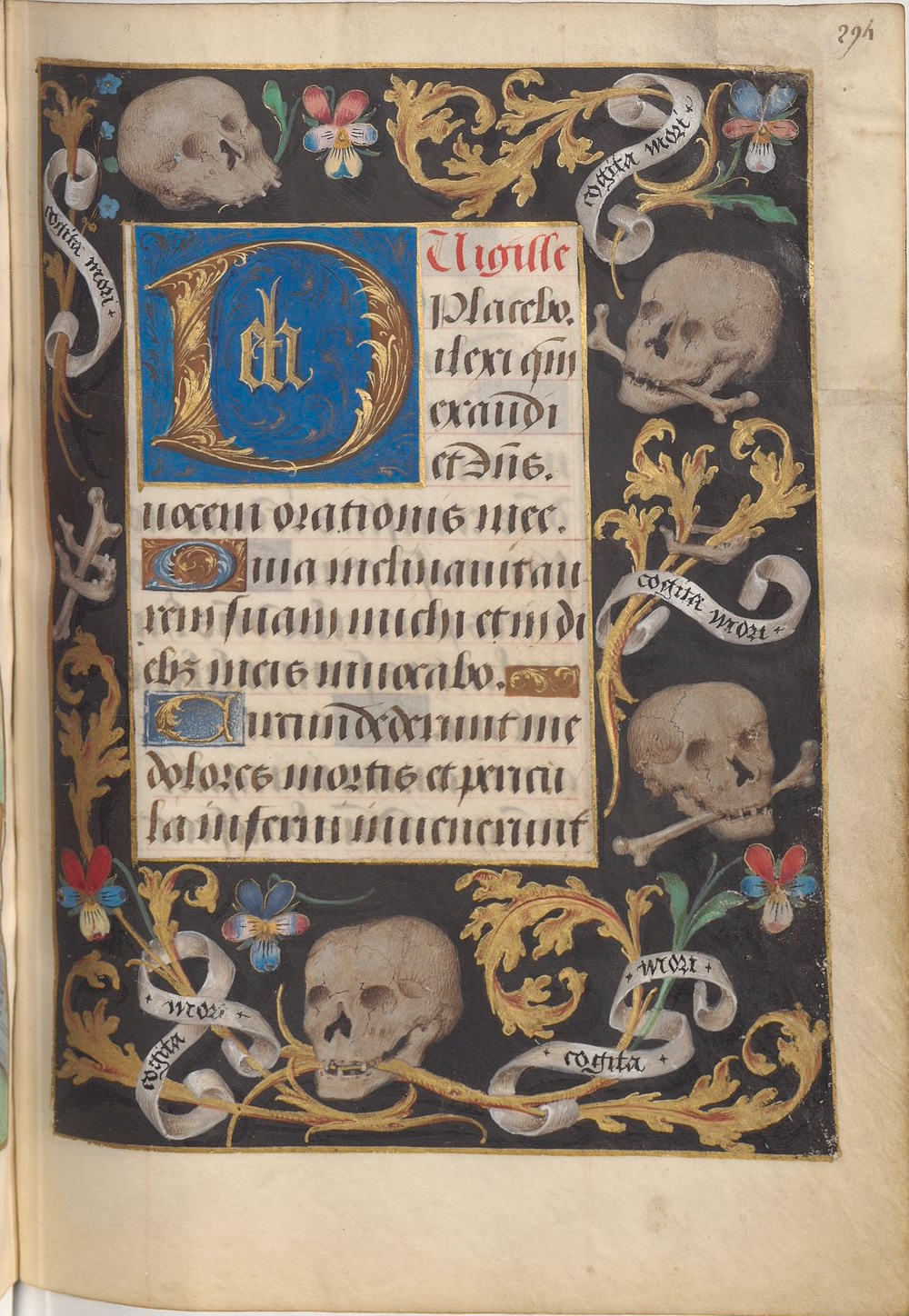
Page from the Book of Hours of Boussu, with a prayer from the Office of the Dead

The Book of Hours of Boussu (French: Heures de Boussu, Paris, BnF Ms-1185 réserve), sometimes referred to as the Book of Hours of Isabelle de Lalaing (French: Heures d'Isabelle de Lalaing) is a richly decorated book of hours made sometime after 1490 for Isabelle de Lalaing, an aristocrat in Boussu, present-day Belgium. It was made by the so-called Master of Antoine Rolin and is preserved in the national library of France in Paris.

== History ==
The book was made for Isabelle de Lalaing, member of the de Lalaing family and widow of Pierre de Hennin (of the Hénin family), a knight of the Order of the Golden Fleece in the service of the Duke of Burgundy. The family were lords of Boussu in Hainaut, in present-day Belgium, from which the book derives its name. The book was made sometime after her husband's death in 1490, perhaps in Valenciennes. After the death of Isabelle, the book remained in private ownership, passing through several hands until it was acquired by Marc Antoine René de Voyer in the 18th century. Through him, it entered the collections of the Bibliothèque de l'Arsenal in Paris, founded by Marc Antoine René de Voyer. Since 1934, the library is part of the French national library. In 2020, the book was restored and given a new binding. During the restoration, it was discovered that the spine of the book was still sewn with the original thread, an unusual state for such an old book.

== Description ==
The book is richly decorated. The illuminator responsible for the decoration was the so-called Master of Antoine Rolin. The illuminator was active in Hainaut and a follower of the style of Simon Marmion, in a style broadly characterisable as late Flemish manuscript illumination. Influences from the Ghent–Bruges school are apparent in the borders of most books of hours of the Master of Antoine Rolin, though some of the margins in the Book of Hours of Boussu have a more innovative, narrative character. The Hours of Boussu has been described by art historian Anne-Marie Legaré as the most spectacular book of hours made by the Master of Antoine Rolin; the French national library describes it as "one of the most beautiful illuminated manuscripts in the Bibliothèque de l'Arsenal".

It contains 26 full-page miniatures, 40 smaller miniatures and nine historiated initials. All pages have decorated borders, most containing depictions of plants, animals, people and decorative elements on a golden background.

The book can be tied to Isabelle de Lalaing through a depiction of her in one of the miniatures, kneeling at a prie-dieu; it is also decorated with family coat of arms and her motto: Vous seul (French: Only you). The saints Gery and Waltrude are also prominently mentioned; both can be tied to Boussu itself, where Isabelle lived, and neighbouring Mons. The book measures 160 millimetres (6.3 in) by 112 millimetres (4.4 in) and consists of 378 leaves.
