= Siege of Sluis (1604) =

1604 siege and conquest of Sluis by Dutch rebel general Maurice of Nassau

- Part of the Eighty Years' War and the Anglo–Spanish War
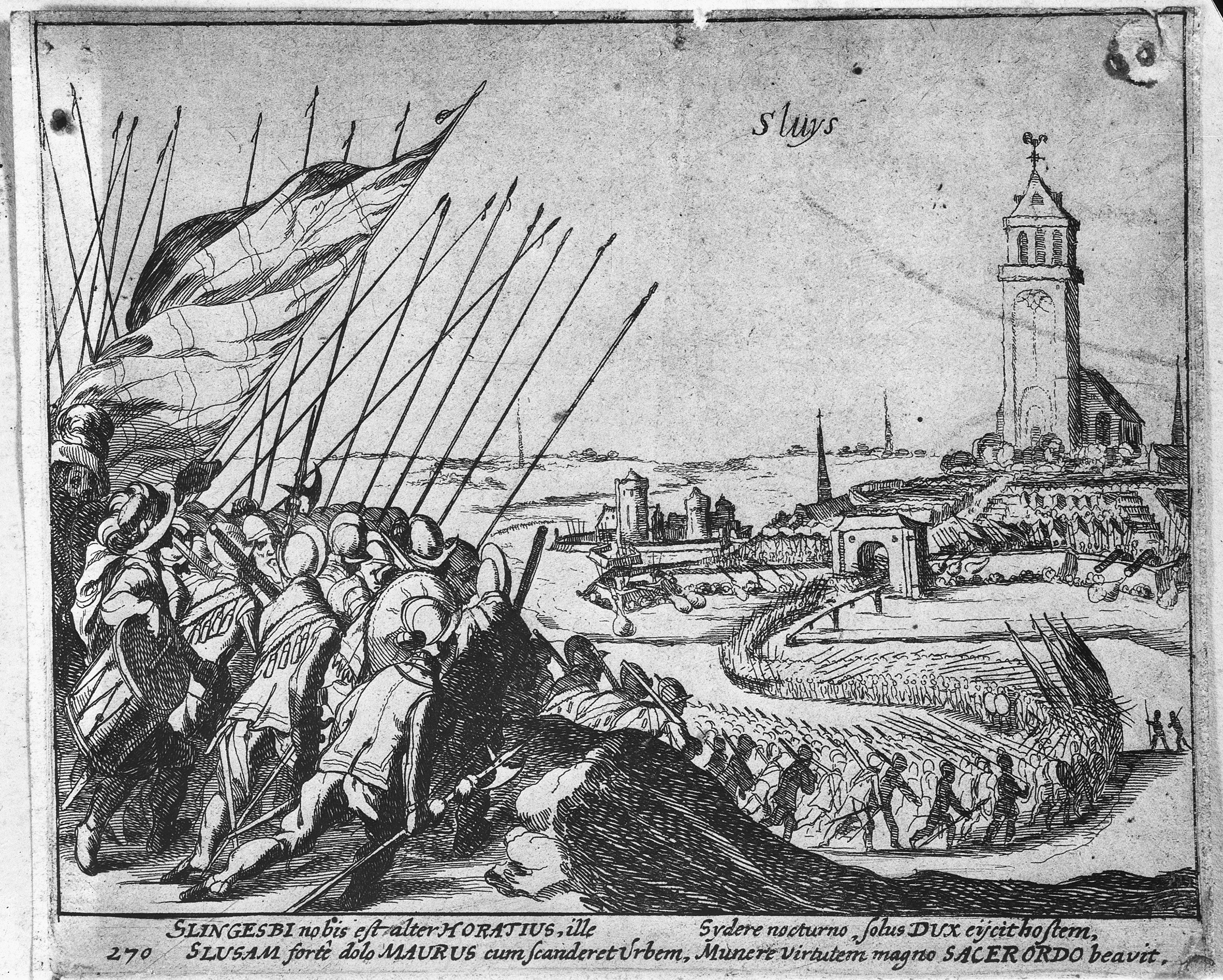
- The capture of Sluis by the Dutch and English army in 1604 from the Atlas Van Loon
Date	19 May – 19 August 1604
Location	Sluis & surrounding region, Spanish Netherlands (present-day Netherlands) 51°18′30″N 3°23′10″E
Result	Anglo-Dutch victory
Territorial changes	Spanish East Flanders annexed by the Dutch

Belligerents
Dutch Republic; England	Spain

Commanders and leaders
(Dutch Republic) Maurice of Orange (England) Horace Vere (England) Charles Fairfax (Dutch Republic) William Louis	(Spain) Ambrogio Spinola (Spain) Luis de Velasco (Spain) Mateo Serrano (surrendered)

Strength
11,000	15,000; 4,200 (Sluis)

Casualties and losses
800 casualties, sick or dead to disease	2,000 casualties, sick or dead to disease 5,800 captured 10 galleys 15 assorted ships 1,400 slaves released

The siege of Sluis (1604), also known as the Sluis campaign or the Battle of the Oostburg Line, was a series of military actions that took place during the Eighty Years' War and the Anglo–Spanish War from 19 May to 19 August 1604. A States and English army under Prince Maurice of Orange and Horace Vere respectively crossed the Scheldt estuary and advanced on land taking Cadzand, Aardenburg, and IJzendijke in the Spanish Netherlands. This soon led to the culmination of the siege of the Spanish-held inland port of Sluis.

Initially it was hoped that with Ostend under siege for three years by the Spanish, an attempted relief by Maurice's army could be achieved. Even though Ostend would finally fall into the hands of the Spanish, Sluis, an important stronghold itself, was eventually captured after tough fighting which included the defeat of a Spanish relief force under Ambrogio Spinola and Luis de Velasco.

== Background ==
In 1600 the Dutch and English Army under the command of Maurice of Nassau and Sir Francis Vere respectively, used Ostend as a base to invade Flanders. After their victory at the Battle of Nieuwpoort an attempt was made to conquer the city of Dunkirk which had been harbouring privateers against the English and Dutch navies. This never happened however as disputes in the Dutch command meant that taking Spanish occupied areas in the rest of the Netherlands took priority as the opportunity arose. Maurice concurred and had his forces evacuated by sea leaving Ostend to be preoccupied by the Spanish.

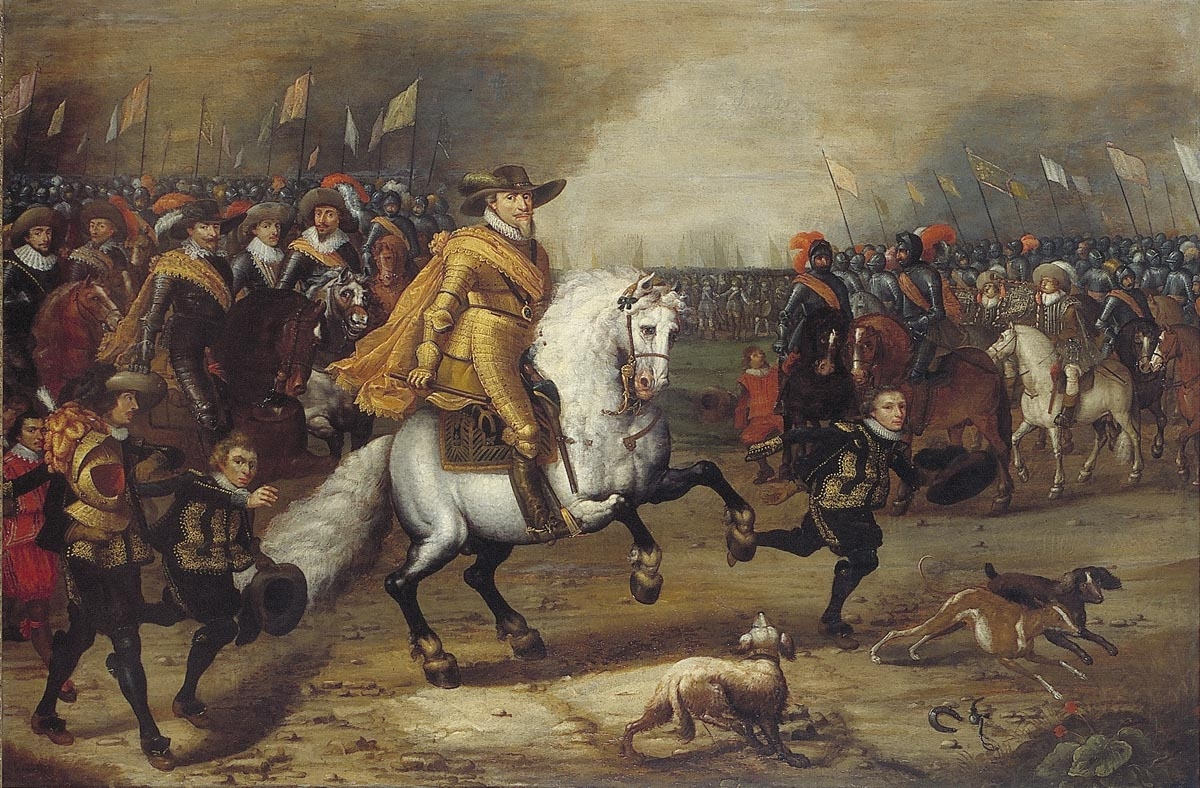
Prince Maurice of Orange

Officials in The Hague were desperately seeking a valuable stronghold that might compensate if Ostend then under siege by 1601 would fall. Originally Maastricht was to be captured during early 1604 but this soon turned to be of little significance in terms of increasing security to merchants and fishing fleets. The prolific Dutch statesman Johan van Oldenbarnevelt knew that with the death of Elizabeth I the year before, the new king of England James I had been approached by the Spanish for peace proposals. Afraid that the new peace would sever the Dutch coastal towns in English hands, given in 1585 as part of the Treaty of Nonsuch, Oldenbarnevelt's attention then soon turned to the Cadzand area south of the Western Scheldt. Here a replacement port could be used and the place chosen was the inland port of Sluis.

Sluis was of strategic value to the States because it protected Zeeland to the north. In addition it provided a bridgehead from which attacks could be made in the future. Being in possession of Sluis would help them to secure the Scheldt, which was on the approach to the important port city of Antwerp and control of the Zwin, which was also the route to Bruges. The Spanish under the Duke of Parma had captured Sluis from the Dutch and English in 1587. After the Anglo Dutch victory over Frederico Spinola's galley fleet at the Battle of the Narrow Seas in 1602 Sluis from then on was under a tight blockade by the Dutch navy. When the surviving Spanish galley fleet under Spinola tried to exit the Sluis roadstead he was defeated and killed in 1603. With the Spanish gallies unable to escape, the town was reinforced as quickly as possible to guard against a possible attack from the south. With the siege of Ostend under way the Spanish made sure that Sluis was comprehensively fortified. In the town itself there was a large garrison of 4,500 Spanish and Italian soldiers and sailors under the command of Don Mateo Serrano. Another 1,400 galley slaves (mostly Turks) and a large number of warships including ten war gallies were also in the town, as were hundreds of civilians who were determined to stay.

== Campaign ==
On 18 April 1604 Maurice had assembled an army at Dordrecht, which embarked at Arnemuiden and Flushing. In total the combined Dutch and English army numbered 11,000 soldiers – Maurice was accompanied by his young brother Frederick Henry who was now second in command after Sir Francis Vere who was convalescing his war wounds as governor of Brielle. The Dutch troops were commanded by his cousins; Counts Ernest Casimir, Louis Gunther, and William of Nassau-Siegen. The whole English contingent numbering near on 4,000 with an additional 600 cavalry was now under the command of Horace Vere, brother of Francis. The other English officers were John Ogle, Edward Harwood, and in command of the cavalry Edward Cecil.

A vast number of vessels had been collected, and the Dutch and English army crossed the Scheldt and on 24 April successfully landed on the opposite shore between Vulpen and Cadzand.

=== Cadzand ===
In the two following days, Hofstede and all the other forts on Cadzand island surrendered to Maurice's army. On the 30th they crossed the channel to Coxie, and captured the forts on that side including the largest – St Catharine's. Ambrogio Spinola, the Spanish commander in charge of besieging Ostend, saw the threat and blocked off the advance to that city.

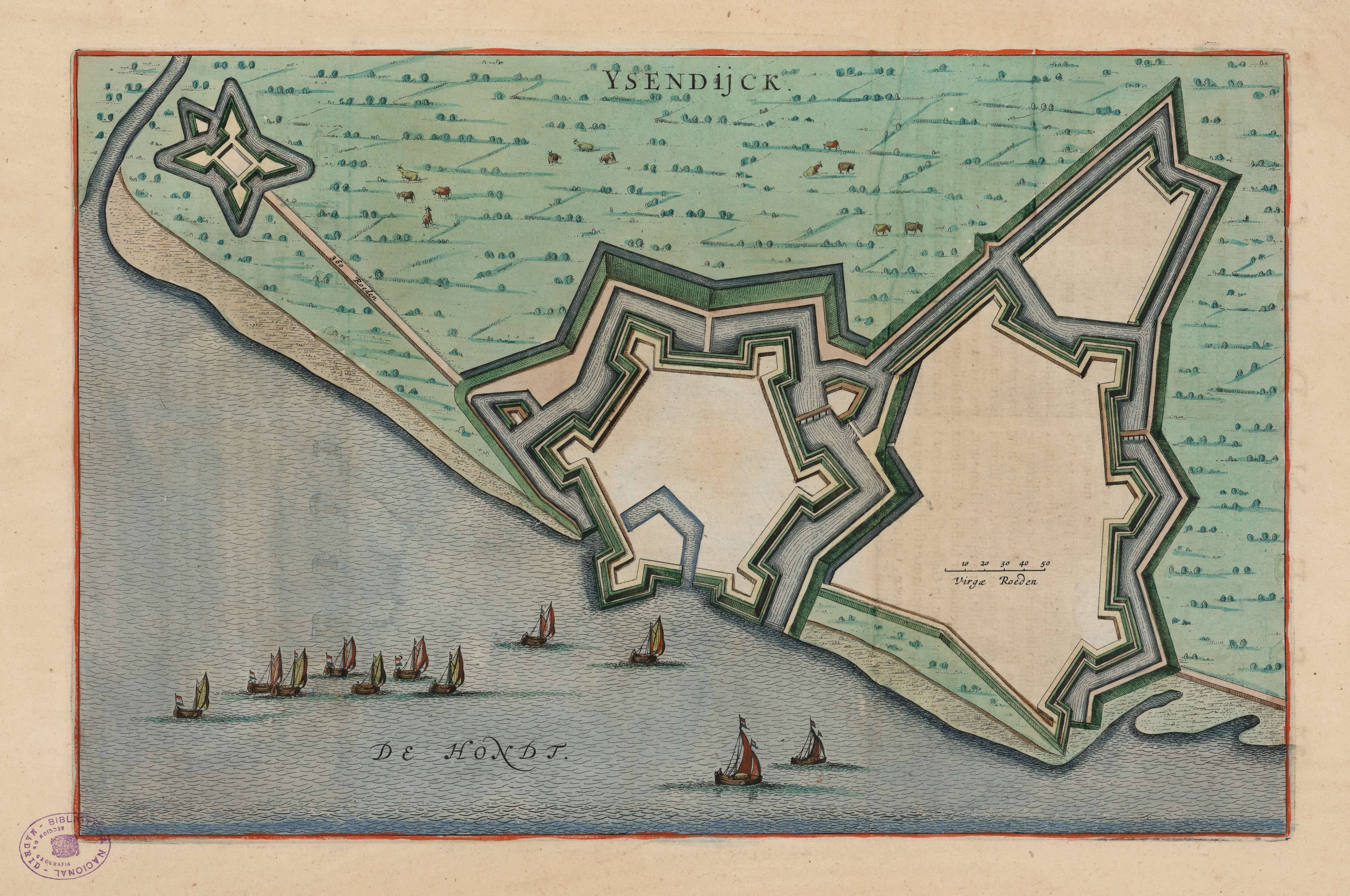
A map of IJzendijke

=== IJzendijke ===
The Dutch and English army then moved forward to the town of IJzendijke a strongly fortified place three leagues to the east of Sluis which consisted of a largely Italian garrison and invested it by 6 May. Before a siege could take place, a force of 2,000 well disciplined Spanish troops moved down in boats from Sluis to Cadzand for the purpose of surprising the force. Six hundred landed and smashed through the Dutch defences but could advance no further when a few English and Scotch companies held firm. By hard fighting they were able to drive back the Spanish to their boats many of which were sunk and the rest retreated.

Maurice continued with the siege of the place and sent his own trumpeter to summon the garrison to surrender. The answer came from a musket shot targeted at the trumpeter who was shot in the head and killed instantly. Maurice enraged at this violation of the laws of war dug his line of trenches further towards the town. The next day the garrison numbering six hundred capitulated and gave up the musketeer who had murdered the trumpeter.

=== Aardenburg ===
After leaving a small garrison in IJzendijke the army marched off again two days later and soon appeared before the Spanish held town of Aardenburg. This was another large fortified town four miles south of Sluis with a garrison of 500 men. On approach of the army and seeing an overwhelming force, the Spanish had no choice but to also surrender. The capture was vital with access to four or five miles of two parallel streams both navigable to Sluis thus an important position for the investment of the town. Soon after Dutch cavalry scoured the country to the very walls of Ghent and Bruges.

=== Battle of the Oostberg Line ===
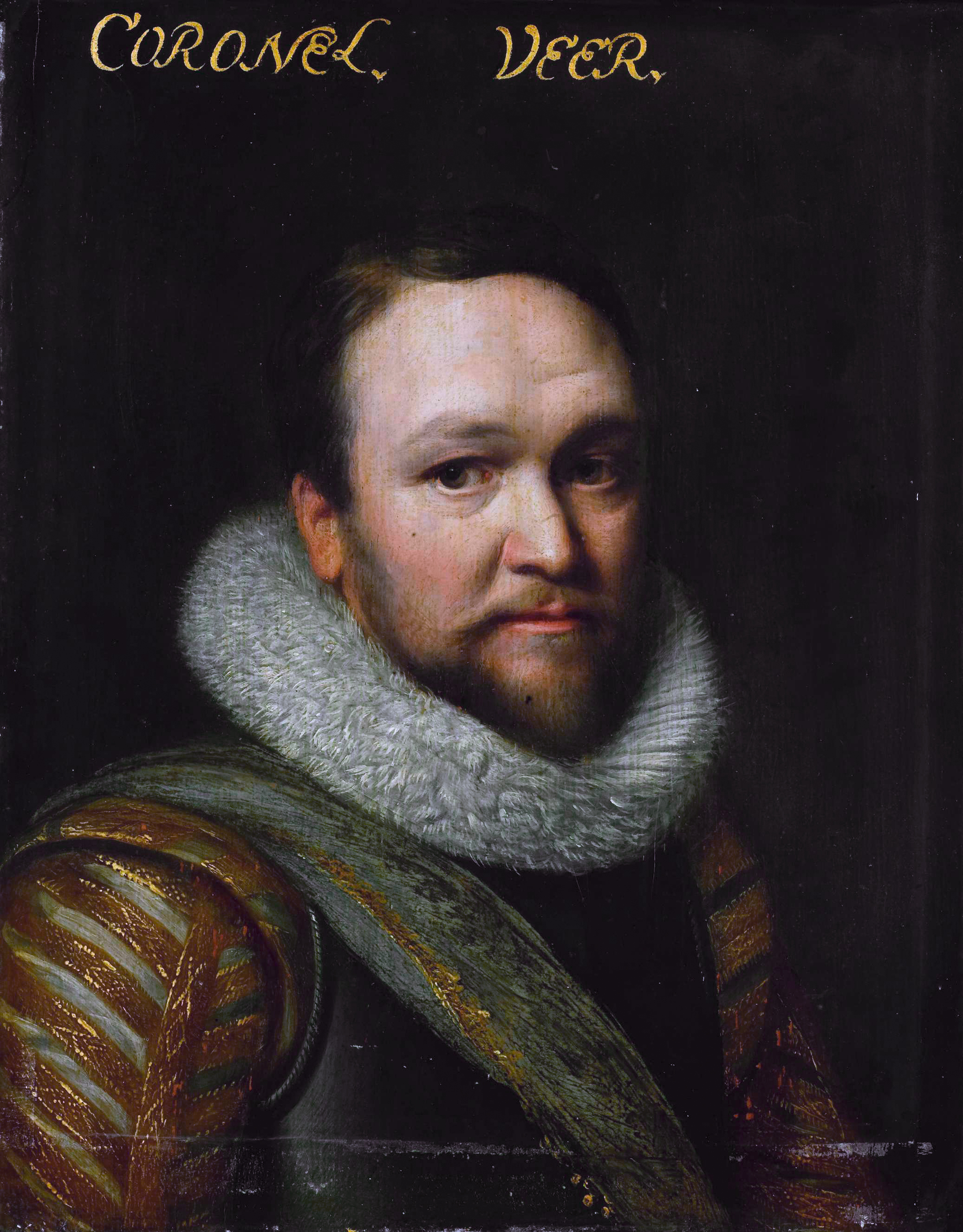
Horace Vere who led the English contingent

Maurice's objective was to get possession of all the military posts in the vicinity before laying siege to Sluis. Before a close siege could be formed it was however necessary to outmanoeuvre the efforts to relieve the garrison, not only of Don Luis de Velasco, the Spanish general of horse. Velasco had entrenched his force of 2,000 men in a narrow pass, in front of Damme, the town between Sluis and Bruges in a position known as the Oostburg Line.

On 17 May having left garrisons in IJzendijke and Aardenburg the Anglo-Dutch force advanced against the Spaniards. Count Ernest led the vanguard, with the cavalry under Marcellus Bacx, but they were taken at a disadvantage and Spanish resistance soon toughened. As a result, the Dutch suddenly fell backwards down the stream to a point which Velasco, who had been in pursuit, had discovered it to be fordable at low water.

Sir Horace Vere, seeing that the Spanish were gaining ground reacted with swift speed. He selected 100 pikemen and 200 musketeers from his brother Francis's regiment, and placed them under the command of Sir Charles Fairfax. A second detachment of 400 men, under Sir John Ogle, was to follow and 200 of Cecil's cavalry came up in support. The way was narrow, and on either side there were swamps and stagnant waters, where the sea had been let in over the polder lands. Fairfax led his men to the attack with great vigour and after a sharp engagement, he forced the Spanish to retire behind their entrenchments, and followed them so closely that they were routed. Many plunged into the swamps and flooded polders, some escaped but some drowned or were trapped. More of Ogle's men joined the fight to complete the rout.

The Spanish under Velasco had been driven off and casualties were heavy. They numbered 423 killed, wounded, or drowned with another 400 prisoners being taken. Maurice gave the honour of this hard fought battle to the English companies and praised Horace.

Maurice's whole army forded the stream while the fighting continued further up stream. The Spaniards who feared to be cut off soon scattered away to Damme.

=== Siege of Sluis ===
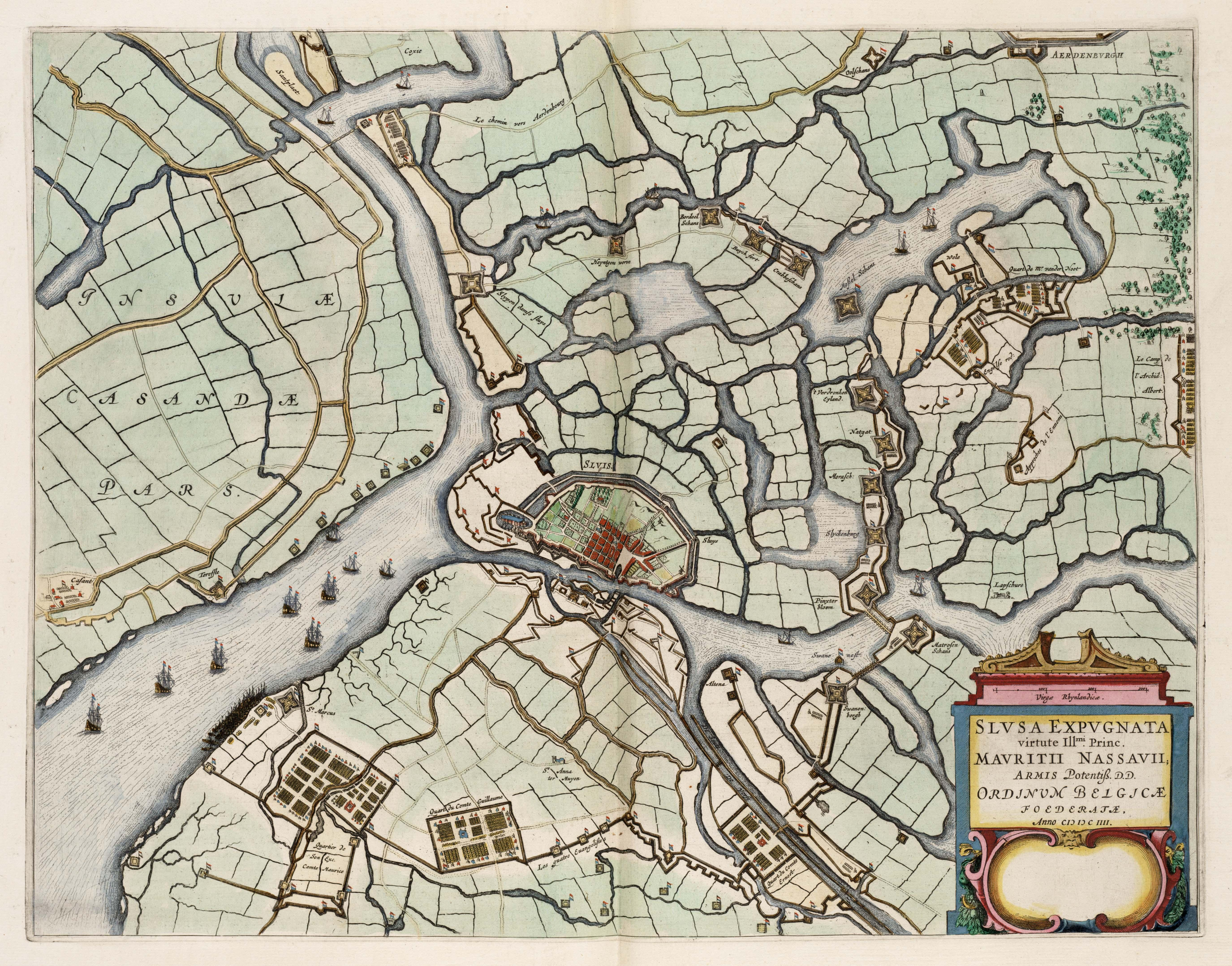
The Anglo-Dutch army at the siege of Sluis from the Atlas Van Loon

By 23 May Maurice's army were now in complete control of the streams. The Spanish held fort of St. Joris with a garrison of 300 men, armed with nine guns, was now isolated and soon surrendered which meant that Sluis could be besieged proper. Colonel Van der Node, who had been governor of Ostend, crossed the Zwin at low water with thirty companies, of which ten were English. They fortified a spot selected by Maurice, opposite to Sluis. The approach from Bruges and Damme was thus commanded, and the investment of the town was completed.

In the end of May the Archduke ordered Spinola to relieve Sluis – a priority over the siege of Ostend. Spinola albeit grudgingly complied and sent a force of 4,000 men with a convoy of provisions for the beleaguered garrison. This force however was routed, and all the wagons of provisions were captured in a series of well-laid ambushes.

The besiegers siege-works meanwhile were fortified with trenches and square sconces, both for protection against sorties from the town and attacks from outside. Maurice himself was encamped on the north side, with Count Ernest on the other side of the Zwin, Count William on the east, and Colonel Van der Node and Horace Vere occupied the flooded lands with a large flotilla of armed vessels drawing little water.

By the end of June it was apparent that the logistical and strategic process of taking Sluis by the Dutch and English now took more priority than the relief of Ostend. Ostend was by now a heap of ruins and was of no value to the Dutch any more. Sluis however with its town and inland port virtually intact was a good replacement for them.

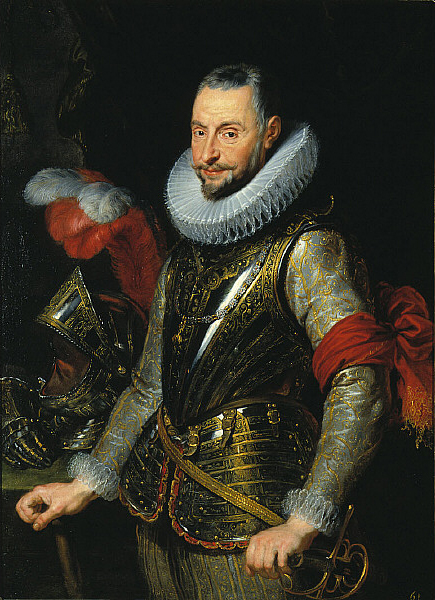
Ambrogio Spinola, the Spanish commander

In July, Spinola himself made another attempt to relieve Sluis under orders from the Archduke saying that Spain could not afford to lose another Flemish port. On the 28th he encamped between Bruges and Damme, with 10,000 men and 600 wagons laden with supplies and ammunition. He thence advanced passing Ardenburg towards the quarters of Van der Node. His objective was to reach the town by a wide causeway which was still open. Maurice however saw the plan and set a large force to work, and in forty-eight hours he had dug a trench across, which effectually stopped the passage. He then mounted several guns between the quarters of Van der Node and Count William, and opened a heavy and continuous fire on the camp of Spinola. By now hunger and infectious diseases took their toll on the civilians and soldiers alike in Sluis, but eventually news of the Spanish relief force was on the way and much hope was somewhat restored.

On the evening of 6 August Spinola made an attack on Count William's quarters, and there was a desperate conflict in the trenches. At length the Spanish were forced to retreat after a Dutch column came and surprised the flank of the assailants causing the loss of some 700 men.

On the 18th after two months of trying to relieve Sluis, Spinola gave up hope and marched away dispirited and returned to resume the siege of Ostend.

The garrison of Sluis was now reduced to great straits by famine, the 4,000 half-starved garrison troops, some of them scarcely able to walk could not hold out any longer. On 20 August 1604, upon hearing the news of the retreat of Spinola and Velasco, Governor Serrano had no choice but to surrender the city to Maurice.

The garrison were allowed to depart with the honours of war and the same terms were accorded to the inhabitants both in secular and religious matters. The Spanish soldiers numbering 4,000 many of them sick marched out with drums beating and colours flying. Sixty died of exhaustion as they attempted to march out. Besides those troops were nearly fourteen hundred starving galley slaves, mostly Turks.

== Aftermath ==
The next day the stadholder took possession bestowing the nominal government of the place upon his brother Frederick Henry, Prince of Orange. On top of the capture of the town, a vast haul had been captured, including ten galleys which the Spanish had failed to scuttle and fifteen merchant ships with most of the goods. In addition a large store of munitions, 84 brass and 24 iron guns, were captured. The Dutch and English garrisoned the town and subsequently strengthened the place in case of a Spanish counterattack. Losses amongst the Dutch and English were light – Sir John Ogle had lost an eye during the Oostberg battle. Many suffered from disease – Count Louis of Nassau died of fever a few days after the surrender. News of the capture of Sluis was celebrated in England - in London at St Katharine Docks vessels fired salutes in honour of the victory.

The Turkish galley slaves that had marched out were repatriated by the Dutch to the Barbary coast without a ransom. From the good that came from this deed they signed a treaty with the Bey of Algiers on trade.

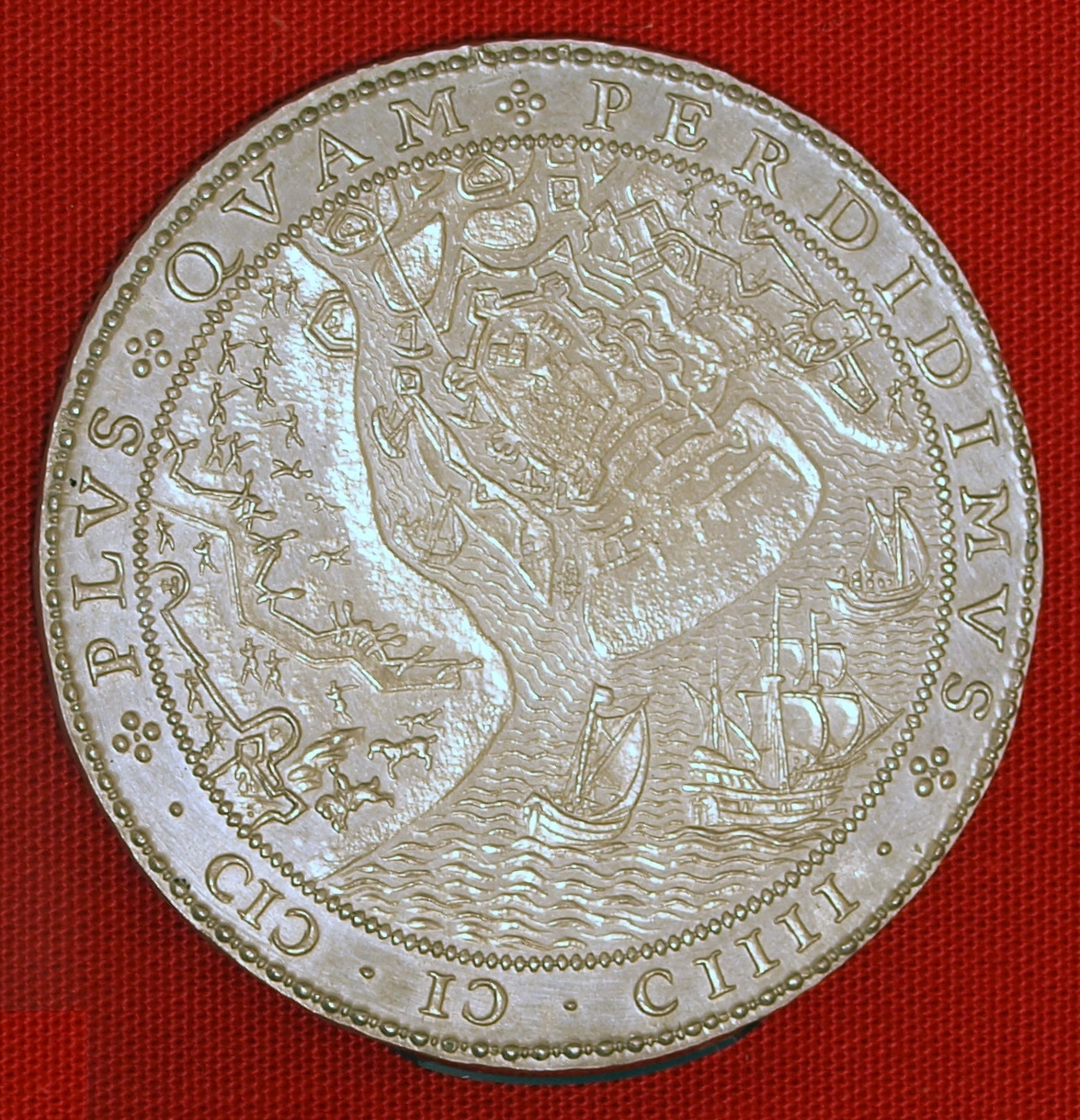
Dutch coin celebrating the capture of Sluis in 1604

On 22 September Daniel de Hartaing then surrendered Ostend as ordered by Maurice and by agreement from the Hague; the city was nothing but a mass of ruins. The Spanish entered the city of Ostend, after a three-year siege, the garrison of less than 3,000 were allowed the honour of retaining their arms and armour. On both sides tens of thousands were killed, sick or succumbed to sickness and the town was completely destroyed.

The Spanish strategic intent to wrest from the Dutch their only military port in the western part of the North Sea, was offset by the conquest of Sluis and Cadzand by Maurice's army, which thereafter now was a new base of naval operations for the Dutch. With Sluis gone so too had the benefit of a good haven for Spanish galleys, a conveniently situated place for an invasion of the United Provinces which would have enabled the Spanish to disrupt Dutch trade. South of Sluis a line of fortifications was put in place – access to the Zwin was shut off, town walls were strengthened along with fortresses on both sides of the front. In that time, around Damme the 7-star-shaped fortifications were built and thus served as a defence bastion against Bruges.

This was to be the penultimate set piece battle of the Anglo-Spanish war before the surrender of Ostend where England would end its official involvement. Due to a clever piece of wording in the Treaty of London however the Dutch could still recruit English and Scottish soldiers but in the pay of the States as volunteers.

The Spanish attempted to recapture Sluis in 1606. In a night raid the attackers managed to force an entrance but were beaten off by half-dressed English soldiers. The men and officers they caught and killed also had money and valuables which the English seized along with the arms and equipment.

Sluis and its surrounding towns remained in Dutch hands for the rest of the war and are still part of the Netherlands today. Sluis is said by some to be the most Flemish town in the Netherlands.

=== Notable participants ===
Myles Standish, who would later be a military advisor for the Plymouth Colony sailing on the Mayflower, fought during this campaign.

== See also ==
- Dutch Revolt
- List of governors of the Spanish Netherlands
- Siege of Ostend
- Siege of Sluis (1587)

== Bibliography ==
- Allen, Paul C (2000). Philip III and the Pax Hispanica, 1598–1621: The Failure of Grand Strategy. Yale University Press. ISBN 0-300-07682-7.
- Belleroche, Edward (2012). The Siege of Ostend; Or the New Troy, 1601–1604. General Books. ISBN 978-1151203199.
- Bicheno, Hugh (2012). Elizabeth's Sea Dogs: How England's Mariners Became the Scourge of the Seas. Conway. ISBN 978-1-84486-174-3.
- Borman, Tracy (1997). Sir Francis Vere in the Netherlands, 1589–1603: A Re-evaluation of His Career as Sergeant Major General of Elizabeth I's Troops. University of Hull.
- Dalton, Charles (2012). Life and Times of General Sir Edward Cecil, Viscount Wimbledon, Colonel of an English Regiment in the Dutch Service, 1605–1631, and One of His Majesty. HardPress. ISBN 9781407753157.
- Duerloo, Luc (2013). Dynasty and Piety: Archduke Albert (1598–1621) and Habsburg Political Culture in an Age of Religious Wars. Ashgate Publishing, Ltd. ISBN 9781409483069.
- Duffy, Christopher (2013). Siege Warfare: The Fortress in the Early Modern World 1494–1660 Volume 1 of Siege warfare. Routledge. ISBN 9781136607875.
- Edmundson, George (2013). History of Holland. Cambridge University Press. ISBN 9781107660892.
- Fissel, Mark Charles (2001). English warfare, 1511–1642; Warfare and history. London, UK: Routledge. ISBN 978-0-415-21481-0.
- Israel, Jonathan (1997). Conflicts of Empires: Spain, the Low Countries and the Struggle for World Supremacy, 1585–1713. Continuum. ISBN 9780826435538.
- Jamieson, Alan G (2013). Lords of the Sea: A History of the Barbary Corsairs. Reaktion Books. ISBN 9781861899460.
- Jaques, Tony (2006). Dictionary of Battles and Sieges: A Guide to 8500 Battles from Antiquity Through the Twenty-first Century. Greenwood Press. ISBN 978-0313335365.
- Jenks, Tudor (1905). Captain Myles Standish. New York: The Century Co. OCLC 3000476.
- Limm, P (2014). The Dutch Revolt 1559 – 1648, Seminar Studies. Routledge. ISBN 9781317880585.
- Markham, C. R (2007). The Fighting Veres: Lives Of Sir Francis Vere And Sir Horace Vere. Kessinger Publishing. ISBN 978-1432549053.
- Martin & Parker, Colin & Geoffrey (1989). The Spanish Armada: Revised Edition. Penguin Books. ISBN 1-901341-14-3.
- Prak, Maarten (2005). The Dutch Republic in the Seventeenth Century: The Golden Age. Cambridge University Press. ISBN 9780521843522.
- Simoni, Anna E. C. (2003). Ostend Story: Early Tales of the Great Siege and the Mediating Role of Henrick Van Haestens (III ed.). Hes & De Graaf Pub B V. ISBN 9789061941590.
- van Nimwegen, Olaf (2010). The Dutch Army and the Military Revolutions, 1588–1688 Volume 31 of Warfare in History Series. Boydell & Brewer. ISBN 9781843835752.
