= Newsletter =

Periodical opinion or news publication

A newsletter is a printed or electronic report or news concerning the activities of a business or an organization, that is sent to its members, customers, employees or other subscribers, or a communication containing individuals' personal opinions or interests.

Newsletters generally contain one main topic of interest to its recipients and may be considered grey literature. E-newsletters are delivered electronically via e-mail and can be viewed as spamming if e-mail marketing is sent unsolicited.

The newsletter, sometimes a periodical, is the most common form of serial publication. About two-thirds of newsletters are internal publications, aimed towards employees and volunteers, while about one-third are external publications, aimed towards advocacy or special interest groups.

== History ==
In ancient Rome, newsletters were exchanged between officials or friends. By the Middle Ages, they were exchanged between merchant families. Trader's newsletters covered various topics such as the availability and pricing of goods, political news, and other events that would influence trade. These commercial newsletters were in effect, the first "serious" outlet for news publishing, from which evolved newspapers. Extracts from Fugger family newsletters have been translated and published as a historical source.

The first full "newspaper" was Relation of Strasbourg, printed in 1609 by Johann Carolus. Many rivals soon followed, such as the German Avisa Relation oder Zeitung and the Dutch Nieuwe Tijdingen. By the end of the 17th century, several newspapers were established all across Europe, and were often translated into other languages. By the late 17th century, several governments were censoring newspapers, which harmed their development. Wars, like the Thirty Years' War, also imposed restrictions on trade, which could lead to shortage of paper in addition to censorship.

Government censorship remains in effect in several countries to this day, although several countries now have laws guaranteeing freedom of the press.

=== Modernity ===
Modern newsletters are usually created and distributed electronically by companies, organizations or individuals.

Newsletter marketing is a form of direct-to-consumer advertising. This is used by companies that want to send information directly to potential and existing customers. When received unsolicited, they can be seen as spam.

Newsletters are also used by organizations to inform their members of ongoing developments.

The New York Times noted in 2014 that new ways people are consuming media online have led to a resurgence of e-mail newsletters, some of which are distributed exclusively via email and some that are published on websites. In 2025, Inc. magazine reported a new email newsletter boom amongst startups and tech companies.

== Production ==
Many paper newsletters are letter-size pamphlets, sometimes made of side- or corner-stapled letter-size paper, sometimes of saddle-stitched (stapled) tabloid paper.

Until the early 20th century, newsletters were generally produced by letterpress. The development of spirit duplicators and mimeograph machines in the early 20th century made short-run reproduction more economical. In the 1960s, xerographic photocopying became ubiquitous.
