= Charles Emmanuel =

Charles Emmanuel may refer to:

- Charles Emmanuel de Savoie, Duke of Nemours (1567–1595)
- Charles Emmanuel I, Duke of Savoy (1562–1630)
- Charles Emmanuel II, Duke of Savoy (1634–1675)
- Charles Emmanuel III, King of Sardinia (1701–1773)
- Charles Emmanuel IV, King of Sardinia (1751–1819)
- Charles McArther Emmanuel, U.S. citizen and the son of Charles Taylor, former president of Liberia
- Charles Emmanuel, Prince of Carignano (1770–1800)
- Charles Emmanuel, Landgrave of Hesse-Rotenburg (1746–1812)
- Charles I Emmanuel, 1st Prince de Gavre (1694–1773)
