= List of protected heritage sites in Boussu =

This table shows an overview of the protected heritage sites in the Walloon town Boussu. This list is part of Belgium's national heritage.

Object	Year/architect	Town/section	Address	Coordinates	Number^{?}	Image
Ensemble formed by the church of Saint Géry and the old stately chapel Boussu ^{(nl)} ^{(fr)}		Boussu		50.433879°N 3.794797°E	53014-CLT-0001-01 Info	Ensemble gevormd door de kerk Saint Géry en de oude statige kapel te Boussu
Presbytery of Hornu in Boussu ^{(nl)} ^{(fr)}		Boussu		50.433406°N 3.827138°E	53014-CLT-0003-01 Info	
Ensemble of the buildings' Le Grand-Hornu "and the ensemble formed by these and the surrounding area ^{(nl)} ^{(fr)}		Boussu		50.435531°N 3.839172°E	53014-CLT-0004-01 Info	Ensemble van de gebouwen "Le Grand-Hornu" en het ensemble gevormd door deze en het omliggende terrein
The facades and roofs of Home Guerin (old building), the pavilion in the Rue Dorzee and the entire bandstand and the park and public plaza ^{(nl)} ^{(fr)}		Boussu		50.433327°N 3.797084°E	53014-CLT-0008-01 Info	
The ruins of the castle and its outbuildings Boussu and the ensemble of the ruins and their surroundings ^{(nl)} ^{(fr)}		Boussu		50.437146°N 3.795043°E	53014-CLT-0010-01 Info	De ruines van kasteel Boussu en zijn bijgebouwen alsook het ensemble van de ruïnes en hun omgeving
The walls and roof of the building concierge, rue Leon Figue n ° 17 in Boussu ^{(nl)} ^{(fr)}		Boussu		50.432967°N 3.794116°E	53014-CLT-0011-01 Info	
Trees on the rue de Caraman n ° 91 in Boussu ^{(nl)} ^{(fr)}		Boussu		50.433978°N 3.785912°E	53014-CLT-0012-01 Info	
The Grand Hornu Workers' Housing Estate in Boussu, including the “château” (manager's residence), the cobblestone streets, and the squares (Architectural Complex). Establishment of a buffer zone around this architectural complex to preserve its surroundings (Buffer Zone). (+COLFONTAINE/Wasmes and QUAREGNON/Wasmuel)		Boussu		50.434195°N 3.839721°E	53014-CLT-0013-01 Info	
The building and covered public passageway (facades and roofs) housing the Justice of the Peace, located at 2 Rue Neuve in Boussu	1825	Boussu Boussu	Rue Neuve, 2	50.433873°N 3.795507°E	53014-CLT-0019-01 Info	
The interior including the mausoleums and the images of the funeral chapel of the Seigneurs ^{(nl)} ^{(fr)}		Boussu		50.433907°N 3.795078°E	53014-PEX-0001-01 Info	Het interieur met inbegrip van de mausolea en de beeltenissen van de grafkapel van de Seigneurs
The old industrial buildings of Le Grand-Hornu ^{(nl)} ^{(fr)}		Boussu		50.435531°N 3.839172°E	53014-PEX-0002-01 Info	De oude industriële gebouwen van Le Grand-Hornu
The gatehouse of the old castle of Boussu and the archaeological site for the part of the Renaissance ^{(nl)} ^{(fr)}		Boussu		50.437146°N 3.795043°E	53014-PEX-0003-01 Info	Het poortgebouw van het oude kasteel van Boussu en de archeologische site voor het deel uit de Renaissance

== See also ==
- List of protected heritage sites in Hainaut (province)
- Boussu
