= Lodewijk Verreycken =

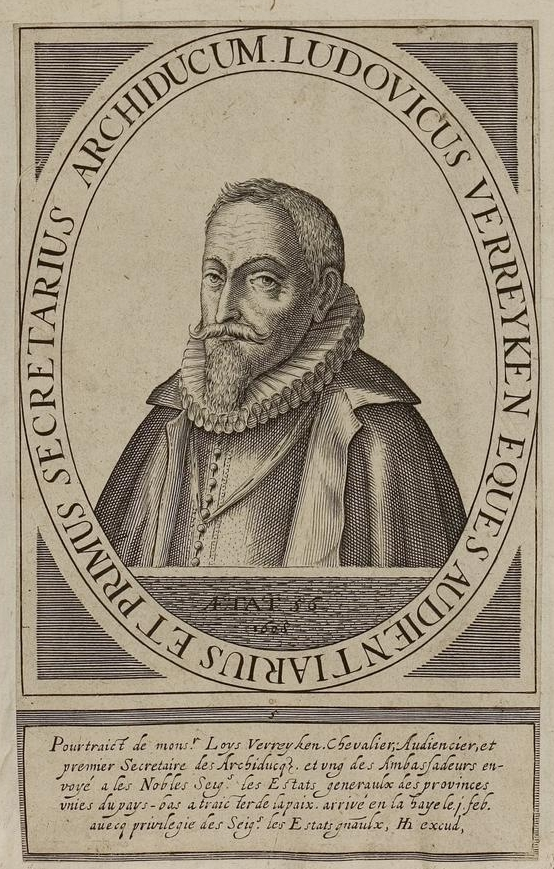
- Portrait of Lodewijk Verreycken

First secretary and audiencier
- In office 1583–1619
- Governor General: Archduke Albert
- Succeeded by: Lodewijk Frans Verreycken

Personal details
- Born: 1552
- Died: 23 October 1621 (aged 68–69)
- Spouse: Louise Micault
- Children: Lodewijk Frans Verreycken

Lodewijk Verreycken (in French language sources referred to as Louis Verreycken) (1552 - 23 October 1621), Lord of Impden, Sart, Ruart, Hamme was secretary of the Council of State of the Habsburg Netherlands and audiencier of the Privy Council of the Habsburg Netherlands. He played an important role as a diplomat and emissary of the Spanish crown and the Habsburg Netherlands in various peace negotiations in Europe, including the Peace of Vervins with France and the Twelve Years' Truce between Spain and the Dutch Republic.

== Career ==
He was born in 1552 as the son of Pieter Verreycken and Catharina van den Daele. The Verreyckens family were of humble origin, originating from the Meierij van 's-Hertogenbosch. They had climbed the social ladder, bought lordships and acquired letters of nobility. Lodewijk's father was the former audiencier of the Privy Council of the Habsburg Netherlands. His brother-in-law Pieter dOverloepe, who had succeeded his father-in-law Pieter Verreycken had taken over from Pieter Verreycken in 1552 and remained in office until 1578. Since Lodewijk's father, Pieter Verreycken, had been appointed audiencier by Charles V, Holy Roman Emperor in 1538, the position would remain in the Verreycken family for more than a century and a half until 1680, a clear example of nepotism common in the government bureaucracy.

Lodewijk was first appointed by Philip II of Spain on 4 May 1583, but rose to pre-eminence under Archduke Albert. Together with Jean Richardot he took part in the negotiations leading to the Peace of Vervins between France and the Habsburgs. In early 1600 he undertook a peace mission to England, but without immediate result. Rowland Whyte described his reception at court by Queen Elizabeth in detail.

He was also a member of the delegation that negotiated the Twelve Years' Truce of 1609–1621 between the Dutch Republic and the Habsburgs.

He was named treasurer of the Order of the Golden Fleece in 1611, and was knighted in 1596. His son Lodewijk Frans Verreycken became 1st Baron of Bonlez.

His will is dated 12 May 1620. He died in Brussels on 23 October 1621. His tomb is in the Chapel Church.
