= Lodewijk Frans Verreycken, 1st Baron of Bonlez =

Lodewijk Frans Verreycken
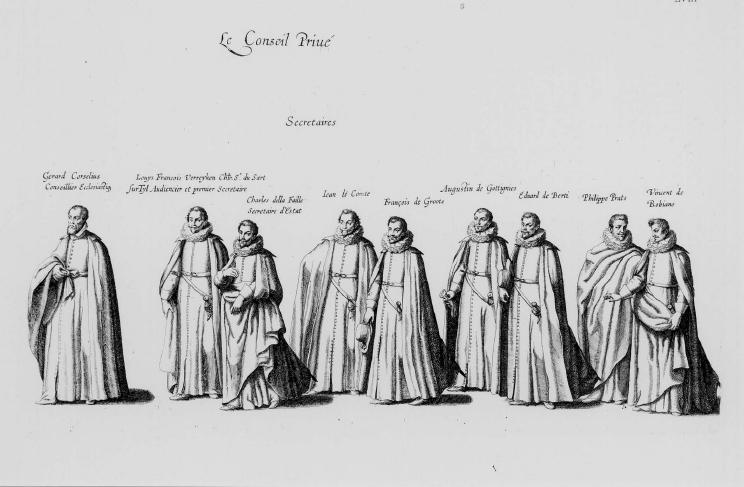
- The Privy Council of the Habsburg Netherlands in the funeral cortege of Archduke Albert; Verreycken second from left

first secretary and audiencier
- In office 1620–1654
- Governors General: Isabella Clara Eugenia (1621–1633); Cardinal-Infante Ferdinand of Austria (1633–1641); Francisco de Melo (1641–1644); Marquis of Castel Rodrigo (1644–1647); Archduke Leopold Wilhelm of Austria (1647–1656)
- Preceded by: Lodewijk Verreycken
- Succeeded by: Charles Verreycken, 1st Baron of Impden

Personal details
- Born: 1588
- Died: 6 May 1654 (aged 65–66)
- Resting place: Chapel Church, Brussels
- Spouse(s): Anna Maria van Busleyden, Lady of Rode (died 26 March 1639)
- Children: Charles Verreycken, 1st Baron of Impden
- Parent(s): Lodewijk Verreycken ] and Louise Micault

Lodewijk Frans Verreycken (in French language sources referred to as Louis-François Verreycken) (1588–1654) was audiencier of the Privy Council of the Habsburg Netherlands and first secretary of the Council of State of the Habsburg Netherlands. He succeeded his father, Lodewijk Verreycken, in 1620 and served under five successive governor-generals of the Habsburg Netherlands.

In 1643 he became the 1st Baron of Bonlez.

His granddaughter Anne-Louise Verreycken married Philippe-Louis de Hénin, 7th Count of Bossu and they became the parents of Cardinal Thomas d'Alsace

He died on 6 May 1654 and was succeeded in office by his son, Charles.
