= Joannes-Henricus de Franckenberg =

His Eminence Joannes-Henricus von Frankenberg
- Cardinal, Archbishop of Mechelen; Primate of the Low Countries
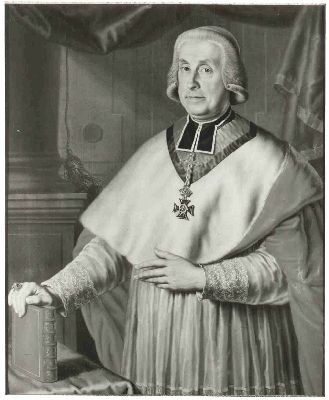
- Church: Roman Catholic
- Archdiocese: Mechelen
- Appointed: 28 May 1759
- In office: 1759–1801
- Predecessor: Thomas Philip Wallrad de Hénin-Liétard d'Alsace
- Successor: Jean-Armand de Bessuéjouls Roquelaure

Orders
- Ordination: 10 August 1749
- Consecration: 15 July 1759 by Christoph Anton Migazzi
- Created cardinal: 1 June 1778 by Pius VI
- Rank: Cardinal-Priest

Personal details
- Born: 18 September 1726 Groß-Glogau, Silesia, Kingdom of Prussia (present-day Głogów, Poland)
- Died: 11 June 1804 (aged 77) Breda, Netherlands

Johann Heinrich, Graf von Frankenberg (18 September 1726 – 11 June 1804) was Archbishop of Mechelen, Primate of the Low Countries, and a cardinal. He signed as de Franckenberg and as van Franckenberg.

== Early life ==
Franckenberg was born in Groß-Glogau, Silesia, into an ancient family devotedly attached to the Habsburg monarchy of Austria, and which remained so after the conquest of Silesia by Frederick II of Prussia in 1740. Although he was the sole male heir of his family and assured of the protection of Empress Maria Theresa, he decided, when quite young, to become a priest. He attended the Jesuit college of his native city, went later to the University of Breslau, and thence to the German College at Rome, where he obtained the degrees of Doctor of Theology, and of Canon law, and was ordained priest on 10 August 1749.

On his return to Austria, he was made coadjutor to the Bishop of Görz in Carniola (1750–54), dean of the collegiate church of All Saints at Prague (1754), and later of that of Saints Cosmas and Damian at Alt-Bunzlau in Bohemia (1756).

On 27 May 1759, Franckenberg was appointed Archbishop of Mechelen and Primate of the Low Countries. In this office, Franckenberg frequently clashed with government ministers who he felt overstepped into ecclesiastical jurisdiction. He repeatedly refused their requests for him to grant Lenten dispensations.

Maria Theresa sought to have Franckenberg made Archbishop of Vienna, and in 1778 exerted herself to the uttermost to obtain for him the cardinal's hat.

The accession of Joseph II brought further conflict between Franckenberg and the secular authorities. The political philosophy of Josephinism asserted the supremacy of the state over the church, which Franckenberg resisted as an encroachment. The ex-Jesuits Feller and Dedoyar criticized Franckenberg, however, for the mildness of his resistance.

In 1786, the emperor founded the General Seminary at Leuven, intended for ecclesiastical reform and the suppression of ultramontanism. Bishops were ordered to close their diocesan seminaries and send the students to the new institution. Conflict broke out, as the seminarians considered the teaching there to be heretical, and they soon abandoned the seminary.

In response, Joseph II summoned Franckenberg to Vienna, and demanded his help in controlling the students. Franckenberg signed a rather equivocal statement, conceding the authority of the imperial decrees about the seminary, but reserving the right to appeal to the emperor in cases where he believed souls to be in danger.

After returning to the Austrian Netherlands, however, Franckenberg announced that his conscience would not permit him to agree with the founding of the General Seminary. He maintained this position going forward despite imperial threats, issuing a "Declaration" condemning the doctrines taught in the seminary.

The country was already disturbed by insurrectionary movements, and the government was obliged to close the General Seminary. It was too late, however, to repress the rebellious agitation. The government sought, therefore, to make the cardinal responsible for it, and wished to place him under arrest. From his place of refuge, the cardinal protested against the accusation: "I take heaven and earth to witness", said he, "that I have had no share or influence whatever in this insurrection. The entire Netherlands will bear witness to this fact and do me justice in this respect." The government, finding it necessary to abandon the criminal process it had begun against the cardinal, exhibited a conciliatory temper.

In the meantime, however, the French Revolution broke out. The new administration found him friendly, and he was henceforth officially a member of the States-General. At the same time he held aloof from purely political discussions and confined himself to recommending political union. He received with submission and respect the re-establishment of the Austrian government, to which he had always been attached. On the arrival of the French he had to undergo new trials. He refused the pension the government offered him in compensation for the suppression of his revenue, declared his opposition to the oath exacted of the clergy, and finally was expelled from the Southern Netherlands (1797).

== Retirement ==
He retired to Emmerich am Rhein in Prussia, where, aged, sick, and poor, he lived on the charity of his flock, and continued to warn them against those ecclesiastics who had taken the oath. His apostolic courage and his constancy in these trials elicited solemn eulogies from both Pope Pius VI and Pope Pius VII. In deference to the pope's request and to render possible the execution of the concordat, he resigned the Archbishopric of Mechelen on 20 November 1801.

Driven from Emmerich by King Frederick William III of Prussia at the insistence of the French government, which regarded him as a conspirator, he retired to Borken in the Prince-Bishopric of Münster (1801), and, after the suppression of this principality, to Breda, where he died. His courage, self-abnegation, and patience in the face of persecution and adversity make him one of the noblest figures of the Catholic episcopate during the 18th century.

Catholic Church titles
Preceded by Thomas-Philippe d'Alcase	11th Archbishop of Mechelen	Succeeded by Jean-Armand de Bessuéjouls Roquelaure
