= Jean-Armand de Bessuéjouls Roquelaure =

French Roman-Catholic prelate

His Excellency Jean-Armand de Bessuéjouls Roquelaure
- Archbishop of Mechelen; Primate of Belgium
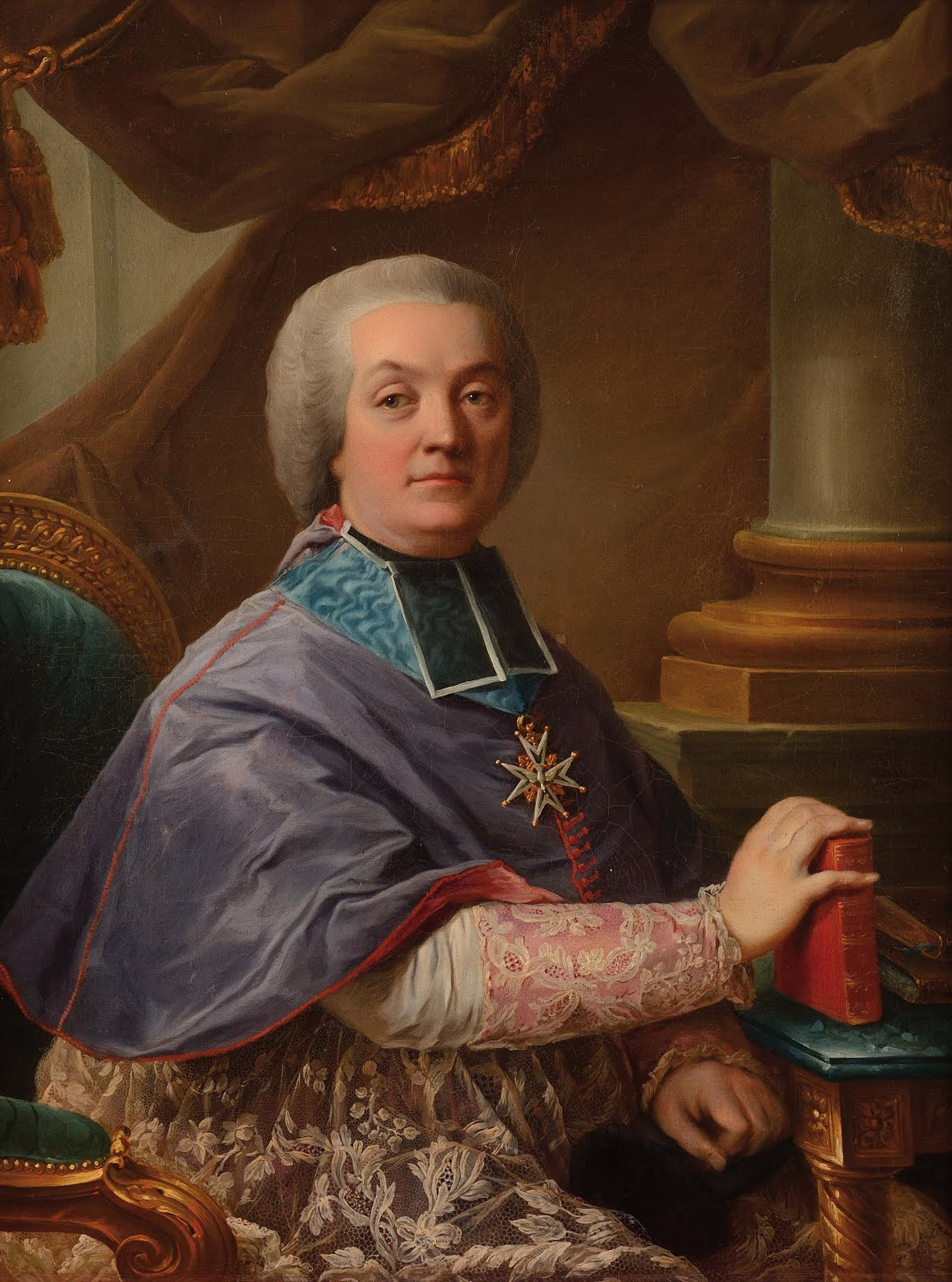
- Jean-Armand de Bessuéjouls Roquelaure; Portrait by Johann Julius Heinsius
- Church: Roman Catholic
- Archdiocese: Mechelen
- Appointed: 14 April 1802
- In office: 1802–1808
- Predecessor: Joannes-Henricus de Franckenberg
- Successor: Dominique-Georges-Frédéric Dufour de Pradt
- Previous post: Bishop of Senlis (1754–1801)

Orders
- Consecration: 16 June 1754 by Christophe de Beaumont

Personal details
- Born: 24 February 1721 Lassouts, Kingdom of France
- Died: 23 April 1818 (aged 97)
- Coat of arms

Jean-Armand de Bessuéjouls Roquelaure (Lassouts, Aveyron 24 February 1721 – 23 April 1818), was a Roman Catholic prelate. He was appointed Bishop of Senlis (France) on 17 March 1754 and resigned on 21 September 1801. He was appointed Archbishop of Malines on 9 April 1802 and resigned the see in 1809 due to old age.

== See also ==
- Archbishopric of Mechelen-Brussels

Catholic Church titles
Preceded by François-Firmin Trudaine	Bishop of Senlis until 1801	Succeeded by none
Preceded by Joannes-Henricus de Franckenberg	12th Archbishop of Mechelen; 1802-1808	Succeeded by Dominique-Georges-Frédéric Dufour de Pradt
