= Dominique-Georges-Frédéric Dufour de Pradt =

French clergyman and diplomat (1759–1837)

His Excellency Dominique-Georges-Frédéric Dufour de Pradt
- Archbishop of Mechelen; Primate of Belgium
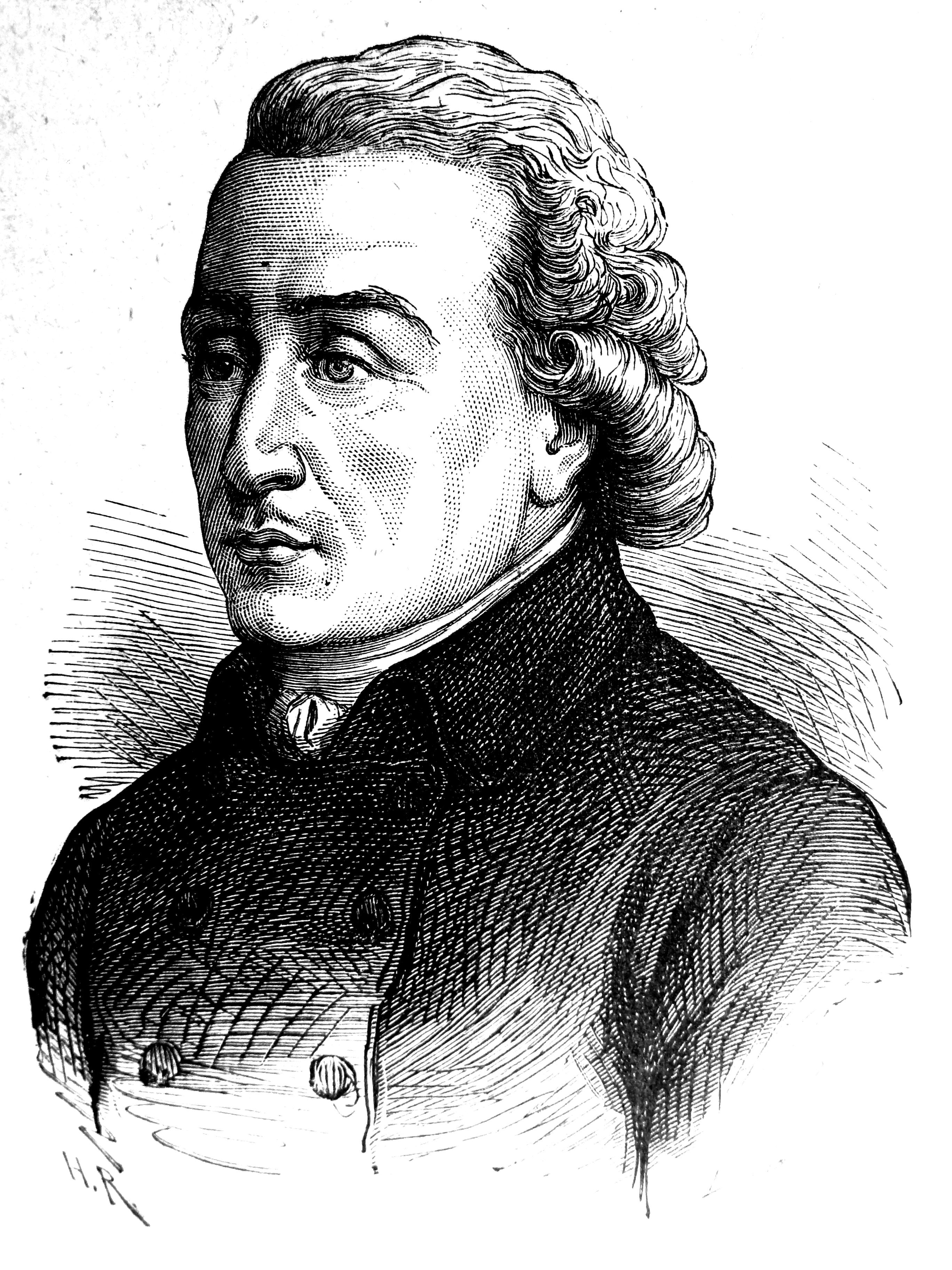
- Church: Roman Catholic
- Archdiocese: Mechelen
- Appointed: 27 March 1809
- In office: 1809–1815
- Predecessor: Jean-Armand de Bessuéjouls Roquelaure
- Successor: François Antoine Marie Constantin de Méan et de Beaurieux
- Previous post: Bishop of Poitiers (1805–1808)

Orders
- Ordination: June 1783
- Consecration: 2 February 1805 by Pius VII

Personal details
- Born: 23 April 1759 Allanche, Kingdom of France
- Died: 18 March 1837 (aged 77)

Abbé Dominique George Frédéric de Rion de Prolhiac Dufour or de Fourt de Pradt (23 April 1759 in Allanche (Auvergne, France) – 18 March 1837 in Paris) was a French clergyman and ambassador. As a diplomat, he went on numerous diplomatic missions for Napoleon.

He became a priest at the age of 24. A conservative, he was forced into exile from Revolutionary France in 1791. He favored monarchism over republicanism, but saw absolutist monarchies as an antiquated relic.

In 1804 he became a secretary of Napoleon, in 1805 Bishop of Poitiers. On 12 May 1808 he was appointed as archbishop of Mechelen (resigned in 1815). In 1812 he was awarded the position of the French ambassador in Warsaw, preparing the Concordat of 1813. After the Napoleonic wars he published a series of books which portrayed Russia as a "despotic" and "Asiatic" power hungry to conquer Europe.

== See also ==
- Archbishopric of Mechelen-Brussels

Catholic Church titles
Preceded by Jean-Armand de Bessuéjouls Roquelaure	13th Archbishop of Mechelen	Succeeded by François Antoine Marie Constantin de Méan et de Beaurieux

== Sources ==
- Archbishop Dominique-Georges-Frédéric Dufour de Pradt
