= Abraham Verhoeven =

Belgian newspaper publisher

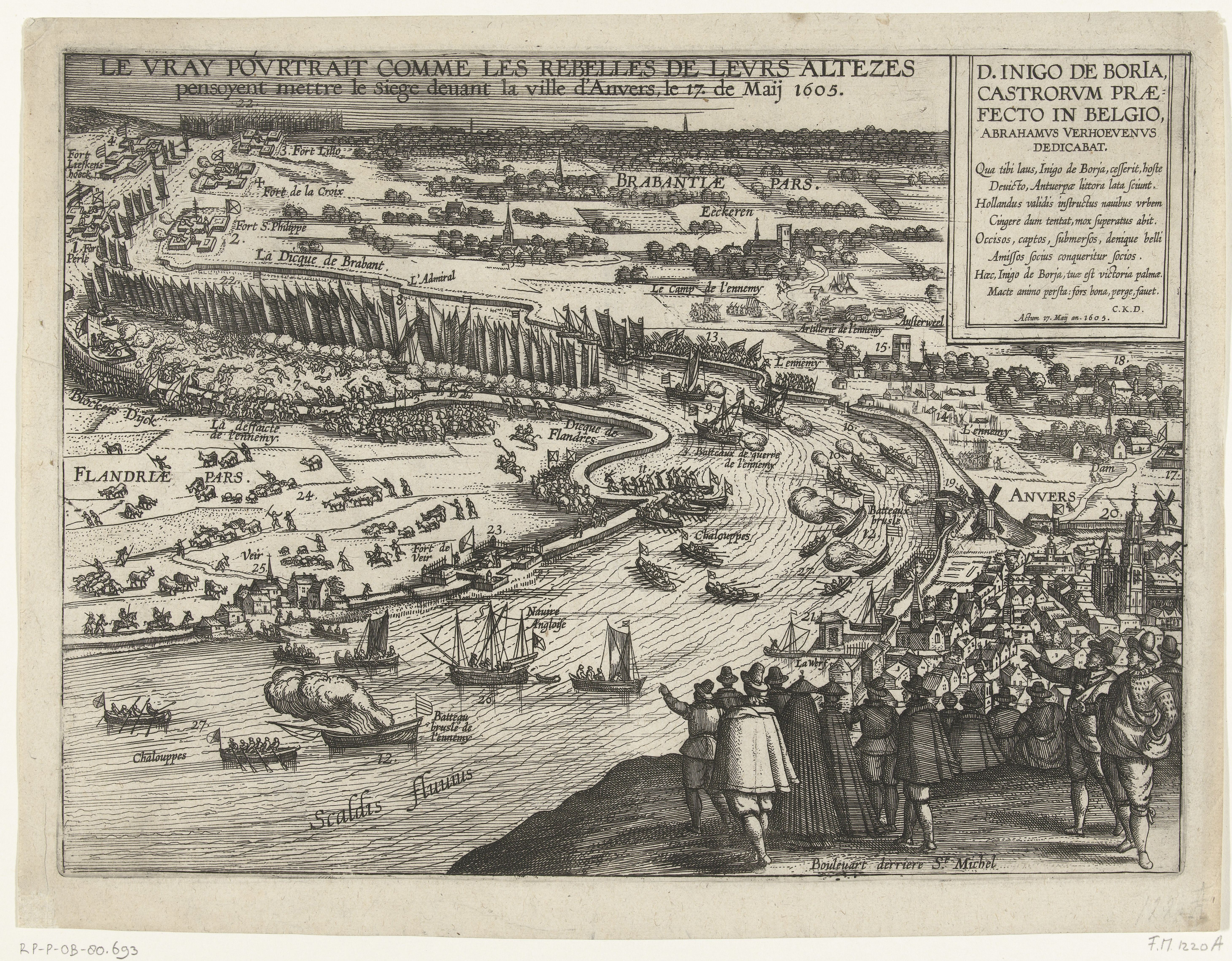
Íñigo de Borja repulses a Dutch force attempting a landing near Antwerp, 17 May 1605, published by Abraham Verhoeven

Abraham Verhoeven (1575–1652) was the publisher of the first newspaper of the Southern Netherlands.

In 1605 he got his license to print news of military victories in woodblock or copperplate. Thereafter he produced not only prints but also, with increasing frequency, illustrated news pamphlets. From early in 1620 he renewed his license in broader terms and began to print his news booklets as a single series. As a regularly printed news serial, this was the first newspaper of the Southern Netherlands. It was also the first regularly illustrated newspaper, and the first to print a headline on the front page. The newspaper had no consistent name or title masthead, and is known as the Nieuwe Tijdinghen (New Tidings), a retroactive designation given to it by historians and bibliographers. The British Library, however, catalogues its holdings of the series as Antwerp Gazette.

Publication of the Nieuwe Tijdinghen ceased in 1629, to be succeeded shortly thereafter by the Wekelijcke Tijdinghen (Weekly Tidings), an unillustrated paper with a reduced format that survived until 1632.

Verhoeven's newspapers chronicle the first decade of the Thirty Years' War and of the second phase of the Eighty Years' War from a pro-Catholic and pro-Habsburg editorial perspective.

== See also ==
- Abraham Catalogue of Belgian Newspapers, an online database of Belgian historical newspapers in libraries and other heritage institutions in Flanders and Brussels, named after Abraham Verhoeven.
