= Short Title Catalogue Flanders =

Belgian online bibliography

The Short Title Catalogue Flanders (STCV) is an online retrospective bibliography of books that were printed prior to 1801 within the current boundaries of Flanders (including Brussels). The project is executed by the Flanders Heritage Library network.

Given the large scope, the bibliography is created step by step. The final goal is to describe all printed publications prior to 1801 in one database. However, the majority of copies described so far are from the seventeenth and eighteenth century, since printed bibliographies of fifteenth- and sixteenth-century printed books from the Southern Netherlands already exist. The database is freely accessible via the internet and offers many possibilities to study the history of the handpress book in the Southern Netherlands.

== Contents ==
The STCV operates within certain chronological and geographical limits. The initial publication date for materials to be included was the seventeenth century. As of 2007, this was broadened into anything that was published before 1 January 1801. The geographical boundaries are the current territory of Flanders (including Brussels). This also includes 'fake' imprints that list a Flemish address but were actually printed elsewhere, double imprints of which one address is Flemish, and publications without an imprint when there is a strong indication that they were probably printed in Flanders.

Each record includes basic information such as title, author, imprint (printer, date and place of publication) and language. Every work is also described analytically and a full collation, pagination/foliation is provided, as well as the bibliographical format and also a bibliographical fingerprint for identification purposes. Keywords are also given to each work about its typography, subject, publication type and/or presence of paratexts, which allows for several different search and browse options. At the bottom of each record all the catalogued copies are listed by institution, as well as, when available, links to digital copies available online.

== Development ==
The STCV was started in 2000 following the model of the Dutch project Short Title Catalogue Netherlands (STCN) in the existing tradition of short title catalogues. In a first phase (2000–2003) only works printed in Dutch were recorded. During the second phase (2004–2007), the database was expanded to also include non-Dutch books. This phase was subsidised by the Flemish Community. Since September 2009, the STCV-project is part of Flanders Heritage Library, a consortium of six Flemish libraries with important heritage collections.

== Progress ==
So far a large portion of the rare book collections of the following institutions are already recorded: Hendrik Conscience Heritage Library (Antwerp), the Antwerp University Library, the Ghent University Library, the Leuven University Library, the Limburg Provincial Library (Hasselt), the Bruges Public Library, the city archive of Turnhout, the Plantin-Moretus Museum (Antwerp) and the Folger Shakespeare Library (Washington, D.C.). The following collections were process completely: the city archives of Mechelen and Oudenaarde, Royal Museum of Fine Arts Antwerp (KMSKA), DIVA Antwerp Home of Diamonds (Antwerp), the historic collection of the Corpus Christianorum (Turnhout) and the National Museum of the Playing Card (Turnhout). The STCV currently contains (February 2016) more than 41,000 copies in more than 22,500 records.

== Manual ==
Ever since the start, STCV has had a very extensive manual available for its cataloguers. It lists all the rules and guidelines and gives examples. This manual was based heavily on that of the STCN. The (2001) and (2005) edition were written in Dutch and appeared in print. As of October 2015, a new, updated edition is available online in English in wiki-format. Although it is still primarily aimed at cataloguers, it also offers useful information for all those interested in rare books.
