= Charles Fairfax (soldier) =

English soldier

Sir Charles Fairfax (c. 1567 – 17 September 1604) was an English soldier.

== Early life ==
Fairfax was the fourth son of Sir Thomas Fairfax of Denton and Nun Appleton in Yorkshire, and brother of Thomas Fairfax, 1st Lord Fairfax of Cameron. He was born in or about 1567, and when very young he went with his brother to serve under Sir Francis Vere in the Low Countries. Fairfax became a distinguished commander.

== Military career and death ==
At the battle of Nieuwport he rallied the English companies at a critical moment, and he was one of the defenders during the siege of Ostend. By desire of Francis Vere he went to the camp of the Archduke Albert as a hostage, and he fought in the breach when the Spanish forces assaulted the works in December 1601.

In May 1604 he was at the siege of Sluis, commanding troops which routed the Spanish general Luis de Velasco in the battle of Oostberg line. According to Dutch military historians François de Bas and F.J.G. Ten Raa, Fairfax later became commander of the English companies still fighting at Ostend. He landed there on 7 June with five companies of reinforcements, but was killed in the last stages of fighting on 17 September, only three days before the general surrender of the stronghold.
