= Lords of Ayseau =

Coat of arms of House of Gavre, Lords of Ayseau

The Lords of Ayseau(x) (sometimes d'Aysia) belonged to an ancient feudal nobility of the Duchy of Brabant. The Lordship was ruled by the House of Gavre, which descended from an illegitimate (later legitimized) offspring of the House of Brabant.

== History ==
The title was given to the legitimised son of the Duke of Brabant, and belonged for generations to their descendants. Various important noble houses, amongst them the Brant-family and the house of Ghistel took possession of the dominium. In 1454 Philipp, Duke of Brabant proclaimed that Arnould Brant would have a "rente héreditaire sur la Terre de Grobbendoncq." His brother Jean would inherit the benefits of Grobbendoncq in exchange of the lands of Ayseau.

The dominium was later elevated to a Marquisate in 1626 by King Philip IV of Spain for Rasse of Gavre, 1st Marquess of Ayseaux. The marquess of Ayseau took seat in the Second Estate of Brabant. The families were buried in the Church of Ayseau, where their mausoleum can be found.

=== House of Brant ===
John III, Duke of Brabant; (Elisabetha Maria of Huldenberg)

  1. John I Brant, 1st Lord of Ayseau (legitimized son);
    married to Catherine of Haneffe.
    1. John II Brant, 2nd Lord of Ayseau;
      married to Julliane of Spontin.
      1. Jean III Brant, 3rd Lord of Ayseau;
        married to Isabeau of Crainhem, Lady of Grobbendoncq.
        1. Arnout Brant, Lord of Grobbendoncq, Catherin of Heinsberge.
          1. Jean Brant, Lord of Grobbendoncq; married to Isabeau of Hornes.
        2. Willem Brant, 4th Lord of Ayseau
          1. John IV Brant, 5th Lord of Ayseau;
            married to Joanne of Boulé.
            1. Adrian Brant, 6th Lord of Ayseau;
              married to Antoinette of Bossu.
              1. John V Brant, 7th Lord of Ayseau;
                married to Catherin of Celles.
              2. Jacqueline, Lady of Ayseau;
                married to Adrian, Lord of l'Escatière.
                1. Honorine, Lady of Ayseau and l'Escatière;
                  married to Charles of Gavre, Count of Beaurieu.

=== House of Gavre ===
Charles of Gavre, Count of Beaurieu;
married to Honorine, Lady of Ayseau and l'Escatiere.

  1. Adrienne of Gavre;
    married to Charles, Marquess of Trazegnies.
  2. Adrian of Gavre, Lord of Ayseau;
    married to Anne of Ligne.
    1. Rasse I de Gavre, 1st Marquess of Ayseau;
      married to Anna de Velasco y Aragon.
      1. Pierre-Eugène de Gavre, 2nd Marquess of Ayseau;
        married to Anne-Florence, Countess of Hamal-Looz
        1. Rasse II François de Gavre, 3rd Marquess of Ayseau.;
          married to Marie-Cathérine, Countess de Brias
          1. Charles I Emmanuel, 1st Prince de Gavre; 4th Marquess of Ayseau;
            married to Louise Theresia de Waha
            1. Marie-Albertine de Gavre;
              married to Maximilian, 3rd Prince of Hornes
            2. François I Joseph, 2nd Prince de Gavre (1731-1797), Lord Chamberlain, Knight of the Golden Fleece
