= Charles Fairfax (priest) =

The Ven. Charles Fairfax was a Church of Ireland priest in the first quarter of the 18th century.

Fairfax was educated at Westminster School and Christ Church, Oxford. He held livings at Barnham, Suffolk and Euston, Suffolk. He was Archdeacon of Clogher from 1716 to 1718;

== Notes ==
Church of Ireland titles
Preceded by Benjamin Pratt	Dean of Down; 1724–1718	Succeeded by William Gore
