= Luis de Velasco y Velasco, 2nd Count of Salazar =

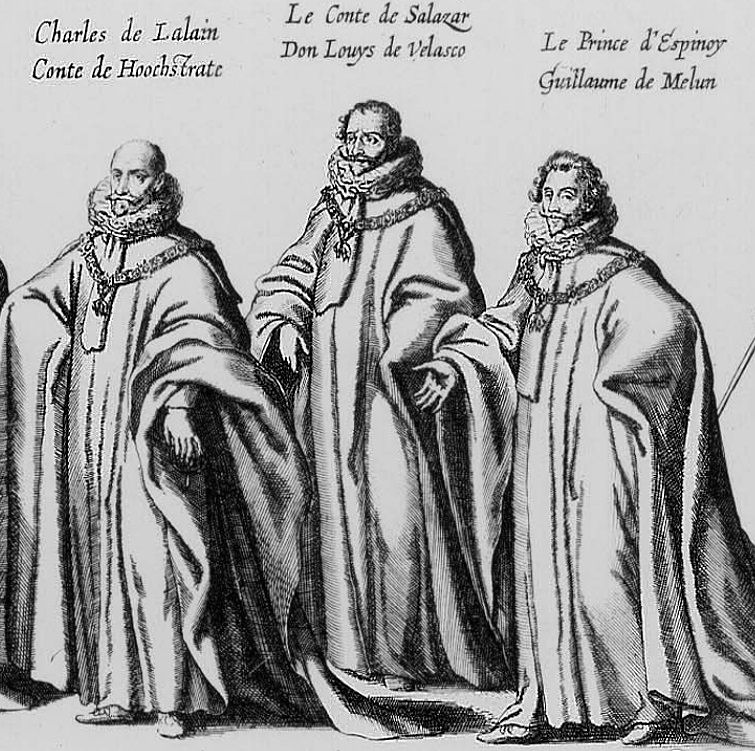
the 1st Count of Hoogstraeten and 2nd Count of Salazar during the Funeral of Albert VII, Archduke

Luis de Velasco y Velasco, 2nd Count of Salazar, 1st Marquess of Belvedere (Valladolid, Spain, 1559 – Dunkirk, Spanish Netherlands (present-day France), 1625) was a Spanish military commander during the French Wars of Religion and the Eighty Years' War.

== Life ==
His parents were Juan de Velasco, señor de Castrillo de Tejeriego and Beatriz de Mendoza, daughter of Luis de Velasco, marqués de Salinas. He married Anne de Hénin, daughter of Jacques de Hénin, Marquess of la Veere. He became the brother-in-law of Íñigo de Borja. They had two children:

- Juan de Velasco, 2nd Marquess of Belveder;
- Anna de Velasco; married to Rasse de Gavre, 1st Marquess of Ayseau, she became grandmother of Charles I Emmanuel, 1st Prince de Gavre

He is best remembered for his role in the Spanish conquest of Calais (1596), Steenbergen (1622) and the failed Siege of Bergen-op-Zoom (1622).

He became a Knight in the Order of the Golden Fleece in 1622.

He died from disease when he was in Dunkirk inspecting the defenses.
