= Flanders Heritage Library =

Library consortium of heritage libraries in Flanders

BibliothecairErfgoed.be or LibraryHeritage.be is a nonprofit organisation in the Flemish Region of Belgium. It supports organisations with a collection of library heritage such as manuscripts, early printed book, modern editions, newspapers or journals.

== Origins ==
The organisation was founded in 2008 as Vlaamse Erfgoedbibliotheek (Flanders Heritage Library) and was authorised as a heritage organisation for Flanders in 2012, changing its name to Vlaamse Erfgoedbibliotheken (Flanders Heritage Libraries) in 2019. It originated as a library consortium, bringing together six institutions with considerable holdings of manuscripts and old printed books.

The libraries associated in the network were:

- Hendrik Conscience Heritage Library in Antwerp
- Antwerp University Library
- Bruges Public Library
- Ghent University Library
- Hasselt Limburg Library (the former provincial library for Limburg)
- KU Leuven University Library

Since 2026 the organisation is known as BibliothecairErfgoed.be (LibraryHeritage.be), signaling a shift from network organisation to an organisation providing support and services to all organisations with library heritage in their collection.

== Databases ==
The organisation is involved in building and maintaining the Digital Heritage Library, with subsections for:

- Belgian newspapers (from 1800 to today), with many partner libraries across Flanders and Brussels
- Library Gems, an online repository of material from and about the area that is now Flanders
- Manuscripta, a catalogue of medieval manuscripts preserved in Flanders
- Early printed books (also known as Short Title Catalogue Flanders (STCV)), which aims to create a short-title catalogue of everything printed in the Southern Netherlands before 1801, with special attention to the earliest printed books or incunabula

LibraryHeritage.be is also the Flemish partner of the Digital Library for Dutch Literature.
