= Boussu =

Municipality in Hainaut Province, Wallonia, Belgium

Boussu Boussu-dlé-Mont (Picard)
- Municipality
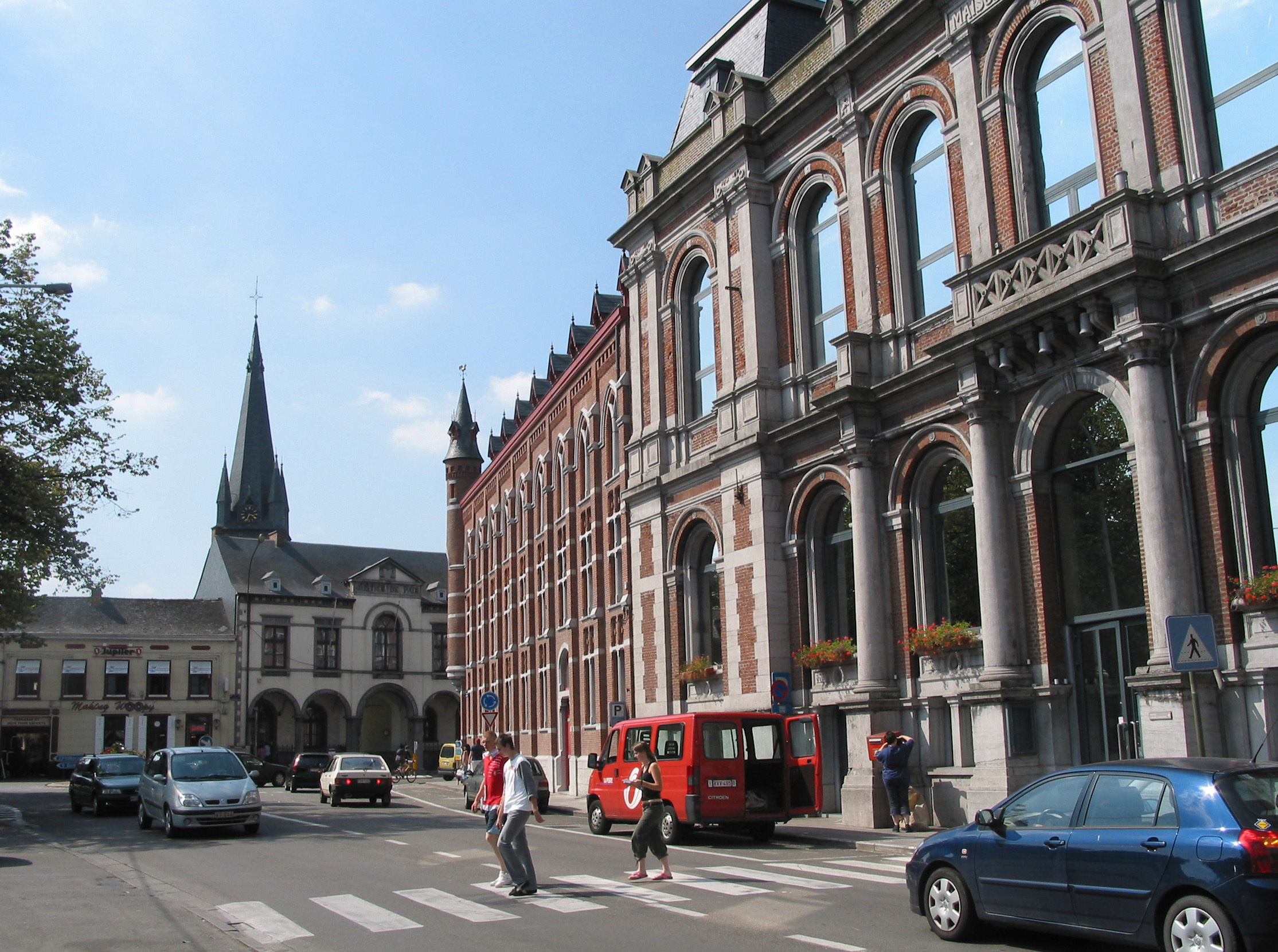

- Flag Coat of arms

- Location of Boussu in Hainaut
- Interactive map of Boussu
- Location in Belgium
- Coordinates: 50°26′N 03°48′E
- Country: Belgium
- Community: French Community
- Region: Wallonia
- Province: Hainaut
- Arrondissement: Mons

Government
  - Mayor: Sandra Narcisi (PS)
  - Governing party: PS

Area
  - Total: 20.08 km^{2} (7.75 sq mi)

Population (2018-01-01)
  - Total: 19,856
  - Density: 988.8/km^{2} (2,561/sq mi)
- Postal codes: 7300, 7301
- NIS code: 53014
- Area codes: 065
- Website: www.boussu.be

Boussu (French pronunciation: [busy]; Picard: Boussu-dlé-Mont) is a municipality of Wallonia located in the province of Hainaut, Belgium.

As of January 1, 2006, Boussu had a population of 20,058. The total area is 20.01 km^{2}, which gives a population density of 1,002 inhabitants per km^{2}.

The municipality consists of the following districts: Boussu and Hornu.

== History ==
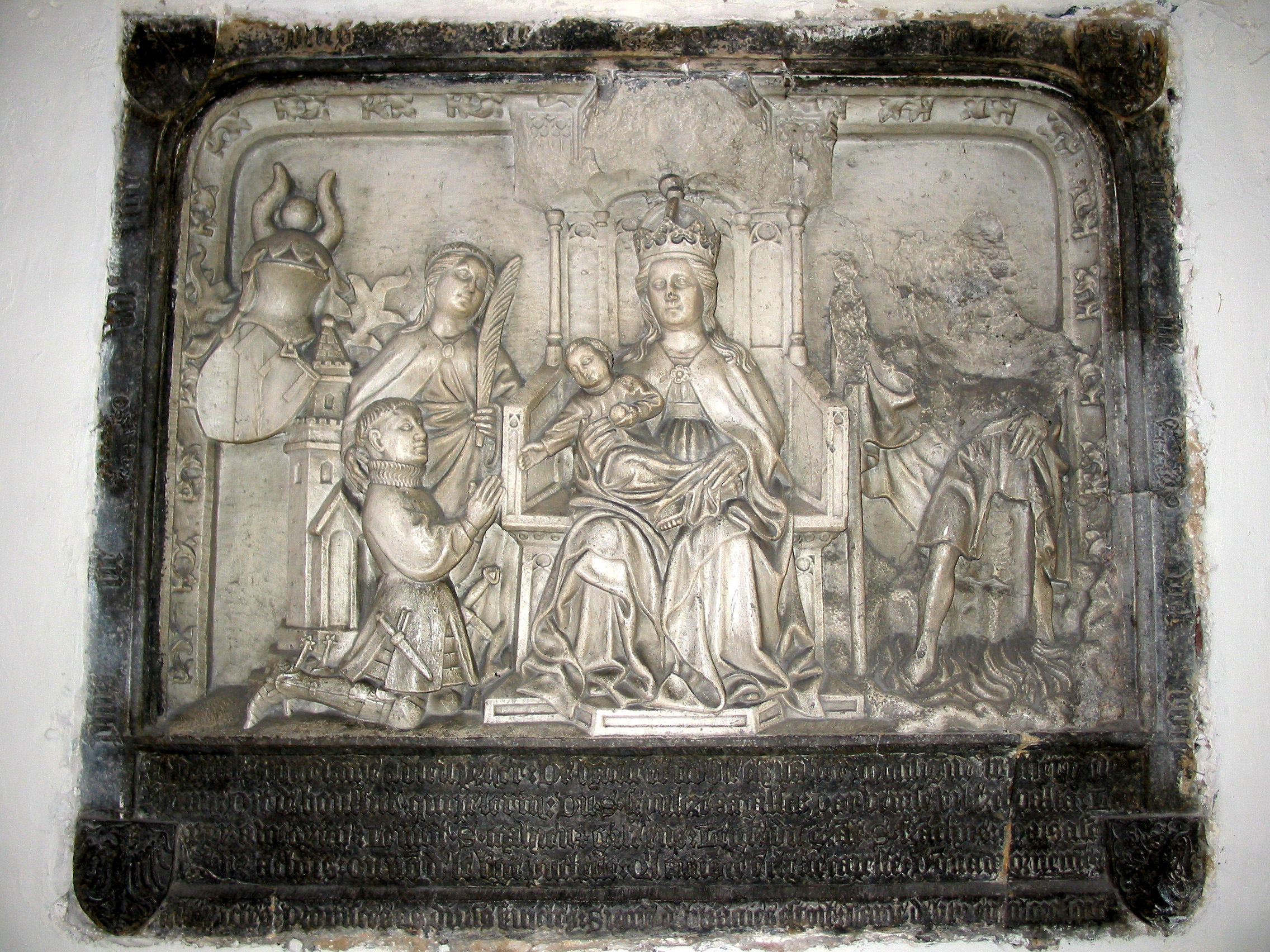
Thierry de Hennin Liétard funerary memorial (1406–1430)

During the late Middle Ages the town gave his name to an important branch of the House of Hénin. The castle of Boussu was constructed in this period, and important members of this family are buried inside the church. Most famous is the Mausoleum of Maximilien II de Hénin, 5th Count of Bossu. The Book of Hours of Boussu, named after the town, is an illuminated manuscript made for Isabelle de Lalaing, widow of Pierre de Hennin (of the Hénin family).

In the 19th century local industry expanded. A planned industrial city, called le Grand Hornu, was constructed. Located in Hornu, the buildings are now a museum.

== Etymology ==
As its neighbouring municipality, Hornu, Boussu's town is very old and the history of Saint Waudru mentions the existence of a church in the 13th century. In the acts of the past, Boussu conquered very diverse titles: Buxutum, Bussuth, Bussut, Bossut, Boussut. However, the etymology is very simple. This means "the place abundant in boxwood" (in Latin buxus: meaning boxwood or buxutum meaning boxwood coppice).

== Famous inhabitants ==
- Marcel Moreau, writer
- Massimo Bruno, Footballer and Belgian youth international
