= House of Hénin =

Belgian noble family

(de) Hénin-Liétard
- noble family
- Country: Holy Roman Empire County of Hainaut Habsburg Netherlands Spanish Netherlands Austrian Netherlands First French Empire; United Kingdom of the Netherlands Kingdom of Belgium
- Founder: Thierry of Alcase
- Titles: Lords of Gammérages Lords of Wavrans; Barons of Cuvilliers; Barons of Fosseux; Barons of Liedekercke; Counts of Beaumont; Counts of Boussu; Marquesses of Alcase; Marquesses of La Veere Princes of Chimay
- Cadet branches: de Hénnin de Cuvillers.

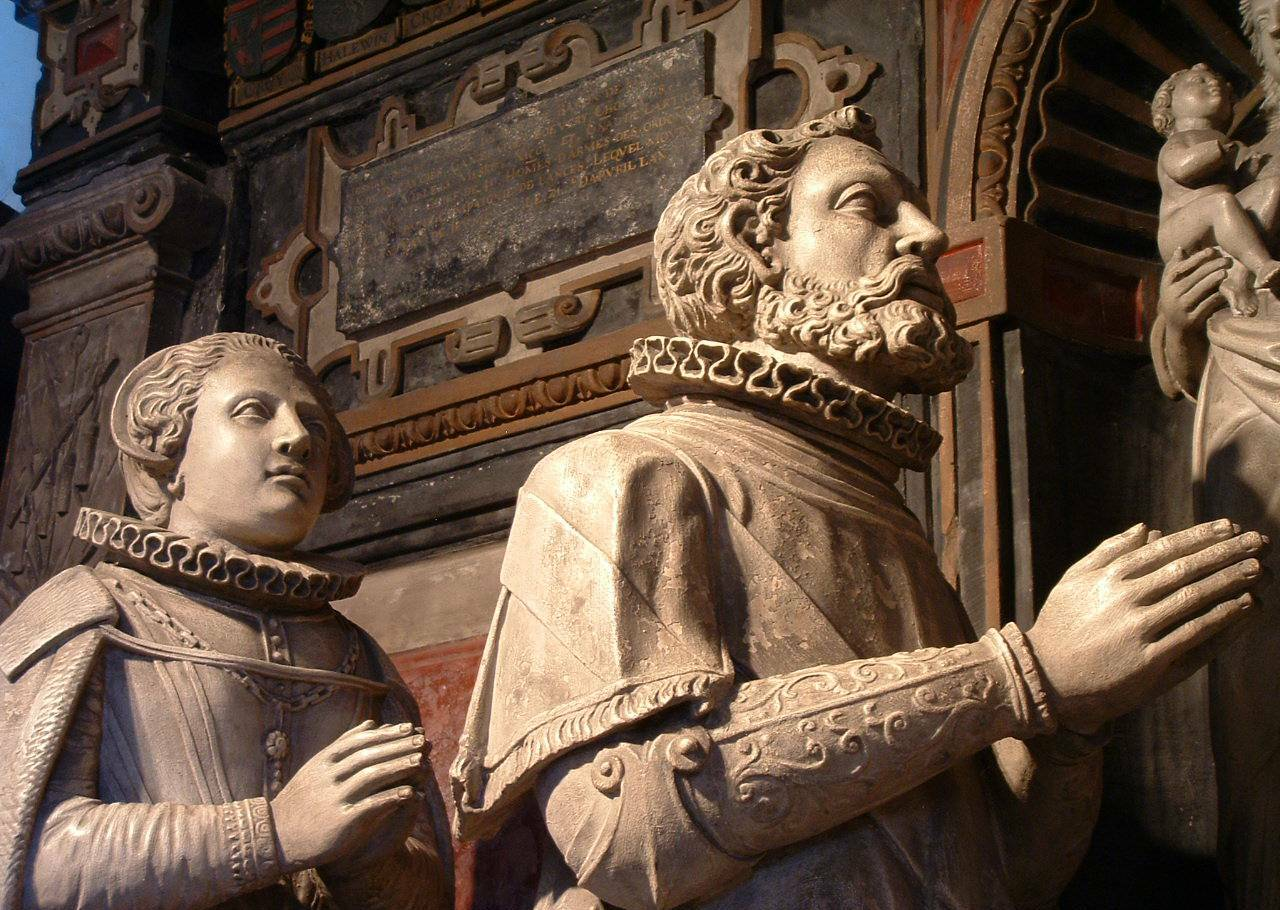
Mausoleum of the Counts of Boussu

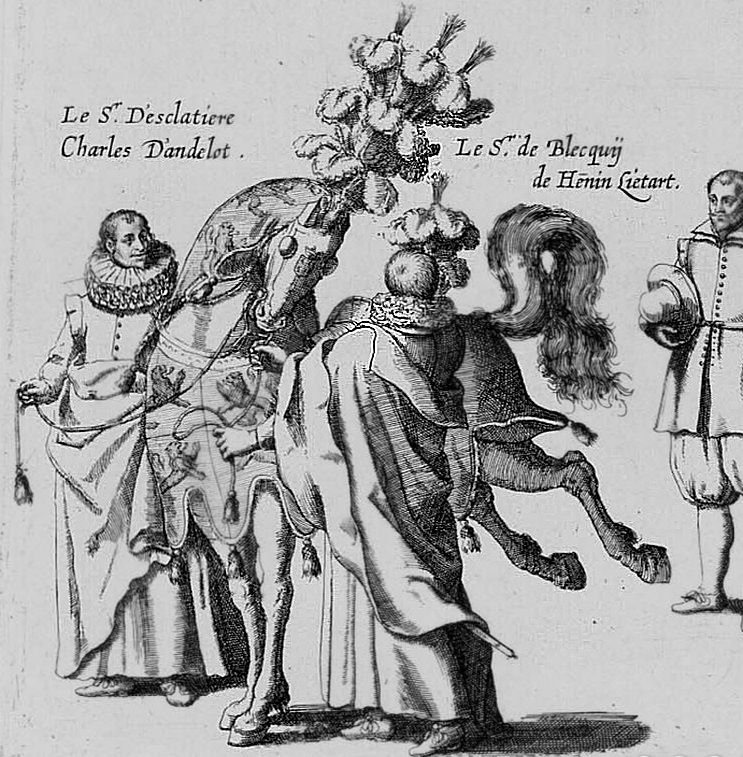
Pompa Funebris Albert VII

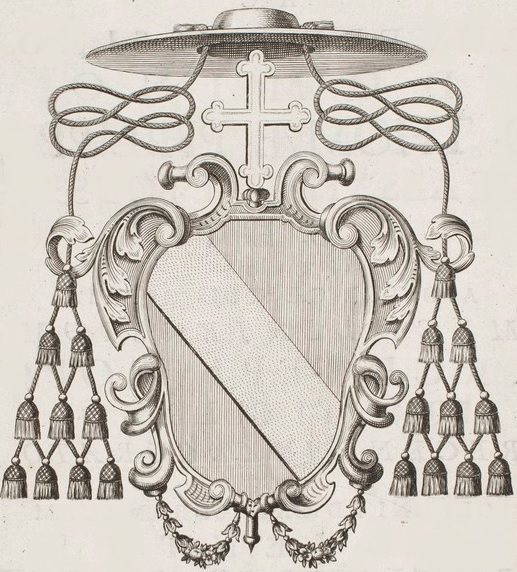
Coat of Cardinal d'Alcase

The House of Hénin is a family of the Belgian high nobility, one branch of which was titled Prince of Chimay. Alliances were made with important Spanish noble families, such as the Aragonese house of Borja and the Castilian house of Velasco.

== History ==
The name derives from the town of Hénin-Beaumont in Flanders-Artois, now in Northern France. In the 13th century, the family grew into three different branches, such as the branch of Hénin-Liétard d'Alcase and the branch of the lords of Boussu.

The main family mausoleum ("Chapelle des Seigneurs") is located inside the Church of Boussu and is considered one of the major artworks of Jacques Du Brœucq.

== Members ==
=== Counts of Boussu ===
- Pierre I de Hénin, Lord of Boussu † 1490: knight of the Golden Fleece.;
  married to Isabeau of Lalaing.
  - Philippe de Hénin, Lord of Boussu;
    married to Catherine of Ligne-Barbançon
    - Jean V de Hénin, 1st Count of Boussu; knight of the Golden Fleece;
      married to Anne of Bourgogne
      - Charles de Hénin, 2nd Count of Boussu: No heirs.
      - Maximilien de Hénin, 3rd Count of Boussu;
        married to Marguerite of Croy.
        - Pierre II de Hénin, 4th Count of Boussu
      - Jacques de Hénin, Marquess of la Veere;
        married to Marie of Hanaert, Baroness of Liedekercke.
        - Marie de Boussu;
          married to Otto of Brunswick.
        - Anne de Boussu;
          married to Luis de Velasco y Velasco, 2nd Count of Salazar.
          - Juan de Velasco, 2nd Marquess of Belveder;
          - Anna de Velasco;
            married to Rasse de Gavre, 1st Marquess of Ayseau
        - Hélène de Boussu;
          married to Íñigo de Borja
        - Maximilien II de Hénin, 5th Count of Boussu and Marquess of la Vere;
          married to Alexandrine of Gavre.
          - Eugène de Hénin, 6th Count of Boussu and Marquess of la Vere;
            married to Anna-Isabella of Arenberg, Princess of Chimay.

=== Princes of Chimay ===
- Philippe-Louis de Hénin, 7th Count of Boussu (1646–1688) 10th Prince of Chimay, count of Beaumont, Marquess of la Veere and Baron of Liedekercke: Knight of the Golden Fleece
  Married to Anne-Louise Verreycken d'Impden.
  - Charles-Louis- Antoine de Henin-Liétard d'Alsace (1675–1740) 11th Prince of Chimay
    married to Charlotte, the daughter of Louis de Rouvroy, duc de Saint-Simon.
  - Thomas Philip Wallrad de Hénin-Liétard d'Alsace (1679–1759) Cardinal, Archbishop of Mechelen
  - Alexandre Gabriel Joseph de Hénin-Liétard, Marquess of La Verre (1681–1745) 12th Prince of Chimay
    - Thomas Alexandre Marc Henri de Hénin-Liétard, prince of Chimay (1732–1759)
    - Jean-François-Joseph de Hénin-Liétard d'Alsace (1733–1797)
      married to Marie Anne Albertine Françoise van de Werve (1747–1810)
      - Pierre-Simon de Hénin-Liétard d'Alsace (1772–1825)
        married to Charlotte Louise Henriette de Croismare (1786–1841)
        - Charles Louis Albert de Hénin-Liétard (1805–1860)
          married to Louise Françoise Pauline, Baroness Durand de Pisieux (1812–1887)
          - Simon-Gérard d'Alsace de Hénin-Liétard d'Alsace (1832–1891)
            married to Baroness Angélique van Brienen de Grootelindt (1832–1921)
            - Thierry-Arno-Baudoin-Philippe de Hénin-Liétard d'Alsace (1853–1934), French senator
              married to Charlotte Gabrielle de Ganay
          - Philippe-Charles de Hénin-Liétard d'Alsace (1855–1914)
            married to Hélène-Marie-Éléonore van Brienen de Groote Lindt
    - Philippe Gabriel Maurice Joseph de Hénin-Liétard, 15th prince of Chimay (1736–1804),
      married to Laure-Auguste de Fitz-James, Princess de Chimay.
    - Charles-Joseph de Hénin-Liétard d'Alsace (1744–1794), executed by guillotine
      married to Adélaïde Félicité Étiennette de Monconseil
  - Marguerite-Therese d'Alcase, died 1693;
    married to don Domingo de Aquaviva de Aragon
  - Anne-Ernestine d'Alcase:
    Married to the Marques of Los Rios.

== See also ==
- Boussu
- Prince de Chimay
