= Íñigo de Borja =

Spanish nobleman and military commander

Don Íñigo de Borja y Velasco
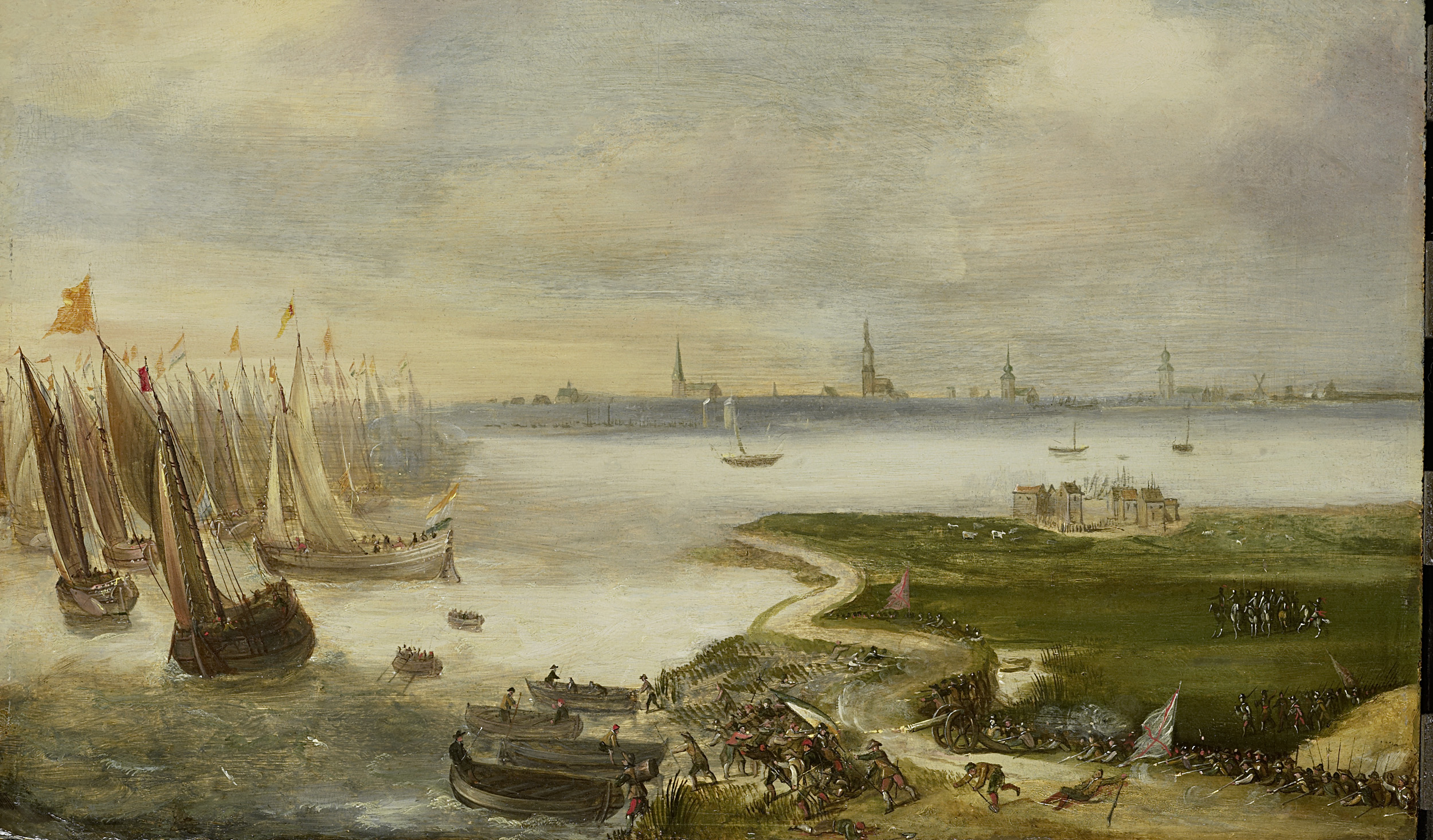
- The repulse of the Dutch landing at Blokkersdijk by troops fighting under Don Iñigo de Borja
- Born: 1575; Gandía
- Died: 1622 (aged 46–47)
- Occupations: Spanish nobleman and military commander
- Known for: serving as governor of Antwerp Citadel

Don Íñigo de Borja y Velasco (1575–1622) was a Spanish nobleman and military commander who served as governor of Antwerp Citadel.

== Family ==
Don Íñigo was born at Gandía in 1575 to the prominent Spanish noble house of Borja, the son of Francisco Tomás de Borja y Centelles, sixth Duke of Gandia. His grandfather was Íñigo Fernández de Velasco, 2nd Duke of Frías. His brother, Gaspar de Borja y Velasco, archbishop of Toledo and Seville, was the wealthiest clergyman in Spain.

Íñigo married the Flemish noble lady Hélène de Hénin-Liétard, daughter of the Marquess of Veere, with whom he had five children:

- Don Gaspar de Borja y Hénin.
- Don Francisco de Borja y Hénin.
- Doña Juana de Borja y Hénin, married first Don Juan de Vega y Menchaca, III conde de Grajal, second Don Luis Francisco Núñez de Guzmán
- Doña María Teresa de Borja y Hénin, married first Don Gaspar Antonio de Alvarado, second Don Fernando Miguel de Tejada
- Doña Ana Clara de Borja y Hénin.

== Military career ==
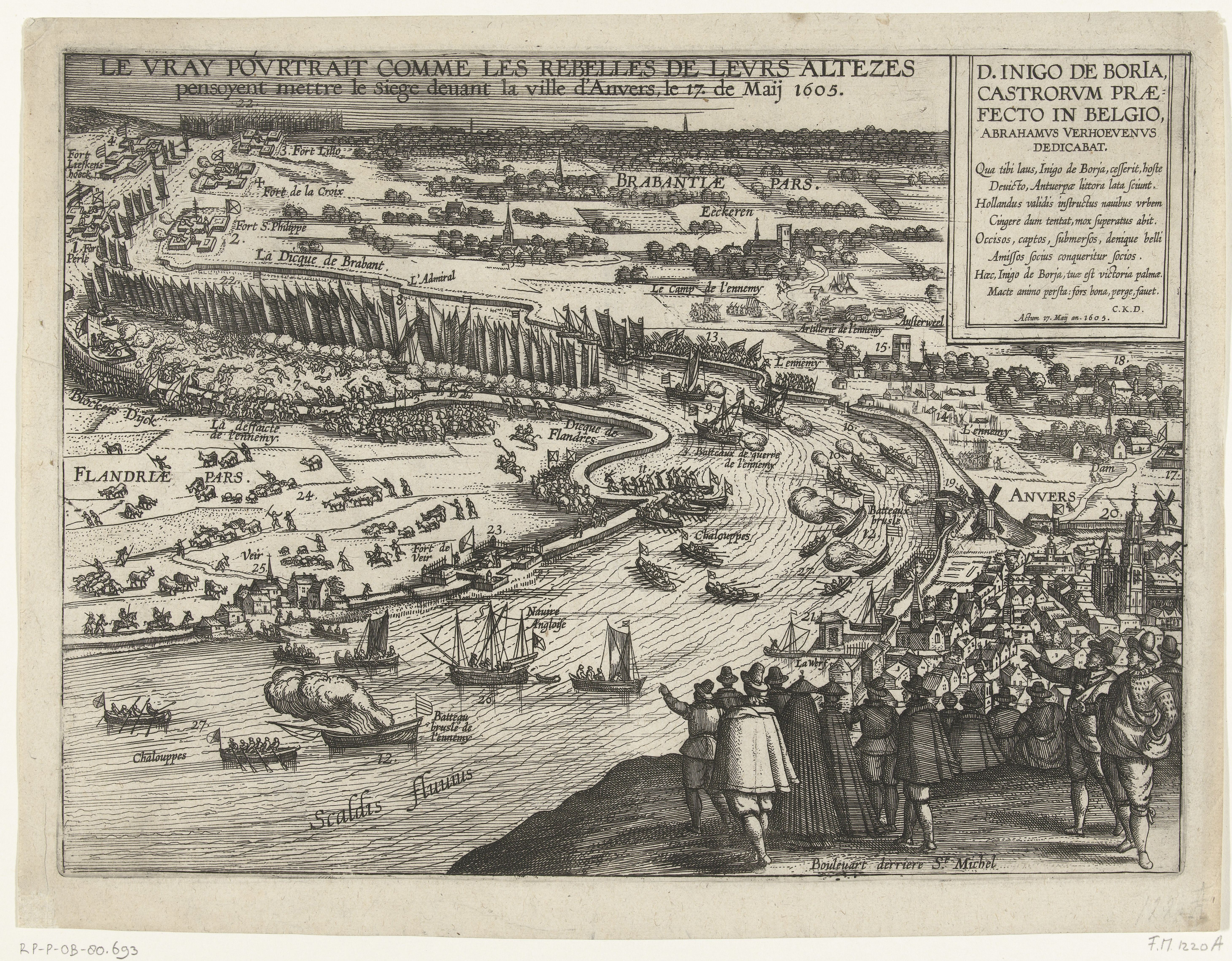
Íñigo de Borja repulses a Dutch force attempting a landing near Antwerp, 17 May 1605, published by Abraham Verhoeven

Early in his career Borja became a knight of the Order of Santiago, holding the commandery of Membrilla. He served with the forces of Philip II of Spain in France and Burgundy in the 1590s, and after the Peace of Vervins (1598) in northern Italy. He went to the Low Countries in 1603, marching a force of 3,700 men along the Spanish Road to serve Albert VII, Archduke of Austria. In 1605 he led the Antwerp garrison in repulsing a Dutch landing at Blokkersdijk on the left bank of the Scheldt opposite Antwerp, led by Ernest Casimir I, Count of Nassau-Dietz. This victory was celebrated in a broadsheet published by Abraham Verhoeven, with a Latin verse by Cornelis Kiliaan.

During his military career Borja went on to participate in the 1606 Siege of Grol and was appointed general of artillery in the Army of Flanders. He was governor of Antwerp Citadel from 1606 until his death. In 1614, during the War of the Jülich Succession, he took part in the capture of Wesel.

Borja died in Brussels on 31 October 1622.
