= Charles I Emmanuel, 1st Prince de Gavre =

Charles Emmanuel Joseph, 1st Prince de Gavre, 4th Marquess of Ayseaux, Count of the Empire (1694 - 1773) was the first Prince de Gavre, created by Emperor Charles VI in 1736. He was the son of Rasse II François of Gavre, 3rd Marquess of Ayseau, and Marie Catherine de Brias.

He was Grand marshall at the imperial court of Charles Alexander of Lorraine, governor of the Austrian Netherlands, and knight of the Golden Fleece.

== Marriage and issue ==
He married Louise Theresia de Waha and had descendants:

  1. François I Joseph, 2nd Prince de Gavre (1731-1797), Lord Chamberlain, Knight of the Golden Fleece,
    married Marie-Anne de Rouveroy de Pamele (1730-1804), Lady of the Starry Cross.
    1. Charles II Alexandre François, 3rd Prince de Gavre: Knight of the Belgian Lion and Saint Hubert.
      married to Maria-Thecla, Countess vom Egger
      1. François II Antoine, 4th prince de Gavre, Lord Chamberlain of the King of Holland
    2. Leopold Joseph de Gavre
    3. Marie Maximiliane de Gavre, married Hermann, Prince of Hohenzollern-Hechingen
      1. Friedrich Hermann Otto, Prince of Hohenzollern-Hechingen, married Princess Pauline, Duchess of Sagan
    4. Marie Charlotte de Gavre
    5. Marie Christine de Gavre, Lady of the Starry Cross,
      married Philippe-Joseph du Sart
  2. Eugène de Gavre
  3. Marie-Theodore de Gavre,
    married to Honore-Ignace de Glymes-Brabant, son of Ignace-François de Glymes-Brabant, Lord of la Falize
  4. Marie-Albertine de Gavre;
    married Maximilien, Prince of Hornes
    1. Marie-Thérèse-Josepha de Hornes:
      married Prince Philip Joseph of Salm-Kyrburg.
      1. 10 children, and descendance including the current Kings of Romania, Portugal, Belgium.
