= Nieuwe Tijdinghen =

- Type: Weekly newspaper
- Format: quarto booklet
- Owner: Abraham Verhoeven
- Publisher: Abraham Verhoeven
- Staff writers: Richard Verstegan
- Founded: 1620
- Ceased publication: 1629
- Political alignment: pro-Habsburg
- Language: Dutch
- Headquarters: Antwerp

Nieuwe Tijdinghen (in English also known as the Antwerp Gazette) is the name later cataloguers and bibliographers have given to the first Flemish newspaper (1620–1629), which was published without a single fixed title. News was printed from across Western and Central Europe.

From 15 February 1620, consecutive signatures were used on each issue, so that they could be collected and bound as a set. From 8 January 1621, issues were numbered consecutively on the front page.

The Nieuwe Tijdinghen carried a wide range of general news, and sometimes included celebratory, polemical or satirical comments, verses, songs and prayers. Each issue was illustrated with a woodcut on the front page, and occasionally with further woodcuts on the back pages. The editorial perspective was outspokenly Catholic and pro-Habsburg.

Publication was licensed by the authorities, and almost all issues bear the initials of the canon of Antwerp cathedral who acted as ecclesiastical censor.

Considerable runs are preserved in the British Library (1620–1621), Ghent University Library, the Erfgoedbibliotheek Hendrik Conscience (1620–1625) and the Royal Library of Belgium (1622–1628).
