= Triple Alliance =

Triple Alliance may refer to:

- Aztec Triple Alliance (1428–1521), Tenochtitlan, Texcoco, and Tlacopan and in central Mexico
- Triple Alliance (1596), England, France, and the Dutch Republic to counter Spain
- Triple Alliance (1668), England, the Dutch Republic, and Sweden to counter France
- Triple Alliance (1717), Great Britain, the Dutch Republic, and France to counter Spain
- Triple Alliance (1788), Great Britain, the Dutch Republic, and Prussia to counter Russia
- Treaty of the Triple Alliance (1865), Brazil, Uruguay, and Argentina against Paraguay in the Paraguayan War (1864–1870)
- Triple Alliance (1882), Germany, Austria-Hungary, and Italy to counter France and Russia
- Triple Alliance (Trade unionism), an alliance of British trade unions: Miners' Federation of Great Britain, National Transport Workers' Federation, and National Union of Railwaymen
- HMT Triple Alliance, a requisitioned trawler of the Royal Navy in World War II
- Triple Alliance (Estonia), political term for coalition governments of the Reform Party, Isamaa, and the Social Democrats

== See also ==
- Diplomatic Revolution of 1756 (1756), France, Austria, and Russia following the War of the Austrian Succession
- Holy Alliance (1815), Russia, Austria and Prussia following the Napoleonic Wars
- Triple alliance negotiations (1939), an unsuccessful attempt to create an anti-Mussolini-Hitler coalition
- Triple Intervention, an 1895 diplomatic intervention by Russia, Germany, and France with Japan over the terms of the Treaty of Shimonoseki
- Triple Entente (1907), Britain, France and Russia in the lead-up to World War I
- Tripartite Pact (1940), Germany, Italy and Japan during World War II
- American–Japanese–Korean trilateral pact (2023), USA, Japan, and South Korea security over North Korean nuclear plan and China escalating tensions with Taiwan
- Dual Alliance (disambiguation)
- Quadruple Alliance (disambiguation)
- Triumvirate (disambiguation)
