= Jan Neyen =

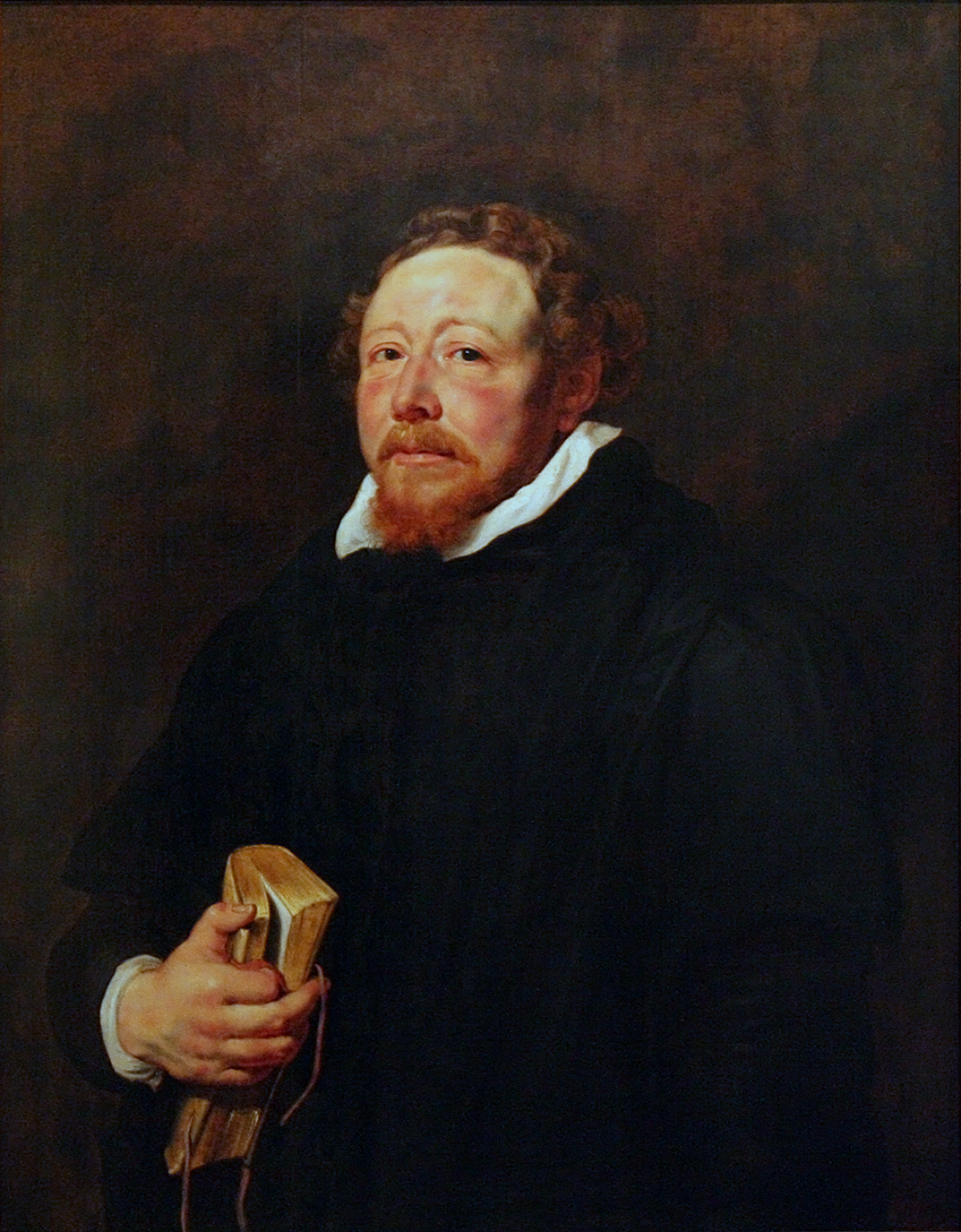
Portrait of Jan Neyen by Peter Paul Rubens, c. 1608

Jan Neyen (c. 1560–1612) was a Franciscan friar and diplomat from the Habsburg Netherlands, who was involved in negotiating the Twelve Years' Truce of 1609–1621.

Born in Antwerp to an ardently Calvinist family, Neyen became a Catholic in his 20s and joined the Recollects, a branch of the Franciscan Order. He served as Guardian of his province for six years, and as commissioner general of his order in Spain. He spoke several languages and was renowned as a preacher. In 1607 the Archdukes Albert and Isabella sent him to The Hague to negotiate a ceasefire in the Eighty Years War and begin the talks that would lead to the Twelve Years Truce in 1609. In 1608 he returned to The Hague, as part of the delegation headed by Ambrogio Spinola that also included Juan de Mancicidor, Jean Richardot, and Louis Verreycken. When deadlock was reached over the recognition of Dutch independence, Neyen travelled to Spain to obtain the king's agreement to the formula that the Dutch Republic would be treated "as though" sovereign for the duration of the truce. After the conclusion of the negotiations he returned to his convent, and did not take part in the public proclamation and celebration that followed in April 1609. He died on 20 November 1612.
