= Second Treaty of Paris =

The Second Treaty of Paris may refer to:

- Treaty of Paris (1783), with the Treaty of Paris (1763) being the first.
- Treaty of Paris (1815), with the Treaty of Paris (1814) being the first.
