= Chiffon de Carlsbad =

Chiffon de Carlsbad is the name for the enunciation of principles by Austria and Russia (and later Prussia) in response to France's July Revolution of 1830. The three allies pledged themselves to maintain the 1815 settlement and warned the new French government not to disturb it anywhere in Europe.

Klemens von Metternich, the Austrian Chancellor and Foreign Minister, wrote to Francis I on 5 August, declaring that the reports of the revolution in France "prove only too surely that the downfall of things at Paris is well-nigh complete". He lamented that "[a]ll the men who have been placed in office belong to the extreme left. There is not a single respectable citizen among them". Metternich assured the Emperor that at his meeting with the Russian Foreign Minister, Karl Nesselrode, he would discuss "the ways and means...by which a basis of union between the Great Powers, and in especial the old Quadruple Alliance, might be found, and the aim of which must be to give unity to their resolutions and proceedings". The interview between Metternich and Nesselrode took place at Carlsbad on 6 August and afterwards Metternich wrote down the agreed basis for union, which became known as the Chiffon de Carlsbad:

To adopt for the general basis of our conduct not in any way to interfere in the internal disputes of France but, on the other hand, to permit no violation on that part of the French Government either of the material interests of Europe, as established and guaranteed by general transactions, or of the internal peace of the various States composing it.
