= Quadruple Alliance =

Quadruple Alliance may refer to:

- The 1718 alliance between Austria, France, the Netherlands, and Great Britain during the War of the Quadruple Alliance
- The alliance between Great Britain, Austria, the Netherlands, and Saxony in the Treaty of Warsaw (1745) to uphold the Pragmatic Sanction
- The Quadruple Alliance (1815) between the United Kingdom, Austria, Prussia, and Russia following the Napoleonic Wars
- The 1834 Quadruple Alliance between the United Kingdom, France, Spain, and Portugal to enforce the Concession of Evoramonte
- The Quadruple Alliance (1915-1918) another name for the Central Powers of World War I

== See also ==
- Triple Alliance (disambiguation)
- Quadripartite Agreement (disambiguation)
- Quintuple Alliance
