= Quadruple =

Quadruple may refer to:

- 4-tuple, an ordered list of elements, with four elements
- Quadruple jump, a figure skating jump
- Quadruple (computing), a term used as alternative for nibble in some contexts
- Quadruple-precision floating-point format in computing
- Quadruple (football), a term for winning four football trophies in a single season

== See also ==
- 4 (disambiguation)
- Quadruple Alliance (disambiguation), any of a number of military alliances
- Quadruple glazing, a type of insulated glazing
- Quadrupel, a strong beer
- Quadripole
- Quadrupole
