= Twelve Years' Truce =

Ceasefire during the Eighty Years' War

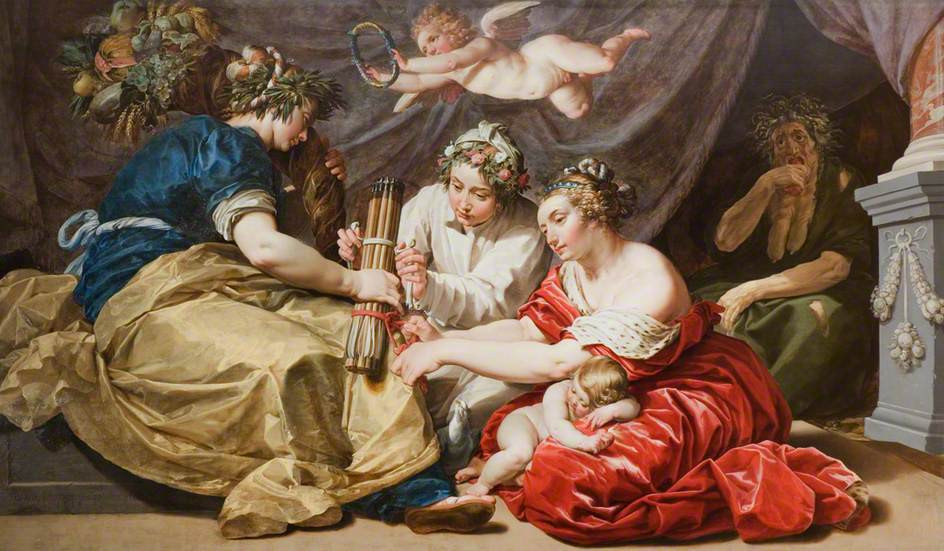
Allegory of Peace and Plenty painted by Abraham Janssens to laud the return of prosperity during the Twelve Years' Truce.

The Twelve Years' Truce was a ceasefire during the Eighty Years' War between Spain and the Dutch Republic, agreed in Antwerp on 9 April 1609 and ended on 9 April 1621. While European powers like France began treating the Republic as a sovereign state, the Spanish viewed it as a temporary measure forced on them by financial exhaustion and domestic issues and did not formally recognise Dutch independence until the Treaty of Westphalia in 1648. The Truce allowed Philip III of Spain to focus his resources elsewhere, while Archdukes Albert and Isabella used it to consolidate Habsburg rule and implement the Counter-Reformation in the Southern Netherlands.

== Context ==
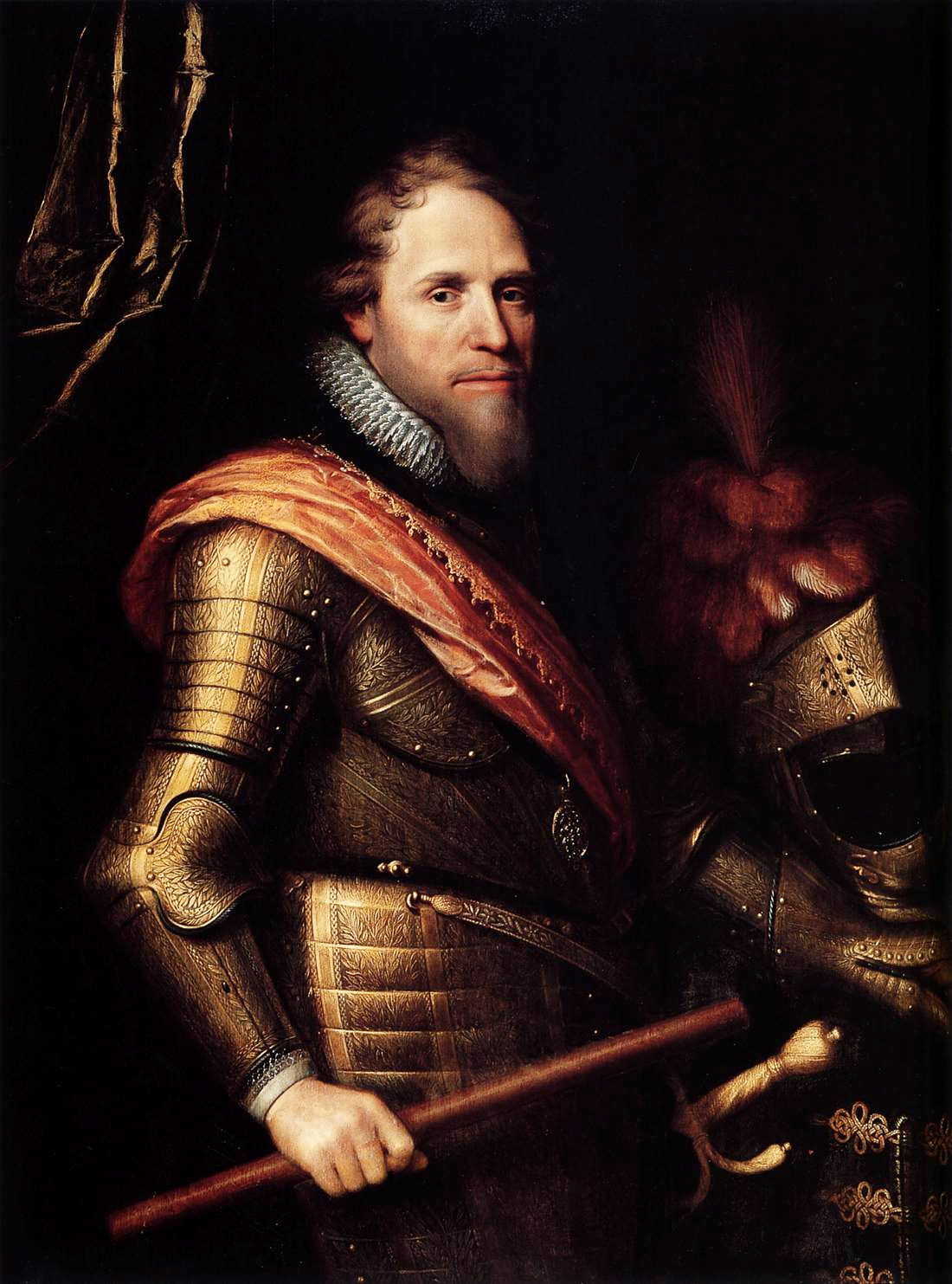
Stadtholder Maurice of Nassau by school of Michiel Jansz. van Mierevelt.

The Dutch Republic achieved significant military gains in the 1590s. After the fall of Antwerp in 1585, Spain's Philip II ordered Alexander Farnese to direct his military actions first towards the failed campaign of the Spanish Armada, then against France to prevent the succession of Henry IV, a Protestant. In the following years the Army of Flanders was entirely on the defensive. Spain's predicament was adroitly used by Stadtholder Maurice. In a series of campaigns, the Dutch States Army surprised Breda in 1590, took Deventer, Hulst and Nijmegen the following year and captured Groningen in 1594. By that stage the Army of Flanders had lost almost all its strategic positions north of the great rivers. To make matters worse, England, France, and the Dutch Republic established the Triple Alliance (1596) counter Spain. Unable to sustain the cost of a war on three fronts, Philip II was forced to declare a suspension of troop payments in 1596 as well. Another campaign by Maurice in 1597 saw the Dutch States Army capture multiple border fortresses in the north and east of the Netherlands.

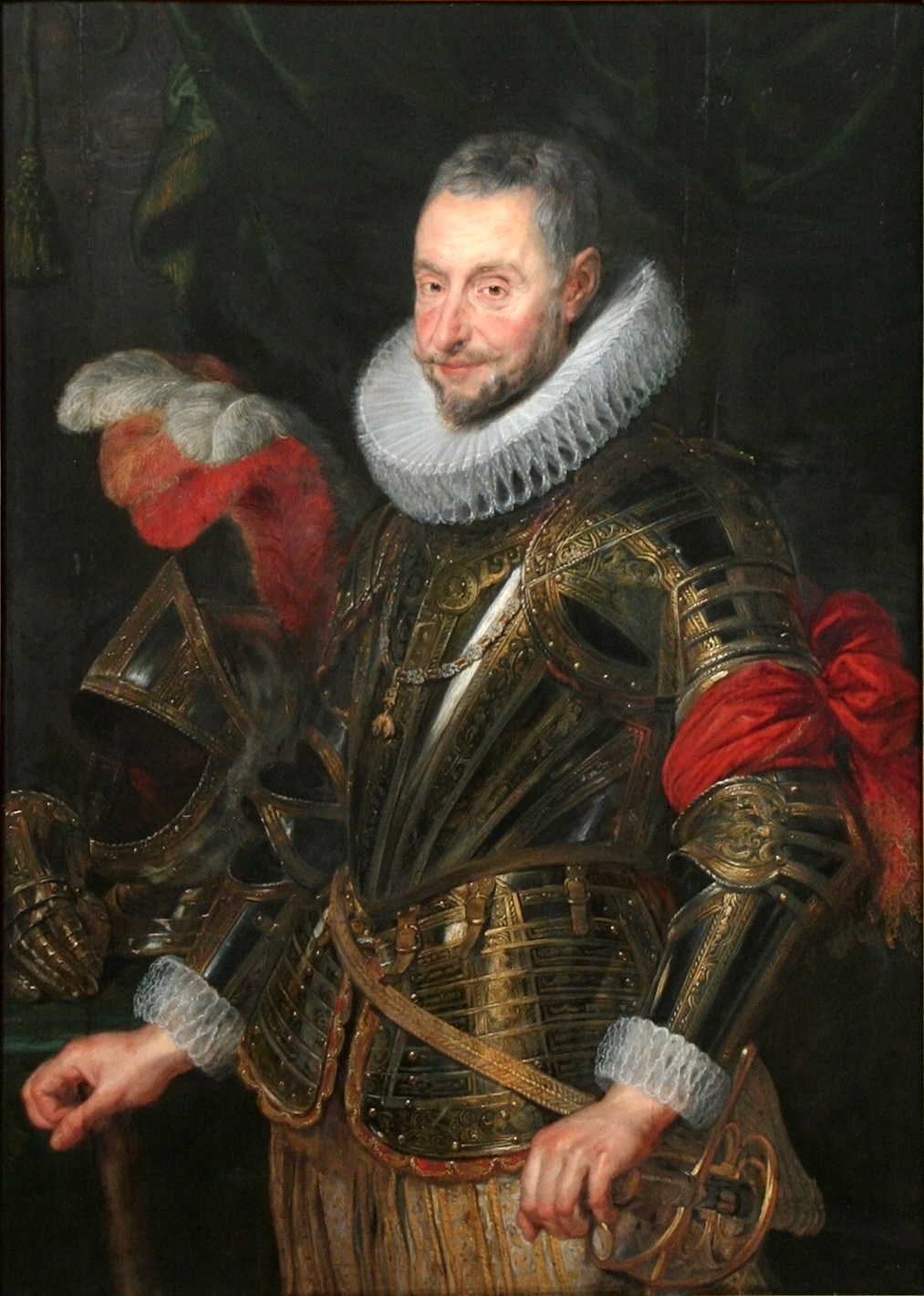
Ambrogio Spinola, marquis of Los Balbases, by Peter Paul Rubens.

By the turn of the century, however, the conflict began to reach a stalemate. After the accession of Philip III in Spain and of the Archdukes Albert and Isabella in the Habsburg Netherlands in 1598, the Army of Flanders tried to regain the initiative with a new offensive against the Dutch Republic. While it met with a tactical defeat in the Battle of Nieuwpoort on 2 July 1600, it did succeed in its strategic goal to repel the Dutch invasion of Flanders. The lengthy siege of Ostend (1601–1604) amply demonstrated the balance of power. Both sides poured enormous resources into the besieging or defending of a town that was reduced to rubble. Ambrogio Spinola, who had succeeded Archduke Albert as commander in the field, eventually captured the town on 22 September 1604, but only at the price of accepting the loss of Sluis.

Meanwhile, Habsburg diplomacy had managed to disengage from two fronts. In 1598 Henry IV and Philip II had ended the Franco-Spanish War with the Peace of Vervins, thus breaking up the Triple Alliance between France, England and the United Provinces. Six years later, James I, Philip III and the Archdukes concluded the Anglo-Spanish conflict with the Treaty of London. Together, these treaties allowed the Habsburgs to concentrate their resources on the war against the Dutch in the hope of delivering a decisive strike. The following year, Spinola seized the initiative, bringing the war north of the Great Rivers for the first time since 1594. Suddenly, the Dutch Republic had the enemy threatening its heartland. By 1606, the Spanish army had captured Oldenzaal, Lochem, Lingen, Rijnberk and Groenlo despite the efforts of Maurice of Nassau. However, the Republic's allies continued to offer their material support. Moreover, Habsburg successes in the Low Countries came at a heavy price. The Spanish did not deliver the knockout blow they had hoped for, while the Dutch East India Company made serious inroads into the Portuguese spice trade, by setting up bases in the Moluccas. These advances signaled that the conflict might spread further into the Spanish overseas empire. On 9 November 1607, Philip III announced a suspension of payments. The balance of power had led to a balance of exhaustion. After decades of war, both sides were finally prepared to open negotiations.

== Conferences ==
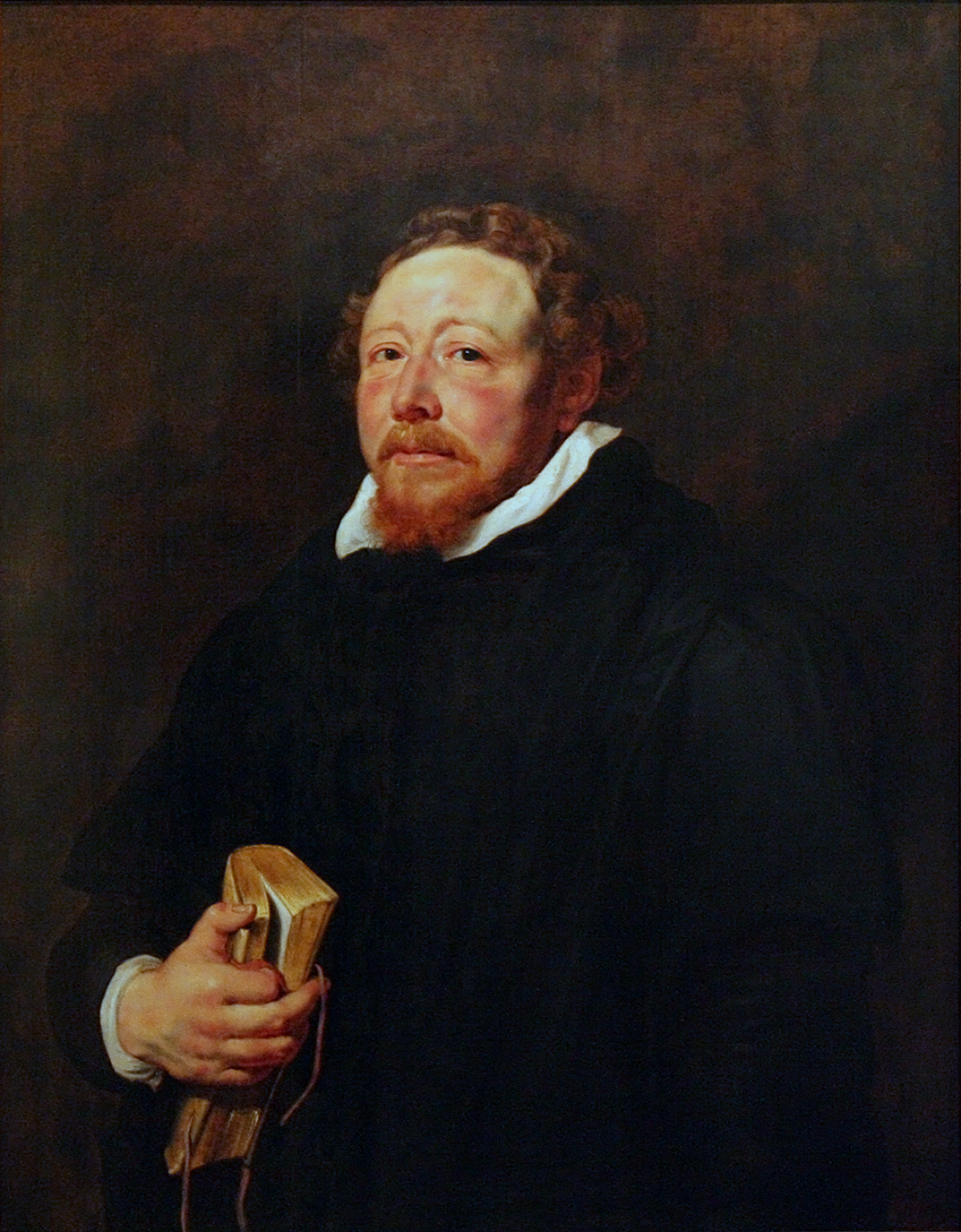
Father Jan Neyen by Peter Paul Rubens.

The two opposing sides started putting out discrete overtures early in the campaign season of 1606. The contacts were intensified when Albert instructed Father Jan Neyen in March 1607 to seek out the preliminaries that would have to be met for formal negotiations. Raised a Protestant, Neyen had converted to Catholicism in the 1580s and joined the Franciscan Order. The move did not however seem to have cost him his longstanding access to Maurice of Nassau, a fact that made him a valuable intermediary. Under the guise of visiting his mother in the United Provinces, Neyen travelled between Brussels and The Hague. The States-General of the Republic insisted on a preliminary recognition of their independence by the diplomatic acknowledgement of the Dutch delegation as legitimate representatives of the Dutch Republic, to which Albert consented, be it with significant reservations.

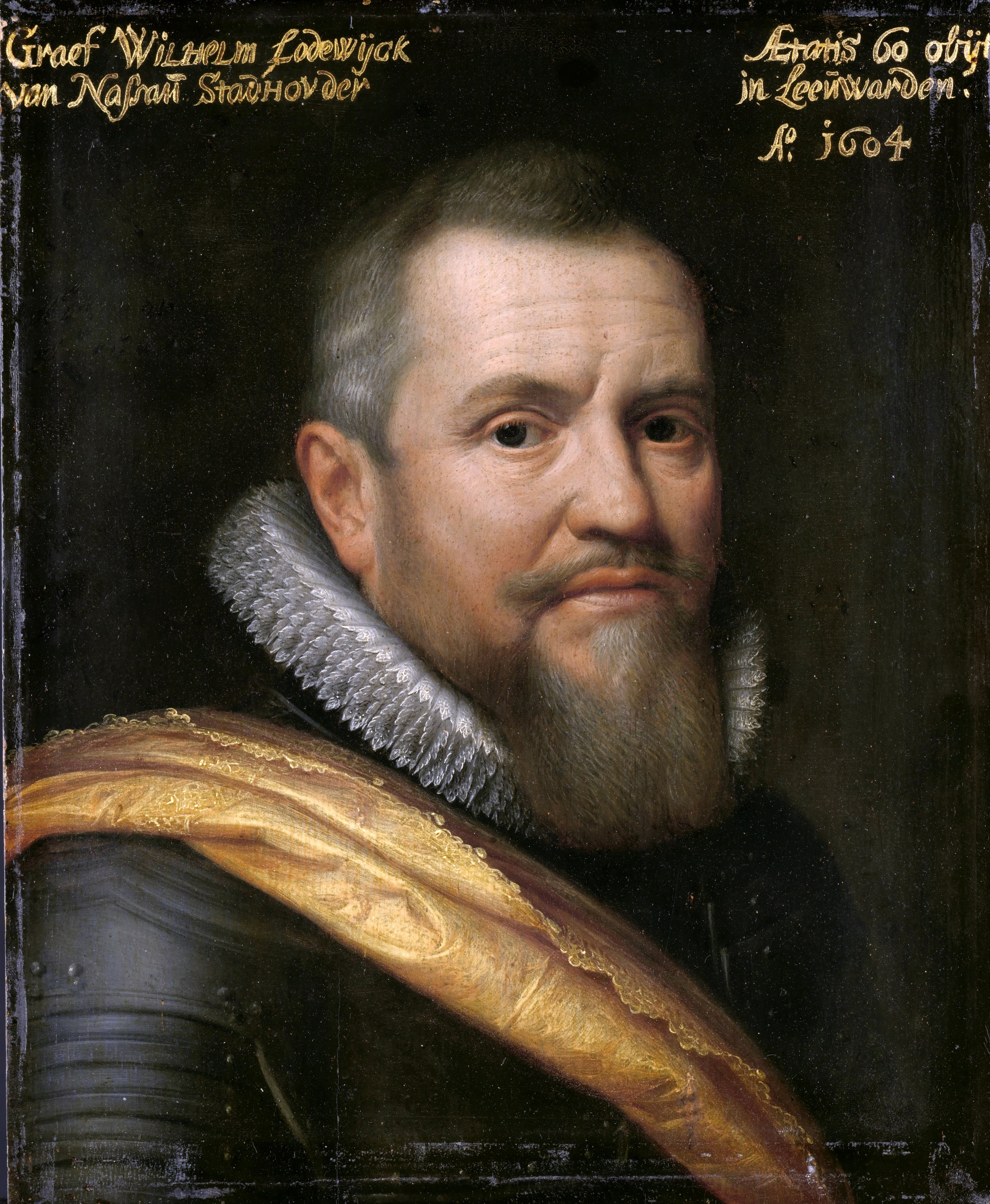
The Frisian Stadtholder Count William Louis by Michiel Jansz. van Mierevelt.

On 12 April 1607 the United Provinces and the Habsburg Netherlands agreed to a ceasefire, valid for eight months and taking effect on 4 May. The ceasefire was later extended to include operations at sea. Even then it was difficult to obtain the assent of Philip III. The King was appalled by Albert's readiness to concede on the point of independence. Only the desperate situation of Spain's finances compelled him to ratify the agreement. The ceasefire would be prolonged several times to allow for the negotiations that would eventually lead to the signing of the Twelve Years' Truce.

The peace conference opened in The Hague on 7 February 1608. The negotiations took place in the Binnenhof, in a room that has since been known as the Trêveszaal. As Maurice declined to take part in the conference, the leadership of the delegation of the Republic was given to his cousin William Louis of Nassau, the Stadtholder of Friesland, Groningen and Drenthe. The chief negotiator on the Dutch side was the influential Land's Advocate of Holland, Johan van Oldenbarnevelt. The delegation of the Habsburg Netherlands was led by Ambrogio Spinola. Its leading participant was the Chief-President Jean Richardot. They were assisted by Neyen, the Secretary of State and War, Don Juan de Mancicidor, and the Audiencier Louis Verreycken. There was no separate delegation for the King of Spain. The delegates of the Archdukes were empowered to negotiate on his behalf.

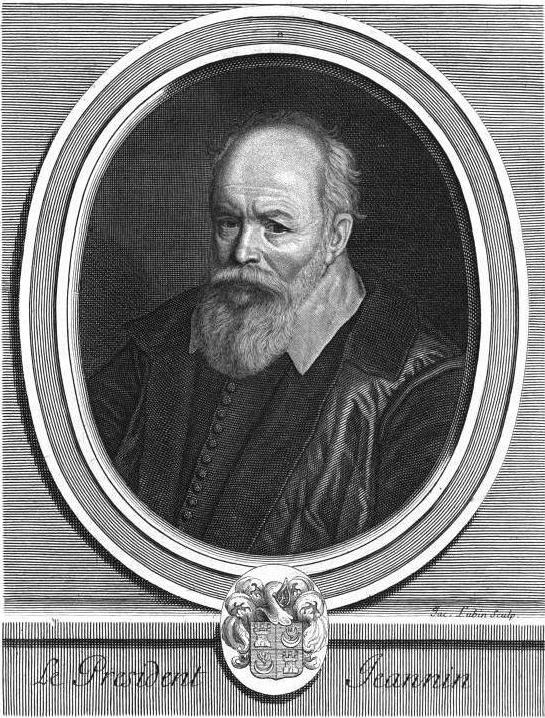
President Pierre Jeannin, a posthumous engraving by Jacques Lubin.

A number of princes sent delegations to the conference. The French team of mediators was led by the experienced negotiator and president of the Parlement of Dijon, Pierre Jeannin. The English delegation was headed by the ambassador in The Hague and future Secretary of State Ralph Winwood. King Christian IV of Denmark sent his future Chancellor Jacob Ulfeldt. Other mediators represented the Palatinate, Brandenburg, Ansbach and Hesse-Kassel. The Elector of Cologne and the Duke of Jülich and Cleves sent observers. Most of these delegates left as the conference dragged on, with only the French and English mediators staying on until the end.

The conference failed to come to an agreement on the terms of a peace treaty and broke up on 25 August. The parties were unable to compromise in matters of colonial trade and religion. To safeguard the Spanish Empire, the Habsburgs demanded that the Dutch would cease all navigation south of the Equator. It was a price that the mercantile United Provinces refused to pay. The demand inspired Hugo Grotius to publish his famous Mare Liberum in defense of the Dutch refusal. The United Provinces likewise rejected the Habsburg demand that the Catholics in the Republic would be given freedom of religion, considering it an interference in their domestic affairs. In spite of these setbacks, the French and English mediators nevertheless succeeded to convince the two sides to settle for a lengthy truce. It would preserve the peace, while remaining silent on all contentious subjects. After considering longer and shorter periods, the term of the truce was set for twelve years.

Formal talks were resumed on 28 March 1609 at the Antwerp City Hall. On 9 April the two delegations set their signatures to the text. The ratification process proved difficult. In the Republic, towns such as Amsterdam and Delft feared that the truce would diminish their trade. The States of Zeeland resented the loss of income from privateering and insisted on maintaining the blockade of the Scheldt. Philip III had his own reasons to refuse. It took several missions from the Archducal Court before he was prepared to ratify the treaty on 7 July 1609.

== Content ==
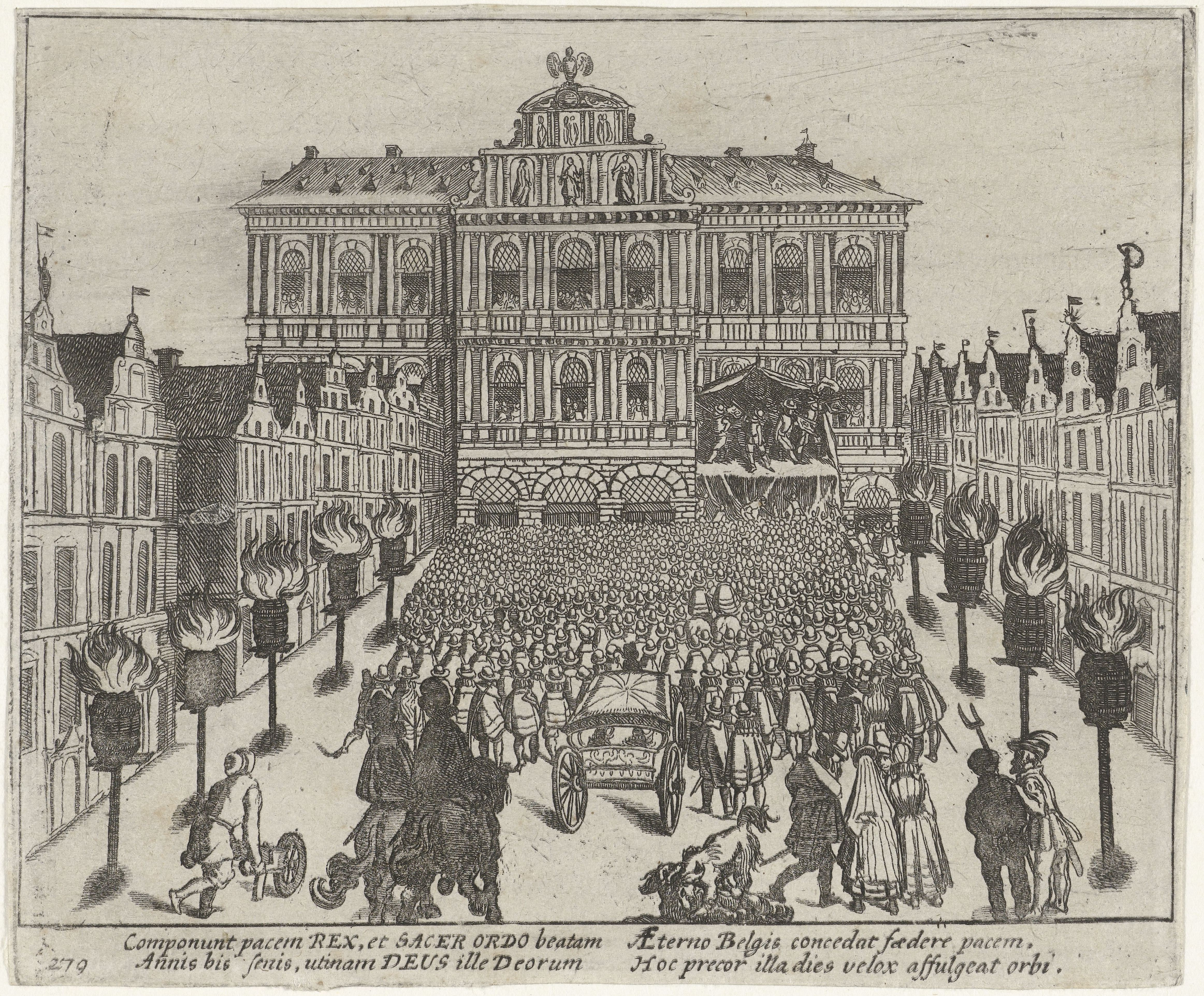
The publication of the Twelve Years' Truce at Antwerp City Hall, by Michiel Collijn.

The Habsburgs agreed to treat the United Provinces like an independent state for the duration of the truce. The wording of the article was ambiguous. The Dutch version of the agreement stated more or less that the independence of the Republic had been recognized, while the French text suggested that the Republic would be treated as if it were independent.

All hostilities would cease for twelve years. The two parties would exercise their sovereignty in the territories that they controlled on the date on the agreement. Their armies would no longer levy contributions in enemy territory, all hostages would be set free. Privateering would be stopped, with both parties repressing acts of piracy against the other. Trade would resume between the former belligerents. Dutch tradesmen or mariners would be given the same protection in Spain and the Archducal Netherlands as enjoyed by Englishmen under the Treaty of London. This meant that they could not be prosecuted for their beliefs, unless they gave offense to the local population. For their part, the Dutch agreed to end the blockade of the Flemish coast, but refused to allow free navigation on the Scheldt.

Exiles from the Southern Netherlands were allowed to return, but would have to conform to Catholicism. Estates that had been seized during the war would be restituted or their value would be compensated. A number of aristocratic families stood to gain from this article, with Maurice of Nassau and his siblings foremost among them. The practicalities of the restitution were agreed upon in a separate treaty dated 7 January 1610.

The agreement was silent on the issue of trade with the Indies. It did not endorse the Spanish claim to exclusive rights of navigation, nor did it back the Dutch thesis that it could trade or settle wherever there was no previous occupation by either the Spanish or the Portuguese. The truce did not alleviate the situation of Catholics in the Republic, or that of Protestants in the Habsburg Netherlands. Although they were not actively persecuted, they could not profess their religion in public and remained excluded from public office.

== Consequences ==
=== Developments in the Dutch Republic ===
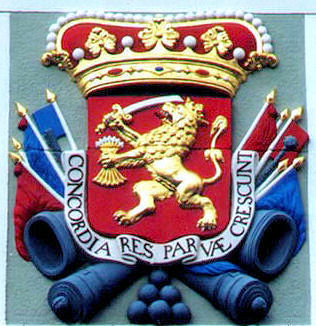
Arms adopted by the Dutch Republic to mark the recognition of its sovereignty after the Twelve Years' Truce.

The immediate result for the Republic was that it was now officially recognised by other European states as a sovereign state. To mark the recognition of the independence of the United Provinces, the States-General added a closed crown with two arches to their arms. Soon after the truce commenced, the Dutch emissaries in Paris and London were accorded full ambassadorial status. The Republic established diplomatic ties with the Republic of Venice, the Sultanate of Morocco, and the Ottoman Empire. A network of consuls was set up in the main ports. On 17 June 1609 France and England signed a treaty guaranteeing the independence of the Republic. To protect their interests in the Baltic, the United Provinces signed a defensive pact with the Hanseatic League in 1614 that was intended to deter Danish aggression.

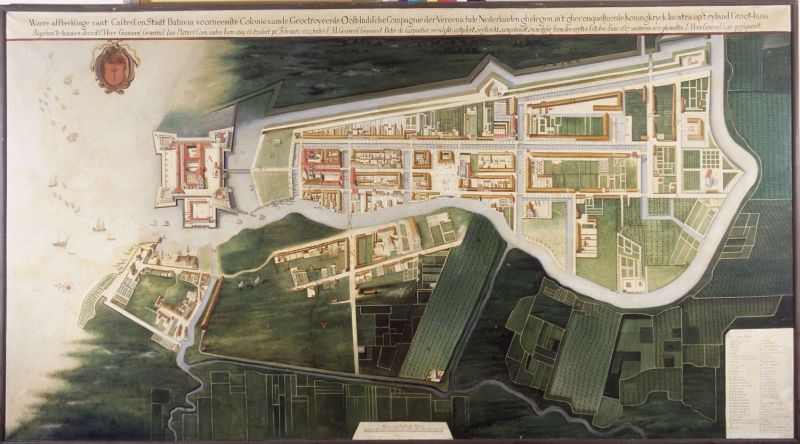
Plan of Batavia in 1627.

The truce did not halt Dutch colonial expansion. The United East India Company established its presence on the island of Solor, founded the town of Batavia on the island of Java, and gained a foothold on the Coromandel Coast in Pulicat. In the New World, the Republic encouraged the colonization of New Netherland. The Dutch merchant navy expanded rapidly, asserting itself on new routes, particularly in the Mediterranean.

The official embargo on trade with the Americas had ended, but the colonists now imposed their own unofficial one, limiting Dutch trade with Caracas and the Amazon region. Temporary setbacks in the Indies caused the price of VOC shares on the Amsterdam Stock Exchange to fall from a high of 200 in 1608 to 132 after the truce began. The Zeeland transit traffic to the Southern Netherlands declined sharply. On the other hand, the lifting of the Dutch blockade of Antwerp and the Flemish coast helped revive the trade in Flemish textile products, just as the Flemish textile industry experienced a revival itself.

Despite the truce, in 1614 the Dutch Captain Joris van Spilbergen sailed beyond the Strait of Magellan with an expedition of five ships, and raided the Spanish settlements on the coast of New Spain and South America. He fought the Spanish at Callao, Acapulco and Navidad.

In the Republic, ports profited from the expansion of trade. In contrast, brewing towns such as Delft, and textile producing centers like Leiden and Gouda, suffered from the competition of goods produced more cheaply in the Habsburg Netherlands.

==== Remonstrants and Counter-Remonstrants ====
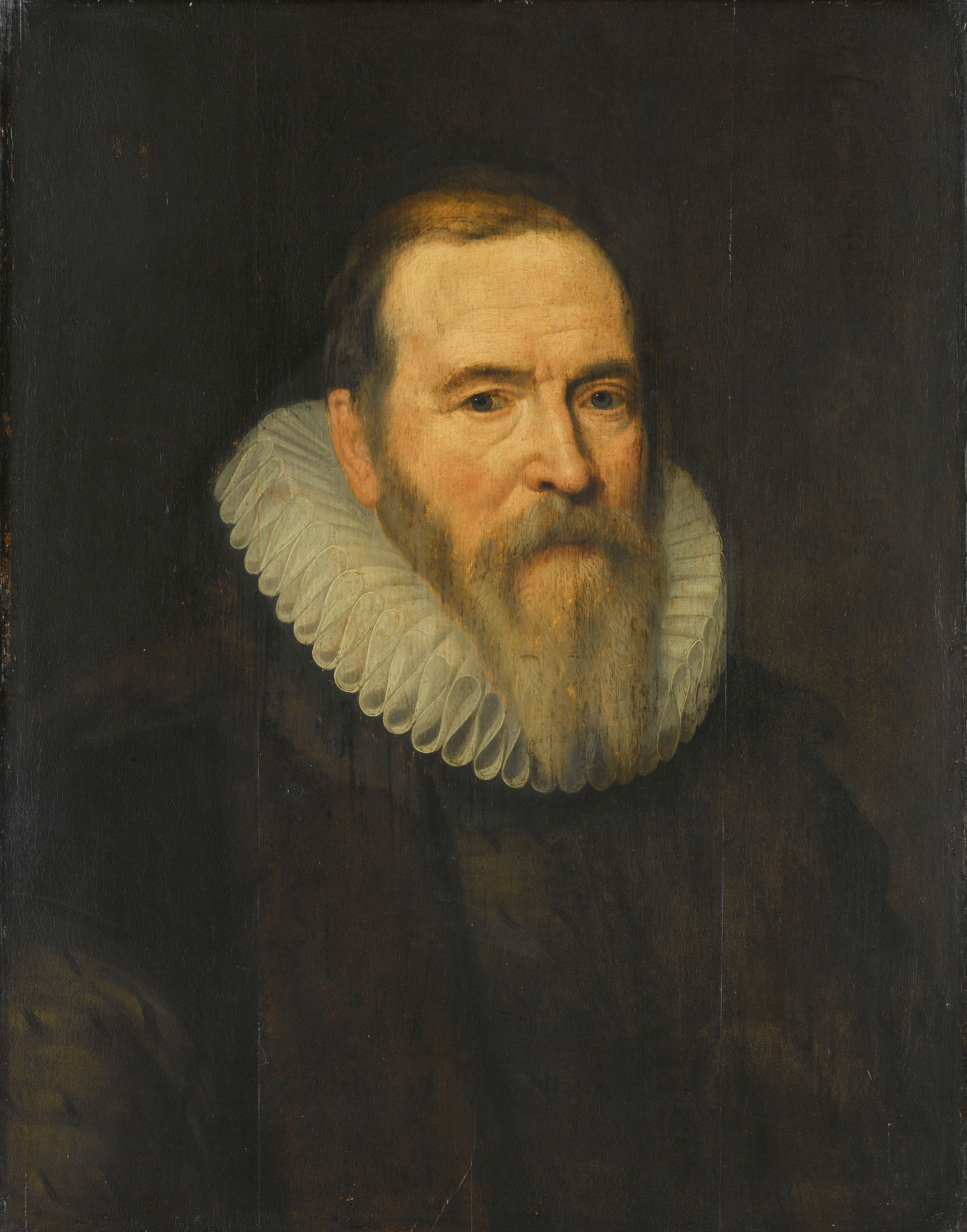
Johan van Oldenbarnevelt by Michiel Jansz van Mierevelt.

During the Truce, two factions emerged in the Dutch Republic. The divisions separating them were religious as well as political. The unity of the Dutch Reformed Church was threatened by a controversy that found its origins in the opposing views of Jacobus Arminius and Franciscus Gomarus on predestination.

Arminius' less rigid views appealed to the well-to-do merchants of Holland. They were also popular among the regents dominating the political life of that province, because they offered the prospect of an inclusive church controlled by the state. Johan van Oldenbarnevelt and Hugo Grotius were among the principal supporters.

The strict interpretations of Gomarus stood for a church of the elect, independent of outside control. They appealed to the industrious strata of the manufacturing towns as well as to exiles from the Southern Netherlands who were excluded from political power, adding an element of social conflict to the controversy.

In many towns congregations split between Remonstrants seeking to moderate the Belgic Confession, and Counter-Remonstrants who were strict Calvinists, insisting on its rigid interpretation. On 23 September 1617 Stadtholder Maurice of Orange openly sided with the Counter-Remonstrants. Maurice and many of the counter-Remonstrants had mixed feelings about the truce. Maurice was opposed to some of the measures of the truce and wanted full independence for the Dutch Republic. He favoured continuing the war until a total Spanish defeat that led to an unquestionable freedom for the Republic.

In an attempt to force the issue, Remonstrant regents used their sway over local authorities to recruit mercenaries with the "Sharp Resolution" of 4 August 1617, which authorised city governments to raise mercenary armies, the so-called waardgelders, outside the federal army or civic militias, to maintain public order. This drew an immediate protest from Maurice and from the other provinces on constitutional grounds. They asserted that the Union of Utrecht prohibited the raising of troops by individual cities without consent from the States General. Even more threatening to the federal supremacy had been the provision in the Sharp Resolution that asserted that units in the federal army paid for the account of Holland owed their primary allegiance to that province. This was a restatement of Holland's old constitutional position that the provinces were supremely sovereign, and the Union no more than a confederation of sovereign provinces. Maurice, and the other provinces (except Utrecht), now claimed that the States General possessed an overriding sovereignty in matters of common defence and foreign policy

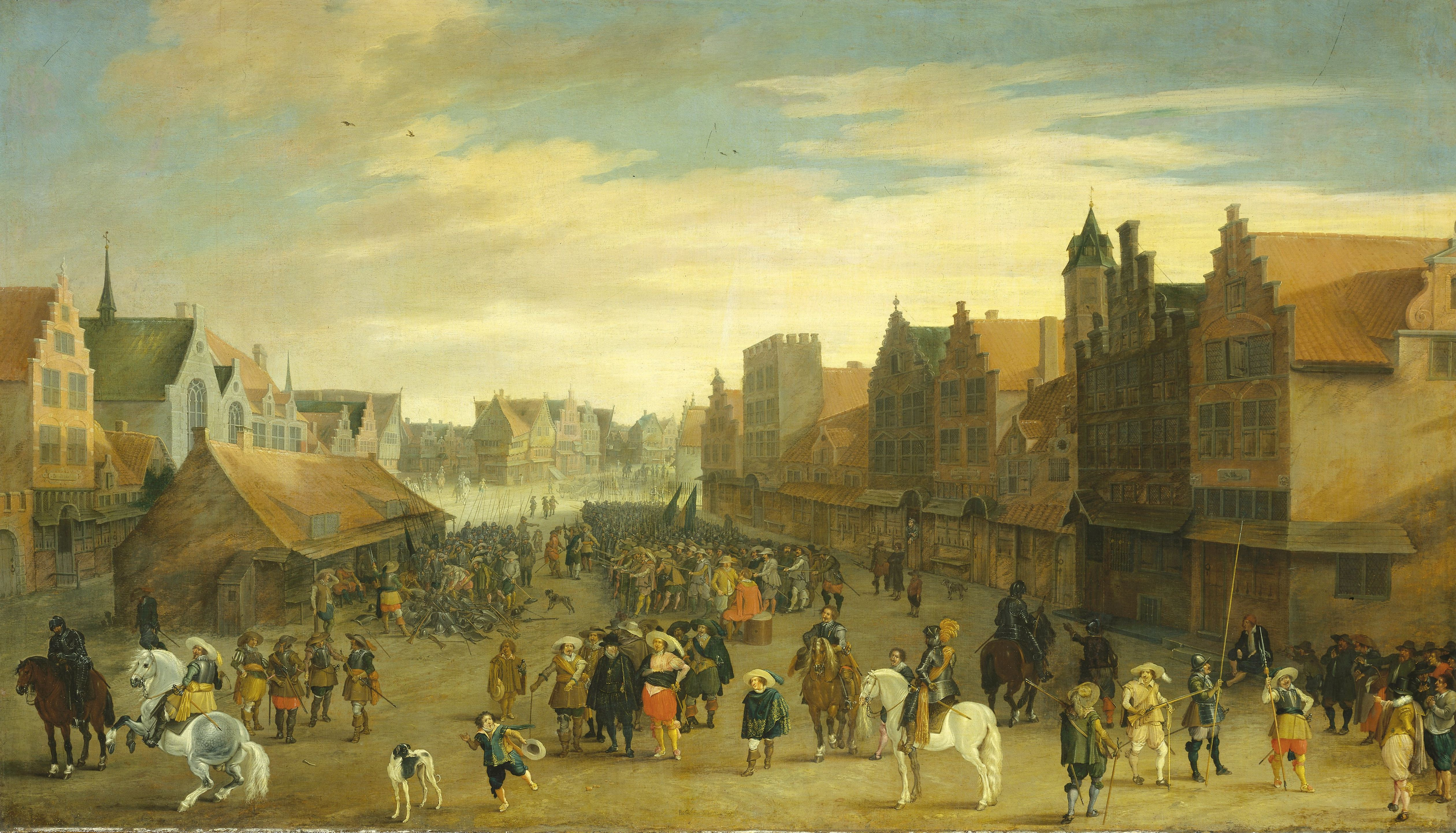
Maurice, Prince of Orange disbands the waardgelders (municipal mercenary army) on the Neude (town square) in Utrecht on 31 July 1618, by Paulus van Hillegaert

Maurice now mobilised the support of the five provinces opposing Holland and Utrecht for a States General resolution disbanding the waardgelders. This was voted through on 9 July 1618, with five votes to two, Holland and Utrecht opposing. Van Oldenbarnevelt and Grotius, in desperation, now overplayed their hand: appealing to the requirement for unanimity in the Union treaty, they sent a delegation to the federal troops in Utrecht (that were supposed to disarm the waardgelders in that city) with instructions that their first allegiance was to the province that paid them, and that they were to ignore instructions by the stadtholder in case of conflict. This intervention was construed by their opponents as treason. Prince Maurice now brought up additional federal troops to Utrecht and started to disarm the waardgelders there on 31 July 1618. There was no resistance. The political opposition to his actions imploded as van Oldenbarnevelt's Utrecht ally, Gilles van Ledenberg, advocaat of the Utrecht States, fled to Holland.

On 29 August 1618 Maurice had Oldenbarnevelt and other leaders of the Remonstrants arrested and then proceeded to purge the Holland ridderschap and the vroedschappen of a number of cities that had been governed by Remonstrant regents up to then. He replaced the old regents with adherents of the Counter-Remonstrant faction, often nouveau riche merchants that had little experience in government affairs. These purges constituted a political revolution and ensured that his Orangist regime would be securely in charge of the Republic for the next 32 years. Henceforth the stadtholder, not the Advocate of Holland, would direct the affairs of the Republic, mainly through his parliamentary managers in the Holland ridderschap. The Holland leadership was emasculated by making sure that the position of Grand Pensionary would henceforth be filled by Orangists.

Oldenbarnevelt was tried and executed. Others, such as Grotius, were imprisoned in Castle Loevestein. Meanwhile, the Synod of Dort upheld the strict interpretation of predestination and declared Arminianism heretical. Arminian theologians such as Johannes Wtenbogaert went into exile, where they set up a separate Remonstrant Church.

=== Developments in the Spanish monarchy ===
The truce gave Spain breathing space in the Low Countries. Overseas, the Dutch shifted their onslaught against Iberian positions toward Portugal rather than Spain. Despite this, in Spain it was widely perceived as an immense affront to its prestige. The Dutch emerged as the most favoured party which reflected political and ideological defeat. Spanish councillors opposed renewing the truce in order to preserve Spain's reputation as a great power and renew the war. The terms of the 1609 truce that the Spanish found objectionable not only included the virtual recognition of Dutch independence but also the closure of the river Scheldt to traffic in and out of Antwerp, and the acceptance of Dutch commercial operations in the Spanish and Portuguese colonial maritime lanes. A defeat for Spain was essentially a defeat for Castile, for it was Castile which provided the policy and the maintenance of the empire.

For the time of its duration, however, the truce allowed Philip and Francisco de Sandoval y Rojas, 1st Duke of Lerma to disengage from the conflict in the Low Countries and devote their energies to the internal problems of the Spanish monarchy. Nevertheless, Philip also longed to expunge the truce through a vigorous resumption of war.

=== Developments in the Southern Netherlands ===
The Southern Netherlands benefited from the truce. Agriculture was at last allowed to recover from the devastation of war. The archducal regime encouraged the reclaiming of land that had been inundated in the course of the hostilities and sponsored the impoldering of the Moeren, a marshy area that is presently astride the Belgian–French border. The recovery of agriculture led in turn to a modest increase of the population after decades of demographic losses. Repairing the damage to churches and other buildings helped to boost demand. Industry and in particular the luxury trades likewise underwent a recovery. Other sectors, such as textiles and breweries, benefitted from comparatively lower wages than those of the Dutch Republic. International trade was however hampered by the closure of the river Scheldt. The archducal regime had plans to bypass the blockade with a system of canals linking Ostend via Bruges to the Scheldt in Ghent and joining the Meuse to the Rhine between Venlo and Rheinberg. In order to combat urban poverty, the government supported the creation of a network of mounts of piety based on the Italian model.

Meanwhile, the archducal regime ensured the triumph of the Counter-Reformation in the Habsburg Netherlands. Most Protestants had by that stage left the region. Under the terms of legislation passed shortly after the truce, the remaining Protestant population was tolerated, provided they did not worship in public. Engaging in religious debates was also forbidden by law. The resolutions of the Third Provincial Council of Mechelen of 1607 were likewise given official sanction. Through such measures and by the appointment of a generation of able and committed bishops, Albert and Isabella laid the foundation of the Catholic confessionalisation of the population.

== Resumption of hostilities ==
More than once it looked as if the truce was about to collapse. The succession crisis over the United Duchies of Jülich-Cleves-Berg resulted in severe tensions during the siege of Jülich (1610) and the confrontations that led to the Treaty of Xanten in 1614.

Petrus Peckius the Younger led a failed attempt at renewing the truce in 1621. When it expired, the Eighty Years' War resumed.

== Sources ==
- Allen, Paul C. (2000). Philip III and the Pax Hispanica, 1598–1621: The Failure of Grand Strategy. Yale University Press. ISBN 0-300-07682-7.
- Anderson, Alison Deborah (1999). On the Verge of War: International Relations and the Jülich-Kleve Succession Crisis, 1609–1614. Humanities Press. ISBN 0-391-04092-8.
- Borschberg, Peter (2011). Hugo Grotius, the Portuguese and Free Trade in the East Indies. NUS Press and KITLV Press. ISBN 9789971695194.
- Eysinga, Willem Jan Marie (1959). De wording van het Twaafjarig Bestand van 9 april 1609. Noord-Hollandsche Uitgevers Maatschappij.
- García García, Bernardo J., ed. (2009). Tiempo de paces: La Pax Hispanica y la Tregua de los Doce Años. Sociedad estatal de conmemoraciones culturales. ISBN 978-84-92827-07-7.
- Goodman, David (2003). Spanish Naval Power, 1589-1665: Reconstruction and Defeat. Cambridge University Press. ISBN 9780521522571.
- Groenveld, Simon (2009). Het Twaalfjarig Bestand, 1609-1621, De jongelingsjaren van de Republiek der Verenigde Nederlanden. Haags Historisch Museum. ISBN 978-90-72550-05-7.
- Israel, Jonathan (1982). The Dutch Republic and the Hispanic World, 1606–1661. Clarendon. ISBN 978-0-19-821998-9.
- Israel, Jonathan (1995). The Dutch Republic: Its Rise, Greatness, and Fall 1477–1806. Oxford: Clarendon Press. ISBN 0-19-873072-1.
- Israel, Jonathan (1998). The Dutch Republic: Its Rise, Greatness and Fall, 1477–1806. Oxford University Press. ISBN 978-0-19-820734-4.
- Parker, Geoffrey (1977). The Dutch Revolt. Penguin Books.
- Poelhekke, Jan Joseph (1960). 't Uytgaen van den treves: Spanje en de Nederlanden in 1621. J.B. Wolters.
- Limm, P (2014). The Dutch Revolt 1559–1648. Routledge. ISBN 9781317880585.
- Pérez, Yolanda Rodríguez (2008). The Dutch Revolt Through Spanish Eyes: Self and Other in Historical and Literary Texts of Golden Age Spain (c. 1548–1673). Peter Lang. ISBN 9783039111367.
- Van Deursen, A.Th. (1974). Bavianen en slijkgeuzen: Kerk en kerkvolk ten tijde van Maurits en Oldenbarnevelt. Van Gorcum & Co.
