= Four Power (disambiguation) =

There have been a number of Four Power also called Quadripartite agreements and structures:

- The Four-Power Treaty, made at the Washington Naval Conference November 1921 to February 1922.
- The Four-Power Pact was an international treaty initialed on June 7, 1933, signed on July 15, 1933.
- The Four Powers represented in the Allied Control Council as the military occupation governing body in Germany after the end of World War II.
- Four-Power Authorities, operated by the Allied Control Council
- Council of Foreign Ministers (When France joined the Council in 1946)
- The Four Power Agreement on Berlin signed on 3 September 1971
