= Quadripartite Agreement =

Quadripartite Agreement, a treaty among four states or other parties, may refer to:

- Quadripartite Agreement (1933), or Four-Power Pact, signed by France, Britain, Italy, and Germany
- Quadripartite Agreement (1947), or UKUSA Agreement, signed by the United Kingdom and the United States, and later extended to other countries, concerning cooperation in signals intelligence
- Quadripartite Agreement (1971), or the Four Power Agreement on Berlin, between the United States, the Soviet Union, the United Kingdom, and France
- Quadripartite Agreement (1991), between Argentina, Brazil, the Brazilian-Argentine Agency for Accounting and Control of Nuclear Materials, and the International Atomic Energy Agency for the application of nuclear safeguards

== See also ==
- Four Power (disambiguation)
- Quadruple Alliance (disambiguation)
