= Dual Alliance =

Dual Alliance may refer to:

- The Dual Alliance (1879) between Germany and Austria-Hungary
- The Franco-Russian Alliance or Dual Alliance of 1894, between France and Tsarist Russia

== See also ==
- Triple Alliance (disambiguation)
