= Treaty of Paris (1815) =

Treaty ending the Napoleonic Wars

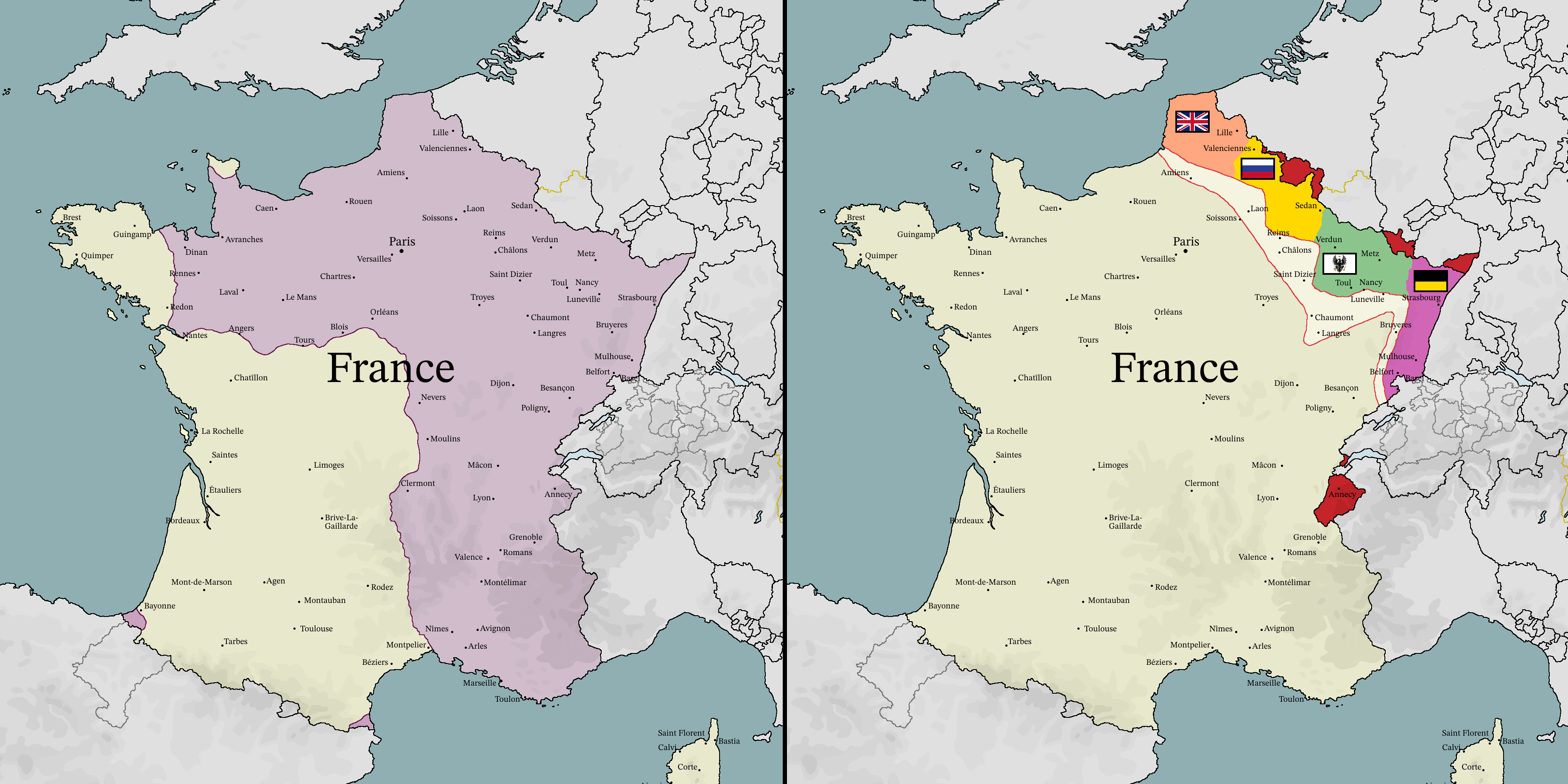
- Areas of France that were invaded during the War of the Seventh Coalition, between June and November 1815. The French territory around December 1815 until November 1818 British occupation zone Russian occupation zone Prussian occupation zone Austrian occupation zone Demilitarized zone Permanent territory loss
- Type: Bilateral treaty
- Signed: 20 November 1815
- Location: Paris, France
- Original signatories: France; United Kingdom; Austria; Prussia; Russia

Full text
- Treaty of Paris (1815) at Wikisource

The Treaty of Paris of 1815, also known as the Second Treaty of Paris, was signed on 20 November 1815, after the defeat and the second abdication of Napoleon Bonaparte. In February, Napoleon had escaped from his exile on Elba, entered Paris on 20 March and began the Hundred Days of his restored rule. After France's defeat at the hands of the Seventh Coalition at the Battle of Waterloo, Napoleon was forced to abdicate again, on 22 June. King Louis XVIII, who had fled the country when Napoleon arrived in Paris, took the throne for a second time on 8 July.

The 1815 treaty had more punitive terms than the treaty of the previous year. France was ordered to pay 700 million francs in indemnities, and its borders were reduced to those that had existed on 1 January 1790. France was to pay additional money to cover the cost of providing additional defensive fortifications to be built by neighbouring Coalition countries. Under the terms of the treaty, parts of France were to be occupied by up to 150,000 soldiers for five years, with France covering the cost. However, the Coalition occupation under the command of the Duke of Wellington was deemed necessary for only three years; the foreign troops withdrew from France in 1818 (Congress of Aix-la-Chapelle).

The total financial burden on France, including interest and upkeep for 150,000 soldiers, approached 1.7 billion francs, the most expensive war reparation ever paid by a country (in proportion to its GDP). In addition to the definitive peace treaty between France and Great Britain, Austria, Prussia and Russia, there were four additional conventions and an act confirming the neutrality of Switzerland, signed on the same day.

== Definitive treaty ==
In red, territories left to France in 1814 but removed after the Treaty of Paris of 1815.

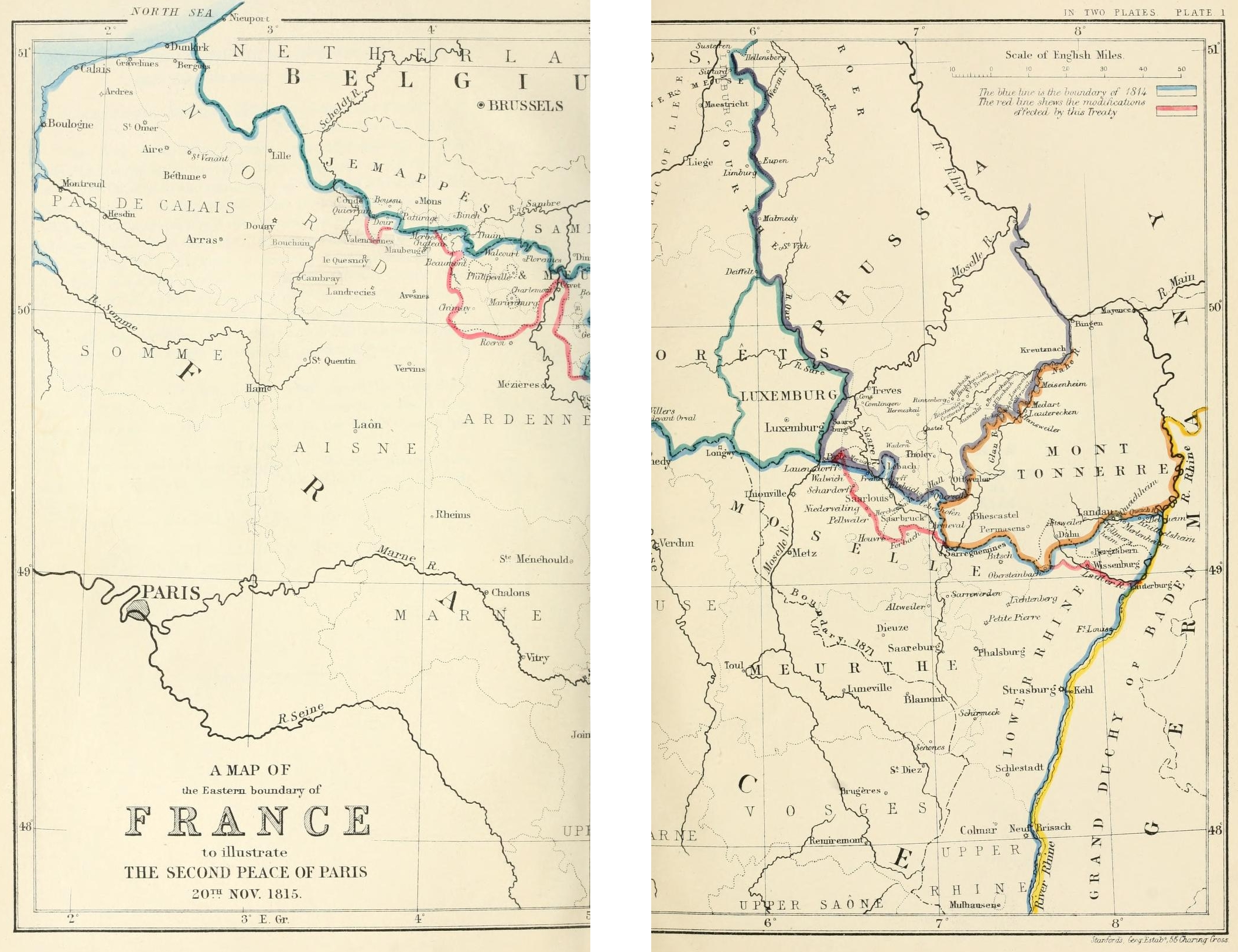
A map of the Eastern boundary of France to illustrate the Second Peace of Paris 20th Nov. 1815

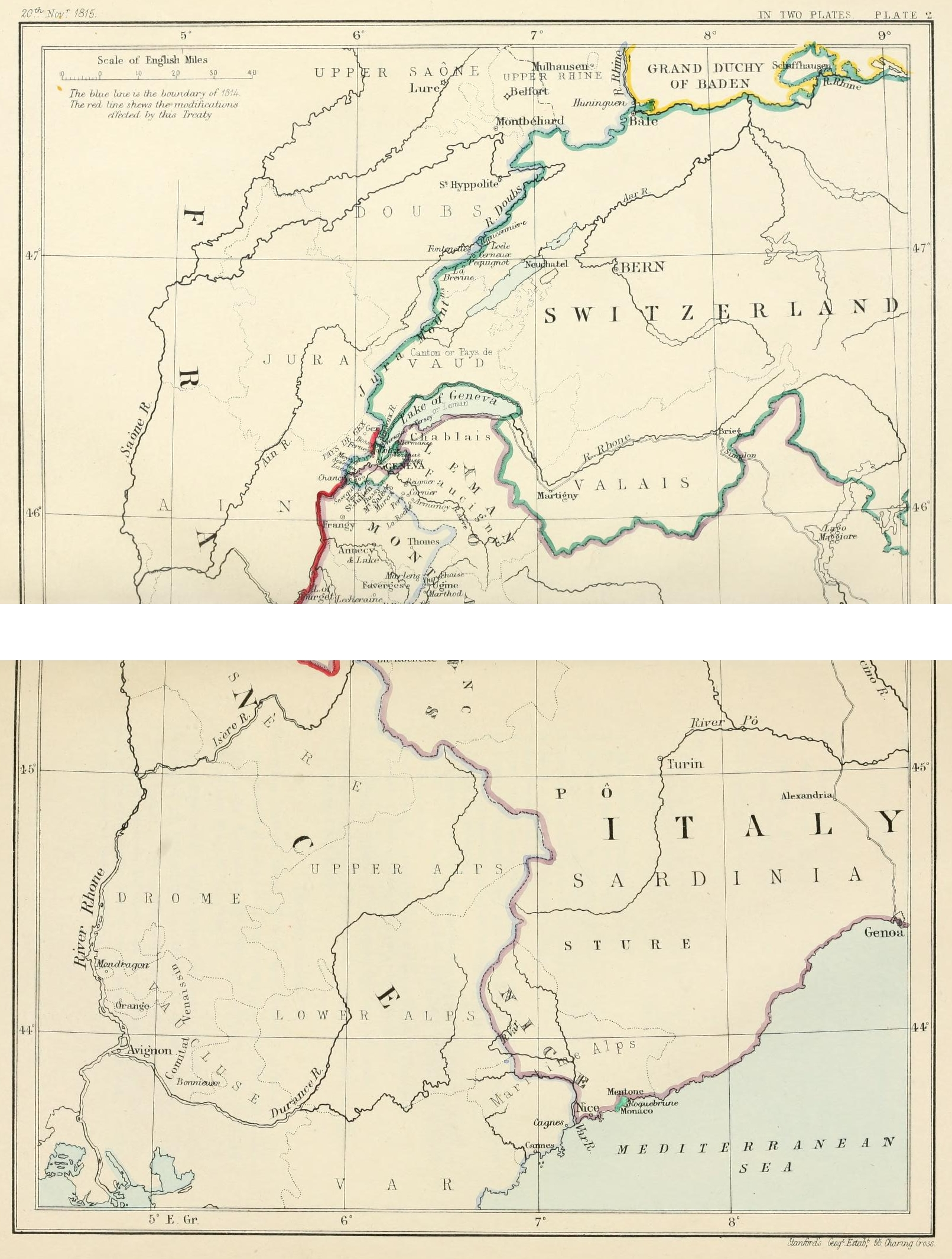
Southeast frontier of France after the Treaty of Paris, 1815

The 1815 peace treaties were drawn up entirely in French, the lingua franca of contemporary diplomacy. There were four treaties, between France and each of the four major Seventh Coalition powers: Austria, Great Britain, Prussia and Russia. All four treaties were signed on the same day (20 November 1815), had verbatim stipulations, and were styled the same way (for example the "Definitive Treaty between Great Britain and France").

While the first treaty of Paris had been signed after two months of negotiations, the second treaty took five months of heated and bitter discussions before being signed. The British and the Prussians, the victors of Waterloo, dominated discussions among the allies, while the Austrians, the Russians and the French took a back seat. The treaty could have been much harsher than it was since the Prussians, led by the general staff and supported by Marshal Blücher, adamantly demanded the cession of Alsace, Lorraine, the Saarland, Luxembourg and Savoy as well as a war indemnity of 1 200 000 000 francs. Thanks to Castlereagh, who now occupied the dominant position that had been held by the Tsar of Russia in 1814, and whose primary concern was to avoid the alienation of the French toward the restored Bourbons, the treaty of 1815 was only moderately harsher than the Treaty of 1814, which had been negotiated through the manoeuvre of Talleyrand.

With the new treaty, France lost the territorial gains of the Revolutionary armies in 1790–1792, which the previous treaty had allowed France to keep; the nation was reduced to its 1790 boundaries, plus the enclaves of the Comtat Venaissin, the County of Montbéliard and the Republic of Mulhouse, which France was allowed to keep, but minus a few patches of territory along the northern border, including the former duchy of Bouillon, annexed to France 1795, Landau and the Saarlouis exclave, which had been French since 1697, as well as six communes in the Pays de Gex which were ceded to the Canton of Geneva so that it be connected to the rest of Switzerland. France was now also ordered to pay 700 million francs in indemnities, in five yearly instalments, (Note: Article 9; the 1814 treaty had required only that France honour public and private debts incurred by the Napoleonic regime.) and to maintain at its own expense a Coalition army of occupation of 150,000 soldiers (Note: Articles 4 and 5.) in the eastern border territories of France, from the English Channel to the border with Switzerland, for a maximum of five years. The twofold purpose of the military occupation was rendered self-evident by the convention annexed to the treaty outlining the incremental terms by which France would issue negotiable bonds covering the indemnity: in addition to safeguarding the neighboring states from a revival of revolution in France, it guaranteed fulfilment of the treaty's financial clauses.

The treaty was signed for Great Britain by Robert Stewart, Viscount Castlereagh and the Duke of Wellington and by Armand-Emmanuel du Plessis, Duc de Richelieu for France; parallel treaties with France were signed by Austria, Russia, and Prussia, forming in effect the first confederation of Europe. The Quadruple Alliance was reinstated in a separate treaty also signed 20 November 1815, introducing a new concept in European diplomacy, the peacetime congress "for the maintenance of peace in Europe" on the pattern of the Congress of Vienna, which had concluded 9 June 1815.

The treaty is brief. In addition to having "preserved France and Europe from the convulsions with which they were menaced by the late enterprise of Napoleon Bonaparte", the signers of the Treaty also repudiated "the revolutionary system reproduced in France".

The treaty is presented "in the desire to consolidate, by maintaining inviolate the Royal authority, and by restoring the operation of the Constitutional Charter, the order of things which had been happily re-established in France". The first Treaty of Paris, of 30 May 1814, and the Final Act of the Congress of Vienna, of 9 June 1815, were confirmed. On the same day, in a separate document, Great Britain, Russia, Austria, and Prussia renewed the Quadruple Alliance. The princes and free towns, who were not signatories, were invited to accede to its terms, whereby the treaty became a part of the public law by which Europe, with the exclusion of the Ottoman Empire, (Note: Turkey had been excluded from the Congress of Vienna by the express wish of Russia.) established "relations from which a system of real and permanent balance of power in Europe is to be derived".

=== Article on the slave trade ===
An additional article appended to the treaty addressed the issue of slavery. It reaffirmed the Declaration of the Powers, on the Abolition of the Slave Trade, of 8th of February 1815 (which also formed ACT, No. XV. of the Final Act of the Congress of Vienna) and added that the governments of the contracting parties should "without loss of time, ... [find] the most effectual measures for the entire and definitive abolition of a Commerce so odious, and so strongly condemned by the laws of religion and of nature".

== Convention on pecuniary indemnity ==
A convention on pecuniary indemnity regulated the mode of liquidating the indemnity of 700 millions francs to be paid by France, in conformity to the fourth article of the treaty. The sum was to be paid, day by day, in equal portions, in the space of five years, from 1 December 1815.

Thus, France 51 francs every day for five years, equal to about 16,000 pounds sterling at the exchange rate of the day. For this daily quota, the French government had to give assignations on the French treasury, payable to bearer, day by day. In the first instance, however, the Coalition Commissioners were to receive the whole of the 700 million in fifteen bonds of 46 2/3 million each; the first of which was payable on 31 March 1816, the second on 21 July 1816, and so on, every fourth month. In the month preceding the commencement of each of these four monthly periods, France was to redeem successively one of these bonds for 46 2/3 millions, by exchanging it against the first-mentioned daily assignations payable to bearer, which assignations, for the purpose of convenience and negotiability, were again subdivided into coupures, or sets of smaller sums. As a guarantee for the regular payment of these assignations, and to provide for deficiencies, France assigned, moreover, to the allies, a fund of interest, to be inscribed in the Grand Livre of her public debt, of seven millions francs on a capital of 140 millions. A liquidation was to take place every six months, when the assignations duly discharged by the French Treasury were to be received as payments to their amount, and the deficiency arising from assignations not honoured would be made good, with interest, at five percent from the fund of interest inscribed in the Grand Livre, in a manner specified in this convention.

The distribution of the sum among the Coalition Powers, agreed to be paid by France in this convention, was regulated by a separate convention, the Protocol for the pecuniary indemnity to be furnished by France and the Table of allotment:

State		Francs	Total
Austria		100,000,000	
Russia		100,000,000	
Great Britain		100,000,000	
Prussia		100,000,000	
Subtotal			400,000,000
State	Men	Francs	
The German States, together with the Netherlands and Sardinia, a like sum of 100 million, to be shared at the rate of 425 francs 89 centimes and a fraction for each man furnished by them respectively: (Note: To divide up the sum of 100 million more precisely for this number of men the payment would be 426 francs 38.50 cents per man.)
Bavaria	60,000	25,517,798	
Netherlands	50,000	21,264,832	
Württemberg	20,000	8,505,932	
Baden	16,000	6,804,746	
Saxony	16,000	6,804,746	
Sardinia	15,000	6,379,419	
Hesse-Kassel	12,000	5,103,559	
Hanover	10,000	4,252,966	
Hesse-Darmstadt	8,000	3,408,373	
Mecklenburg-Schwerin	3,200	1,616,127	
Nassau	3,000	1,275,889	
Brunswick	3,000	1,275,889	
Hamburg & Bremen	3,000	1,275,889	
Saxe-Gotha	2,200	935,632	
Saxe-Weimar	1,600	680,474	
Anhalt	1,600	680,474	
Oldenburg	1,600	680,474	
Schwarzburg	1,300	552,885	
Lippe	1,300	552,885	
Reuss	900	382,766	
Mecklenburg-Strelitz	800	340,837	
Saxe Coburg	800	340,837	
Waldeck-Pyrmont	800	340,837	
Frankfurt	750	318,972	
Saxe-Meiningen	600	255,177	
Saxe-Hildburghausen	400	170,118	
Hohenzollern-Sigmaringen	386	164,164	
Hohenzollern-Hechingen	194	82,507	
Liechtenstein	100	42,529	
Subtotal	234,530		100,000,000
State		Francs	
Spain		5,000,000	
Portugal		2,000,000	
Denmark		2,500,000	
Switzerland		3,000,000	
Subtotal			12,500,000
Gratuity to the British and Prussian armies under Wellington and Blücher, for their exertions at Waterloo and their capture of Paris, 25 million each			50,000,000
State		Francs	
For the erection of fortresses against France:
Netherlands		60,000,000	
Prussia (besides Saarlouis, valued at 50 mill.)		20,000,000	
Bavaria		15,000,000	
Spain		7,500,000	
Sardinia		10,000,000	
To strengthen Mainz		5,000,000	
To erect a new fortress of the German Confederacy on the Upper Rhine (Note: Delayed until after the 1840 Rhine crisis. In 1841 the German Confederacy decided to erect two fortresses in Rastatt and Ulm.)		20,000,000	
Subtotal			137,500,000
Total in francs			700,000,000

== Convention on the military line ==
A convention on the military line regulated all matters concerning the temporary occupation of the frontiers of France by a Coalition army of 150,000 men, conforming to Article V of the definitive treaty. The military line to be occupied, would extend along the frontiers which separated the departments of the Pas de Calais, of the North of the Ardennes, of the Meuse, of the Moselle, of the Lower Rhine, and of the Upper Rhine, from the interior of France.

It was also agreed that neither the Coalition nor the French troops would occupy (unless for particular reasons and by mutual agreement), the following territories and districts:

- In the department of the Somme, all the country north of that river, from Ham, to where it falls into the sea;
- In Aisne, the districts of Saint-Quentin, Vervins and Laon;
- In the Marne, those of Rheims, Sainte-Menehould, and Vitry;
- In the Haute-Marne, those of Saint-Dizier and Joinville;
- In Meurthe, those of Toul, Dieuze, Sarrebourg and Blamont;
- In the Vosges, those of Saint-Dié, Bruyères and Remiremont;
- The district of Lure, in the Haute-Saône; and that of Saint-Hippolyte in Doubs.

Name	Men	Name	Men
Calais	1,000	Dunkirk and its forts	1,000
Gravelines	500	Douai and Fort de Scarpe	1,000
Bergues	500	Verdun	500
Saint-Omer	1,500	Metz	3,000
Béthune	500	Lauterbourg	150
Montreuil	500	Wissembourg	150
Hesdin	250	Lichtenberg	150
Ardres	150	Petite Pierre	100
Aire	500	Phalsbourg	600
Arras	1,000	Strasbourg	3,000
Boulogne	300	Sélestat	1,000
Saint-Venant	300	Neuf-Brisach and Fort Mortier	1,000
Lille	3,000	Belfort	1,000

Within the line occupied by the Coalition army, 26 fortresses were allowed to have garrisons (see the table on the right), but without any materiel or equipment of artillery and engineer stores.

France was to supply all the needs of the 150,000 Coalition troops who remained in the country. Lodging, fuel, light, provisions, and forage were to be furnished in kind, to an extent not exceeding 200,000 daily rations for men, and 50,000 daily rations for horses; and for pay, equipment, clothing, &c.

France was to pay to the Coalition 50 million francs per annum during the five-year occupation: the allies, however, were content with only 30 million, on account, for the first year. The territories and fortresses definitively ceded by France, as well as the fortresses to be provisionally occupied by the Coalition troops for five years, were to be given up to them within ten days from the signature of the principal treaty, and all the Coalition forces, except 150,000 which were to remain, were to evacuate France within 21 days from that date.

The direct expense entailed upon France by this convention greatly exceeded the 700 million francs of the indemnity. Estimating the value of the soldier's portion and allowances at 1 1/2 francs, and the cavalry ration at 2 francs, the annual cost of the deliveries in kind for 200,000 portions and 50,000 rations would have been 146 million in francs, which, with the addition of 50 million franc of money per annum, formed a total of 196 million francs per year, equal to 22,370 sterling per day at the exchange rate of the time.

== Convention on private claims upon France ==
A convention on private claims upon France assured the payment of money due by France to the subjects of the Coalition powers, in conformity with the treaty of 1814 and to the Article VIII of the 1815 peace treaty. There were twenty-six articles in the convention, which provided for the following:

- the liquidation of all claims arising from articles furnished by individuals, and partnerships, by virtue of contracts and other arrangements with French administrative authorities;
- arrears of pay to military persons or employees no longer subjects of France;
- deliveries to French hospitals;
- loans contracted by French military or civil authorities;
- losses of money confided to the French post-office etcetera;
- the restitution of the funds of the Hamburg bank, seized by Marshal Louis Nicolas Davout, to be regulated by a separate convention between commissioners from that city and those of Louis XVIII. This issue was already contentious and had been subject to secret articles in both of the 1814 Convention for a suspension of hostilities with France and the 1814 Paris Peace Treaty. The matter was settled when the French government agreed to pay compensation in a special convention signed by the parties on 27 October 1816.
- the payment of a claim of upwards of forty million francs to the Counts of Bentheim and Steinfurt.

All these claims were to be sent in within a year after the ratification of the treaty or they would be voided (Article XVI), and committees for their liquidation were to be appointed.

Articles XVII–XIX related to the payment of the claims and their inscription in the Grand Livre (general ledger). The claims under this convention were immense, so it was impossible for the parties to have a clear idea of the necessary amount at the time of the treaty's signing. As a guarantee of payment, Article XX provided that a capital, bearing 3 1/2 millions of francs in interest, be inscribed in the Grand Livre, the interest of which was to be received half yearly by joint-commissioners.

== Convention on claims of British subjects ==
A fourth convention related exclusively to the liquidation of the claims of British subjects on the government of France, in conformity with the Paris peace treaty of 1814, and the Article VIII of the Paris Peace Treaty of 1815. All British subjects who had suffered loss of property in France since 1 January 1791, by sequestration or confiscation by the French government, were to be indemnified. The amount of permanent stock lost was to be inscribed in the Grand Livre, and to bear interest from 22 March 1816; excepting, however, such holders as had, since 1797, voluntarily submitted to receive their dividends at a third. The same was to be the case in regard to former life annuities from the French government.

Indemnification was further granted for the loss of immovable property by sequestration, confiscation, or sale; and particular regulations were laid down for ascertaining its value in the fairest possible manner. A separate account was to be kept of arrears that had accrued for all types of property, for which arrears were to be calculated at an interest of four percent per annum. Movable properly, lost through the above causes, was also to be paid for by inscriptions according to its value, with interest calculated on it at three percent per annum. From this indemnity, however, were excluded ships, cargoes, and other movable property seized in conformity to the laws of war and the prohibitory decrees. All claims of the above, or any other description, were to be given in, within three months after the date of the signing fourth convention (20 November 1815) from Europe, six months from the western colonies, and twelve months from the East Indies, &c.

The claims were to be examined and decided on by a mixed commission of liquidation: and, if their votes were equal, an arbitrator would be chosen by lot from a mixed commission of arbitration. As a guarantee for the payment of claims sanctioned under this convention, there was to be inscribed in the Grand Livre, before 1 January 1816, a capital bearing 3 1/2 millions francs of interest, in the name of a further mixed commission of British and French officers, who were to receive such interest; without, however, disposing of the same otherwise than by placing it in the public funds, at accumulating interest for the benefit of the creditors. As soon as the inscription had been effected, Britain would restore the French colonies as agreed in the treaty of 1814, including the islands of Martinique and Guadeloupe, which had been provisionally re-occupied by the British troops.

== Act on the neutrality of Switzerland ==
The Swiss Confederation had been internationally recognised as an independent neutral state at the Peace of Westphalia in 1648. During the Napoleonic Wars it failed to remain neutral, as some cantons had been annexed into other states and, under French influence, the Act of Mediation was signed, replacing the Swiss Confederation with the more centralised Helvetic Republic, allied to France. With the fall of Napoleon in 1814, the cantons of Switzerland started the process of writing a new, less centralised constitution.

On 20 March 1815, at the Congress of Vienna, the European powers (Austria, France, Great Britain, Portugal, Prussia, Russia, Spain and Sweden) agreed to recognise permanently an independent, neutral Switzerland, and on 27 May Switzerland acceded to this declaration.

However, during Napoleon's Hundred Days the Seventh Coalition suspended the signing of the Act of Acknowledgement and Guarantee of the perpetual Neutrality of Switzerland until after Napoleon Bonaparte was defeated; this allowed Coalition forces to pass through Swiss territory. So with Article 84 of the Final Act of the Congress of Vienna dated 20 November 1815, the four major Coalition powers (Austria, Great Britain, Prussia and Russia) and France gave their formal and authentic acknowledgement of the perpetual neutrality of Switzerland.

== Return of looted art ==
Much art had been looted from across Europe by the French armies since 1793. The First Treaty of Paris had made no demands in this respect, but the second treaty required that stolen artworks be returned to their countries of origin. The process was haphazard, as some states had ceased to exist, but the treaty was one of the first in history to require the return of war booty on a large scale.

== See also ==
- List of treaties
- Neutralized Zone of Savoy
- History of Savoy from 1815 to 1860
- Belgium question
