= Triple Alliance (1596) =

1596 alliance between England, France, and the Netherlands

The Triple Alliance of 1596 (full title: Tract of alliance between England, France and the United Netherlands), was an alliance between England, France and the Republic of the Seven United Netherlands. The Republic joined as a third party to an earlier agreement between England and France, but the alliance did in fact not take effect until the Republic joined. By signing the treaty, France and England were the first states to recognize the Republic of the Seven United Netherlands as an independent state. The three parties in the alliance were all at war with Spain. There had been attempts to convince magnates from the Holy Roman Empire to join the alliance, but they did not want to enter the war against Spain. The alliance was in effect for only a few years.

== Situation ==
=== England ===
Elizabeth I had become queen of England in 1558. She was the successor of Mary I of England, who had conducted a reign of terror against Protestants in an attempt to restore the Catholic Church in England. Mary had married Philip II, the heir and later King of Spain, in her final years. Elizabeth I supported Protestants and over time began to see the Catholics as potential enemies and supporters of Philip II.

From the mid 1580s, England openly supported the revolt in the Netherlands, which started in 1568. Relations between Spain and England had long been tense. These tensions led to the breakout of the Anglo-Spanish War in 1585, and resulted in the destruction of the Spanish fleet and the failed invasion of England by the Spanish Armada in 1588. Since then Spain spent considerable effort to rebuild its fleet. Elizabeth's strategy was to destroy any new Spanish ships before they could take any action. Following this strategy, a combined Anglo-Dutch fleet successfully attacked the Spanish fleet at Cádiz, where, amongst other results, two Spanish warships were captured.

=== France ===
The Wars of Religion, a constantly resurging conflict between Catholics and Protestants, had been raging in France since 1562. In 1570 the Catholics and Protestants signed a peace treaty which would be sealed two years later, on August 18, 1572, by the marriage between the Protestant Henry of Navarre and the Catholic Marguerite de Valois, sister of the French King. On August 22, A few days after the marriage took place, a failed assassination attempt on the Protestant leader Admiral Gaspard de Coligny led to the St. Bartholomew's Day massacre. On the night of 23 to 24 August, thousands of French Protestants, including Coligny, were killed. The struggle between Catholics and Protestants erupted again in all its ferocity. Henry of Navarre was captured by the Catholics during the St. Bartholomew's Day massacre, and forced to convert to the Catholic faith. In 1576, after four years of imprisonment at the court, Henry of Navarre managed to escape. Fleeing to Protestant territory, he immediately reconverted to the Protestant faith.

Meanwhile, the Catholic League, led by Henry of Guise, a childhood friend of Henry III, began to worry about the succession. The Catholic King Henry III was childless, and after the death of his younger brother Francis of Anjou in 1584, according to the Salic Laws the Protestant Henry of Navarre was the next in line of succession, being a descendant of thirteenth-century King Louis IX. Within the Catholic faction, particularly among residents of Paris, there was support for a takeover of the throne by Henry of Guise. In 1588, after a military victory over Henry of Navarre, Guise entered Paris, where he was greeted royally by the people. Henry III was forced to withdraw to the Louvre. After the French States-General proved unwilling to support him against De Guise, Henry III had Guise assassinated on 23 December 1588. The following year he reconciled with Henry of Navarre. Together they defeated the radical Catholic armies of the Catholic League and then besieged Paris, where the Catholic faction was still in power. On August 1, 1589, Henry III was fatally stabbed by a fanatical monk named Jacques Clement. Henry III died the next day from his injuries.

After Henry III's death, Henry of Navarre had himself proclaimed as King Henry IV of France. For Philip II of Spain this was reason enough to enter the struggle in France on the side of the Catholic faction. His plan was to put his daughter, Isabella of Spain, on the French throne in order to secure the survival and supremacy of Catholicism in France. Amongst other actions, Philip sent his general Alexander Farnese, duke of Parma, to France. Parma, who had been very successful in leading the Army of Flanders against the Dutch Republic, managed to end the siege of Paris. Farnese achieved some military successes but died in 1592. Henry IV eventually achieved victory in 1593, partially by converting to the Catholic faith (reportedly saying "Paris vaut bien une messe", 'Paris is well worth a Mass') and then on February 27, 1593, was finally crowned King of France.

The Spanish troops remained active in France, however, with the goal of putting Philip's daughter on the French throne. Henry was thus forced to enter the war against Philip II, even though he considered negotiating peace with Spain several times.

=== The Republic of the Seven United Netherlands ===
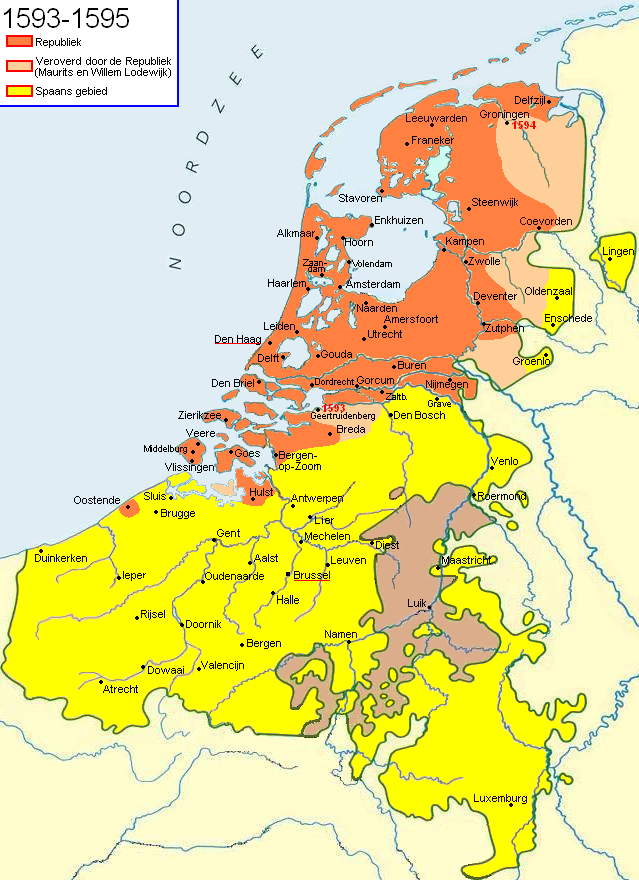
A map of the Netherlands showing the progress of the war against Spain from 1593 to 1595.

The Eighty Years' War had been raging in and around the Republic of the Seven United Netherlands since the 1568, though in that time it was still called a revolt. Since the beginning of the revolt, religious freedom had been, after the tax (the so-called tenth penny of Alba, an early form of VAT), one of the main reasons used to justify the rebellion against the King of Spain, Philip II. The Reformation had taken hold in large parts of the Low Countries. Since 1568 both parties had had their share of victories and defeats. From 1589 Maurice of Orange was, as commander of the Dutch army, the main military leader of the Republic. He was supported by his cousin William Louis of Nassau-Dillenburg, who was stadtholder of Friesland. Maurice and William Louis carried out their military operations in close collaboration with the States-General of the Netherlands, which provided the funds for the army.

Already in 1585, England aided the Republic by sending 6000 soldiers under the command of Robert Dudley, 1st Earl of Leicester. In return, England was given the towns of Brill and Flushing on lease. The presence of the Earl of Leicester was not a success and the Republic perceived him mainly as a burden, since England had to be paid for the English forces that had been sent. The Earl had been assigned by Elizabeth I to push for peace between the Republic and Spain, which ultimately resulted in the Earl's forced departure from the Republic in 1587. In the subsequent decades, Maurice of Orange and William Louis of Nassau-Dillenburg obtained a number of victories over the Spanish, expanding the territory over which the States-General had control considerably. The conquered territory included amongst others, Twente, the county of Zutphen, the Oversticht, Groningen and the Ommelanden.

=== Spain ===
During the 16th century Spain was a powerful nation, led by King Philip II. Seeing himself as the most powerful monarch in Europe, and a staunch catholic, Philip saw it as his job to lead the Counter Reformation against the emerging Protestantism. Because his territorial domains also included Portugal, Sicily, Sardinia and Naples, he was able to exert a powerful influence over much of Europe. He was also Lord of the Netherlands, where, since the Beggars Revolt in 1572, Protestants had taken control of a number of cities, which meant that he now had to face Protestants inside of his own territories.

Spain had the open support of the various popes in the 16th century, including Pope Clement VIII, who was pope from 1592 to 1605. Other states who openly stood on the side of Spain were Savoy and Lorraine.

== Alliance ==
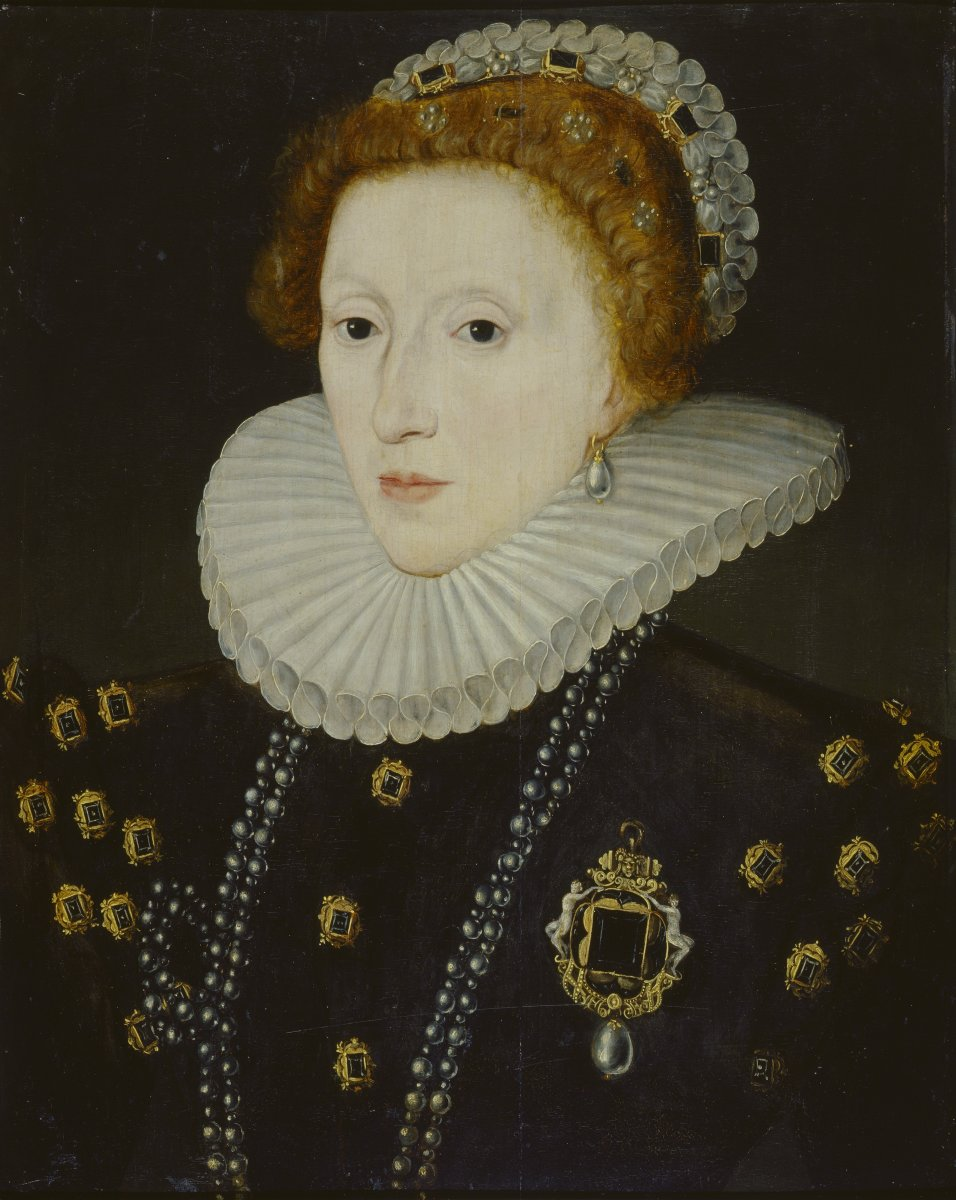
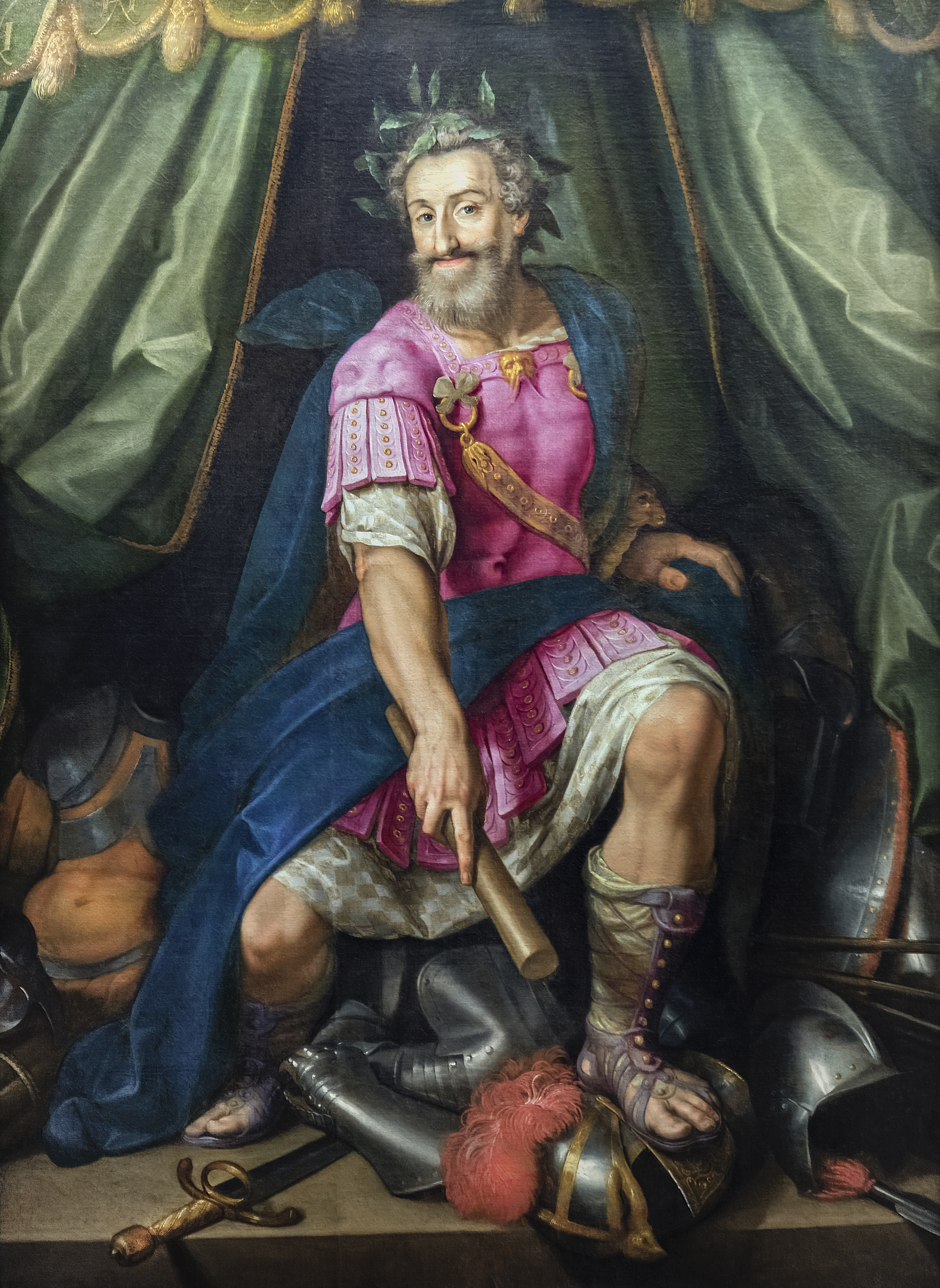
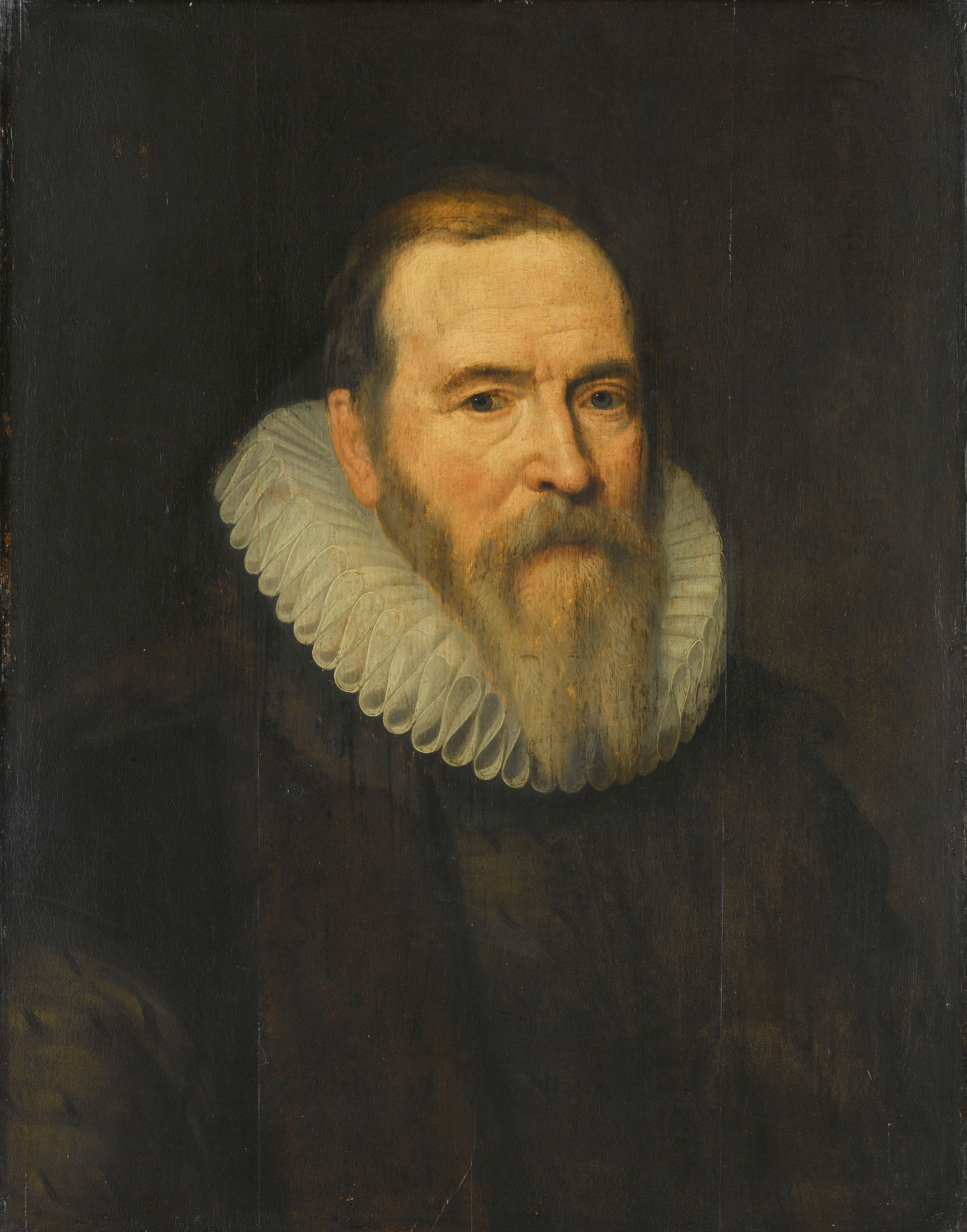
From top to bottom: Elizabeth I of England, Henry IV of France and Johan van Oldenbarnevelt

France and the Republic made efforts to form an alliance. The problem was that an alliance between these two countries, without the addition of other states, was not powerful enough and would earn little respect. A third party was needed and England fit the profile perfectly. If England joined the alliance, several German princes could also be tempted to join. Henry IV was reluctant to ask Elizabeth to participate in an alliance because it could be seen as a cry for help. The Republic took the opposite view, that Elizabeth should be invited immediately, because otherwise the possibility of English support would be very small. Delaying the invitation could be interpreted by England as passing over a potential ally.

The Republic also tried to involve other, notably German, states in the alliance. Reasons for this were that the support of England was thought to be insecure, which created the possibility of the domination of the alliance by France. In addition, the German states had many troops at their disposal. The German princes were mainly focused on their own territories because of the struggle between Lutherans and Calvinists. Negotiations were started with the Electorates the Palatinate and the Brandenburg, but the Holy Roman Emperor blocked the way to an agreement. The Emperor was opposed to the participation of the German electorates in treaties with foreign powers, which could drag the German principalities into a civil war.

Around 1595, Elizabeth I of England was not very interested in forming an alliance with the Republic and France. She was very apprehensive about the possibility that the Republic could become a major naval power and competitor to England, and she saw France as an eternal enemy. While she was not looking for the demise of the kingdom, she was also not prepared to help France become a world power.

In 1596 the attitude of Elizabeth I changed. This had everything to do with the conquest of Calais by Albert of Austria on behalf of Spain. Calais had been an English possession for approximately two centuries, until France conquered the city in 1558. Elizabeth wanted it back, but failing that, she preferred the city under French control against that of Spain. Albert of Austria had besieged the city in April 1596. Its conquest gave Spain a port close to England that could easily be expanded to a naval base. In London, the fall of Calais caused a riot. Henry IV deliberated on accepting a peace offer from Spain, but decided to leave the choice to Elizabeth. He let Elizabeth know that she could help him in the struggle against Spain, but if she did not, he would accept the Spanish peace offer. If France were to make peace with Spain, Spain would be able to concentrate more troops and resources to the struggle against England. Pope Clement VIII, amongst others, was a proponent of this scenario.

Elizabeth eventually decided to negotiate an alliance with France. The Republic was kept out of these negotiations, which lasted one month. Two treaties were signed. One treaty was made public, while the other, official treaty was kept secret. The public treaty stated that England and France would not unilaterally conclude peace with Spain. In order to support France in its war against Spain, England was to send 4,000 soldiers to France. The costs of these soldiers was paid up front by England, but would be repaid by France at a later date. Four French noblemen were sent to London to act as guarantee. The secret treaty, however, stated that England would send only 2,000 soldiers to France, and these soldiers would be stationed solely in Picardy, an area which England had an interest in. The difference in numbers between the two treaties was intended to encourage other states that would join the alliance to make similar efforts to those of England, even though England actually offered a smaller contribution.

The Republic was the first state approached to join the alliance. France sent the Duke of Bouillon to the Hague to make the offer. Other states such as Denmark, Scotland, various German and Italian states were subsequently contacted, but none were given as much attention as the Dutch Republic. The Republic was prepared to support other opponents of Spain, so as to gain independence from Spain and also to resist Spanish domination throughout the world. Therefore, the Republic joined the alliance against Spain on October 31, 1596. The Republic attempted to add a clause to the treaty which stated that England or France could not conclude peace with Spain without the consent of the Republic, but this arrangement was not accepted by other states.

Then the German Electorates were again approached to join the alliance, first by France in the spring of 1597, followed by the Republic in August of the same year. Maurice of Orange captured Rheinberg from the Spanish as a favour to the German princes, but they decided not to join the alliance. The Holy Roman Emperor Rudolf II had been making attempts to negotiate a peace between the warring states since 1590, but the emperor was linked too closely to Spain in the eyes of the members of the alliance for them to approach him.

=== Results ===
Elizabeth tried to renege on the agreements as much as possible. She wanted, for example, to only support France in a defensive war against Spain, contrary to the Republic, which had been on the offensive for a number of years. She was nonetheless the first who made use of the alliance. England's main fleet had been sent to the West Indies, while a new Spanish Armada was being built for an invasion of England. In 1588 Spain's first Armada had been narrowly defeated. By conquering Calais, Spain had gained a port that could serve as a springboard for a new invasion of England. Because of this, Elizabeth asked for support from the Republic to build a fleet that could stop the new Armada. Johan van Oldenbarnevelt honored the request and immediately took a number of measures. Johan Duvenvoorde, Fleet Admiral of the Dutch Republic, was sent to England to advise on the construction of the English fleet, and patrols in the English Channel and North Sea were tightened. In addition, it was forbidden to sell grain to Spain, so that the impact of crop failures in Spain became even greater.

In 1596 a combined Anglo-Dutch fleet was able to defeat the Spanish fleet and sack Cádiz. The following year, however, the Anglo-Dutch fleet lost a battle against the Spanish fleet.

As late as 1596 the Republic received advantages from the alliance. A request to England for sending troops was granted. Francis Vere was sent with 2,200 soldiers to the Republic. France also sent troops to the Republic, but these could be recalled at any time if deemed necessary by Henry IV. This actually happened in 1597, when Albert of Austria made an attempt to relieve the Siege of Amiens, and Henry IV required more troops to continue the siege. As a result, Elizabeth also sent 4,200 soldiers to assist Henry against the Spanish there. Because of Albert's concentration on France, the Spanish forces guarding the border with the Dutch republic were left on their own, enabling Maurice of Orange to capture several cities in his celebrated campaign of 1597.

France also received troops sent by England and the Republic, so in the end all three states participating in the alliance benefited from it. The Republic sent, as agreed in the treaty, 4,000 troops to France, while England, according to the secret treaty, sent much fewer troops.

Aside from the military commitments, the alliance had another important meaning for the Republic. By the signing of the alliance, France and England became the first states to officially recognise the Dutch Republic as a sovereign state.

== End ==
The alliance between the three states was in effect for only a few years. France signed a peace treaty with Spain in 1598, making its participation in the alliance meaningless. France had already started working on a peace treaty with Spain right after signing the alliance, without the Republic and England being aware of this. However, Henry IV did ask the Spanish ambassador if a comprehensive peace between all warring parties was possible, but the Spanish envoy considered it unlikely that Philip II was willing to make peace with rebels who refused to allow the public practice of the Catholic faith. England was also negotiating for a peace with Spain in those years, but it took until 1604 before peace was made with Spain with the Treaty of London. This treaty also required England to take no further part in the war between Spain and the Republic. Finally, Spain also tried to arrange for a peace or a ceasefire with the Dutch Republic, especially after the Battle of Nieuwpoort in 1600, but it would take until 1609 for both states to agree to the Twelve Years' Truce.

== Sources ==
- Robert Jacobus Fruin (1861): Tien jaren uit den tachtigjarigen oorlog, 1588-1598
- Jacob Hendrik Hora Siccama (1867): Schets van de diplomatieke betrekkingen tusschen Nederland en Brandenburg, 1596-1678. Kemink en zoon
- Jan van Hout (1998): Leids heelal: het Loterijspel (1596) Publisher lost
