= Quintuple Alliance =

1818 alliance of European nations

- European countries that were part of the Quintuple Alliance in 1815.
- Signed: Autumn 1818
- Location: Aix-la-Chapelle
- Parties: Austria; France; Prussia; Russia; United Kingdom

The Quintuple Alliance came into being at the Congress of Aix-la-Chapelle in 1818, when France joined the Quadruple Alliance created by Austria, Prussia, the Russian Empire, and the United Kingdom of Great Britain and Ireland. The European peace settlement concluded at the Congress of Vienna in 1815.

== History ==
After following the Congress of Aix-la-Chapelle (in Aachen), the Alliance powers met thrice: in 1820 at the Congress of Troppau (Opava), in 1821 at the Congress of Laibach (Ljubljana), and in 1822 at the Congress of Verona.

While Britain stood largely aloof from the Alliance's illiberal actions, the four continental monarchies were successful in authorising Austrian military action in Italy in 1821 and French intervention in Spain in 1823.

The Alliance is conventionally taken to have become defunct along with the Holy Alliance of the three original continental members following the death of Emperor Alexander I of Russia in 1825. Despite the Alliance's dissolution, the Great Powers of France, Britain, and Russia would go on to intervene in the Battle of Navarino.

== See also ==
- Concert of Europe
- Holy Alliance
- Quadruple Alliance (1815)
