= Juan de Mancicidor =

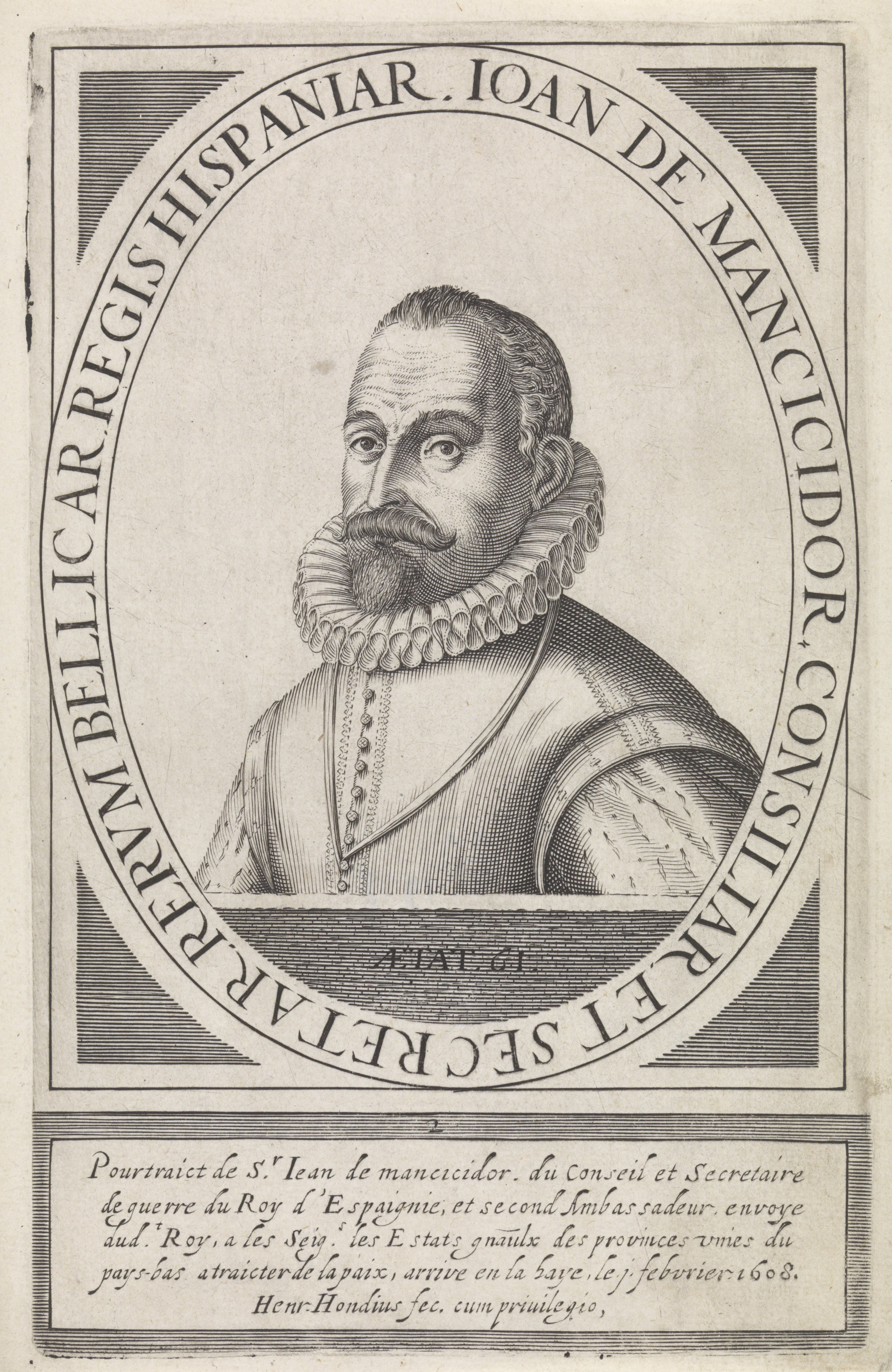
- Hendrik Hondius I, engraved portrait of Juan de Mancicidor, from Belgiae Pacificatorum Vera Delineatio (1608)

Secretary of State and War
- In office 1596–1618

Personal details
- Died: before 30 May 1618
- Spouse(s): (1) Eugénie de Vogeleer (2) Marie de Mol

Juan de Mancicidor (died before 30 May 1618) was secretary of state and war to the Archduke Albert from 1596 to his death in 1618.

Mancicidor served in Madrid under Philip II's secretary of state, Juan de Idiáquez. When Archduke Albert was sent to the Low Countries as Governor General in 1596, Mancicidor accompanied him as his secretary of state and war. As Secretary of State he was responsible for the confidential correspondence between the Archduke and King Philip III of Spain, royal ministers, Spanish ambassadors at their various postings, the governor of Milan, the Viceroy of Naples, and other dignitaries. As Secretary of War, he countersigned all the Archduke's military orders. He was part of the delegation that negotiated the Twelve Years' Truce of 1609–1621.

Mancicidor was married twice. His first wife was Eugénie de Vogeleer and his second was Marie de Mol. Both were Flemish. Three daughters of the first marriage were christened in Brussels in 1598, 1599, and 1602, and two of the second marriage in 1616 and 1618. He is known to have had two sons.

He died before 30 May 1618, when the christening of his youngest child took place, but the exact date is unknown.
