= Holy Alliance =

Military alliance between Austria, Prussia, and Russia

The Holy Alliance in 1840 Austrian Empire Kingdom of Prussia Russian Empire

The Holy Alliance (German: Heilige Allianz; Russian: Священный союз, romanized: Svyashchennyy soyuz), also called the Grand Alliance, was a coalition linking the absolute monarchist great powers of Austria, Prussia, and Russia, which was created after the final defeat of Napoleon at the behest of Emperor Alexander I of Russia and signed in Paris on 26 September 1815.

The conservative alliance aimed to restrain secular liberalism in Europe in the wake of the devastating French Revolutionary Wars and the Napoleonic Wars; it nominally succeeded in this until the Crimean War. Chancellor Otto von Bismarck managed to reunite the Holy Alliance, as League of the Three Emperors, following the unification of Germany in 1871. The alliance faltered by the 1880s due to Austrian and Russian conflicts of interest over the decline of the Ottoman Empire.

== Establishment ==
The alliance was formed to instil the divine right of kings and Christian values in European political life, as pursued by Alexander I under the influence of his spiritual adviser Baroness Barbara von Krüdener. It was written by Emperor Alexander I of Russia and edited by Ioannis Kapodistrias and Alexandru Sturdza. Under the treaty European rulers would agree to govern as "branches" of the Christian community and offer mutual service. In the first draft, Emperor Alexander I made appeals to mysticism through a proposed unified Christian empire that was seen as disconcerting by the other monarchies. Following revision, a more pragmatic version of the alliance was adopted by Russia, Prussia, and Austria. The document was called "an apocalypse of diplomacy" by French diplomat Dominique-Georges-Frédéric Dufour de Pradt.

The agreement was at first secret, and mistrusted by liberals, though liberalism was effectively restrained in this political culture until the Revolutions of 1848. About three months after the Final Act of the Congress of Vienna, the monarchs of Catholic (Austria), Protestant (Prussia), and Orthodox (Russia) confession promised to act on the basis of "justice, love, and peace", both in internal and foreign affairs, for "consolidating human institutions and remedying their imperfections".

The Alliance was quickly rejected by the United Kingdom (though George IV declared consent in his capacity as King of Hanover), the Papal States, and the Ottoman Empire. Lord Castlereagh, the British Foreign Secretary, called it "a piece of sublime mysticism and nonsense". Nonetheless, Britain participated in the Concert of Europe. In the late 1820s, Charles X of France sought to strengthen and protect his conservative monarchy through an alliance with Russia, leveraging their shared monarchist interests and anti-revolutionary activity.

== Organisation ==
In practice, the Austrian state chancellor and foreign minister, Prince Klemens von Metternich made it a bastion against democracy and citizen-nationalism. It also allowed coordinating suppression of Polish efforts to restore an independent state, by Austria in the Kingdom of Galicia and Lodomeria, by Russia in its Congress Poland and by Prussia in the Grand Duchy of Posen and in West Prussia.

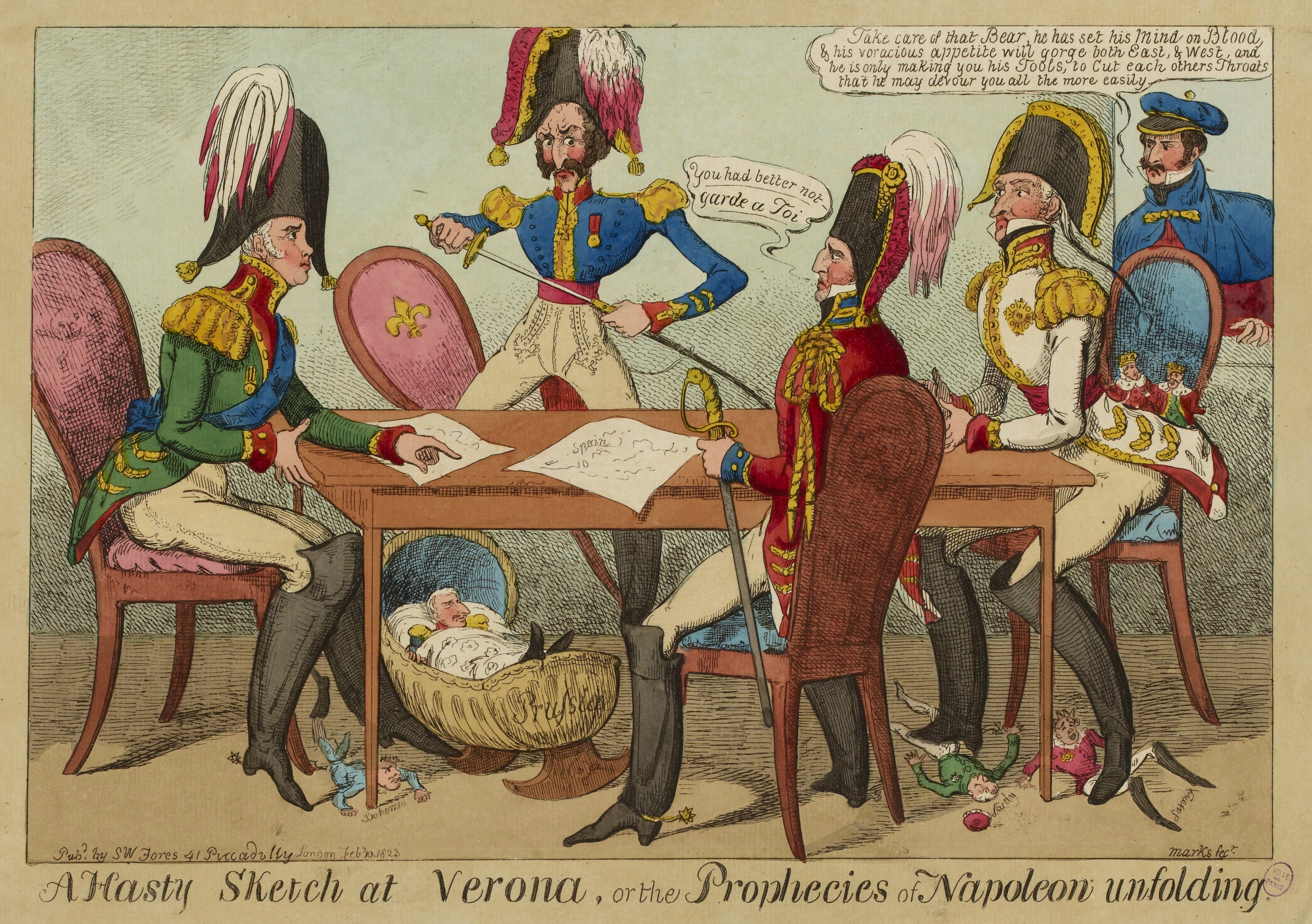
An 1822 caricature of the Congress of Verona

The Alliance is usually associated with the later Quadruple and Quintuple Alliances, which included the United Kingdom and from 1818 France, with the aim of upholding the European peace settlement and balance of power in the Concert of Europe, concluded at the Congress of Vienna. On 29 September 1818, Alexander, Emperor Francis I of Austria and King Frederick William III of Prussia met with the Duke of Wellington, Viscount Castlereagh and the Duc de Richelieu at the Congress of Aix-la-Chapelle to demand stern measures against university "demagogues", which was realised in the Carlsbad Decrees of 1819.

In 1820, at the Congress of Troppau and the succeeding Congress of Laibach in 1821, Metternich tried to align his allies in the suppression of the Carbonari revolt against King Ferdinand I of the Two Sicilies. In 1822, the Quintuple Alliance met for the last time at the Congress of Verona to advise against the Greek Revolution and to resolve upon the French invasion of Spain.

The Münchengrätz Convention was an agreement concluded on September 19, 1833, between the Russian Empire (represented by Tsar Nicholas I and Count Nesselrode), the Austrian Empire (represented by Emperor Francis II and Metternich) and the Kingdom of Prussia (represented by King Frederick William III and Friedrich Ancillon). The convention was the result of talks held at a conference that lasted from September 10 to 20, 1833, to maintain political stability and suppress revolutionary challenges during a period of ideological tension in Europe. It reinforced the conservative alliance strategies central to Metternich's foreign policy framework.

The last meetings had revealed the rising antagonism between Britain and France, especially on Italian unification, the right to self-determination, and the Eastern Question. The Alliance is conventionally taken to have become defunct with Alexander's death in 1825. France ultimately went her separate way following the July Revolution of 1830, leaving the core of Austria, Prussia, and Russia as a Central-Eastern European block which once again congregated to suppress the Revolutions of 1848.

The Austro-Russian alliance broke up in the Crimean War. Though Russia had helped to suppress the Hungarian Revolution of 1848, Austria did not take any action to support her ally, declared herself neutral, and even occupied the Danubian Principalities upon the Russian retreat in 1854. Thereafter, Austria remained isolated, which added to the loss of her leading role in the German states, culminating in her defeat during the Austro-Prussian War in 1866.

== See also ==
- Biedermeier
- Second League of Armed Neutrality
- 1834 Quadruple Alliance
- Unholy alliance (geopolitical)
- Vormärz
