= Quadruple Alliance (1815) =

1815 alliance between Austria, Prussia, Russia, and the UK

- European countries that were part of the Quadruple Alliance in 1815.
- Signed: 20 November 1815
- Location: Paris, France
- Parties: Austria; Prussia; Russia; United Kingdom

The Quadruple Alliance (Russian: Четверной союз, romanized: Chetvernoy soyuz, German: Vierfache Allianz) was formed by the monarchist Great Powers of Austria, Prussia, Russia, and Great Britain to counter the military and revolutionary republican political threats posed by the expansion of the First French Empire under Napoleon I and to fight the War of the Seventh Coalition.

== History ==
In the wake of the final defeat of Napoleon at the Battle of Waterloo on 18 June 1815, the alliance was formalised with the signing of the Treaty of Paris on 20 November 1815. It renewed the use of the Congress System which sought to stabilise European international relations at the time and pledged each signatory to a military alliance that ultimately aimed to crush any recurrence of revolutionary outbreaks like those that led to the French Revolution if they occurred anywhere in Europe. The quadruple alliance lasted until 1818, by which time the restoration of the Bourbon monarchy enabled France – now a constitutional monarchy ruled by King Louis XVIII – to join the Quadruple Alliance, turning it into the Quintuple Alliance.

== See also ==
- Treaty of Paris (1815)
- Concert of Europe
- Holy Alliance
- Quintuple Alliance
- Second Egyptian-Turkish War
