= Brittany campaign (1590–1598) =

1590-1598 occupation of Brittany by Spain

- Part of French Wars of Religion and Anglo-Spanish War (1585–1604)
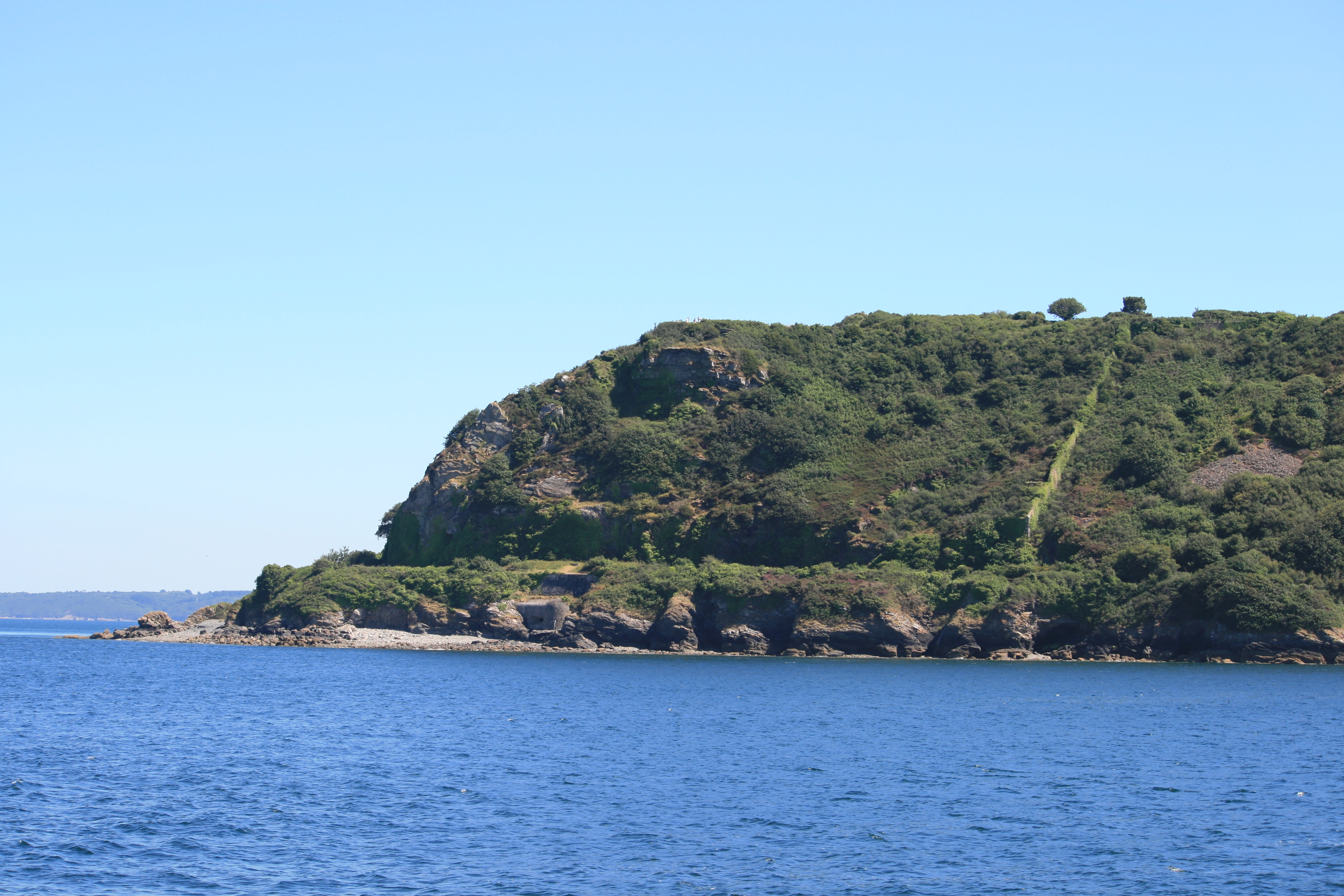
- Pointe des Espagnols
Date	1590–1598
Location	Brittany, Kingdom of France
Result	Peace of Vervins

Belligerents
Spain; Catholic League	France; England

Commanders and leaders
(Spanish Empire) Juan del Águila (Spain) Tomé de Paredes †; Duke of Mercœur; Marquis de Sablé	(Kingdom of France) Duke of Montpensier (Kingdom of France) Prince of Conti; Jean VI d'Aumont (Kingdom of England) John Norreys (Kingdom of England) Martin Frobisher † (Kingdom of England) Anthony Wingfield

The Brittany campaign, or the campaign of Brittany, was a military occupation of Brittany, France, by Spain. It began in summer 1590 when Philippe-Emmanuel de Lorraine, Duke of Mercœur, the governor of Brittany, offered the port of Blavet to King Philip II of Spain so that he could harbour his fleet. The occupation formally ended on May 2, 1598, with the Peace of Vervins.

The Spanish used it as a base of operations to protect the treasure fleets, frustrate English naval operations, make incursions along the English coast and aid the Catholic League, all with the ultimate goal being the invasion of England.

== Background ==
On September 22, 1588, the surviving ships of the Grand Armada began to enter various Spanish ports with their battered ships, exhausted crews and a considerable number of sick men on board.

There is no doubt that the failure of the enterprise of England represented a serious setback to Philip II's strategic thinking, although its repercussions were felt much more on a psychological level than a material one, since Casado Soto had accurately documented that of the 123 ships that sailed from La Coruña, "only" 31 were lost, of which only 3 were galleons, the rest being the urcas and other smaller vessels.

On the other hand, the invasion project was not abandoned and during the last years of the reign of Philip II there were several attempts to carry it out, within the increasingly generalized confrontation to which the two monarchies were forced in different maritime and ground based scenarios, among which the Brittany campaign stands out.

=== Armada after the return of the expedition ===
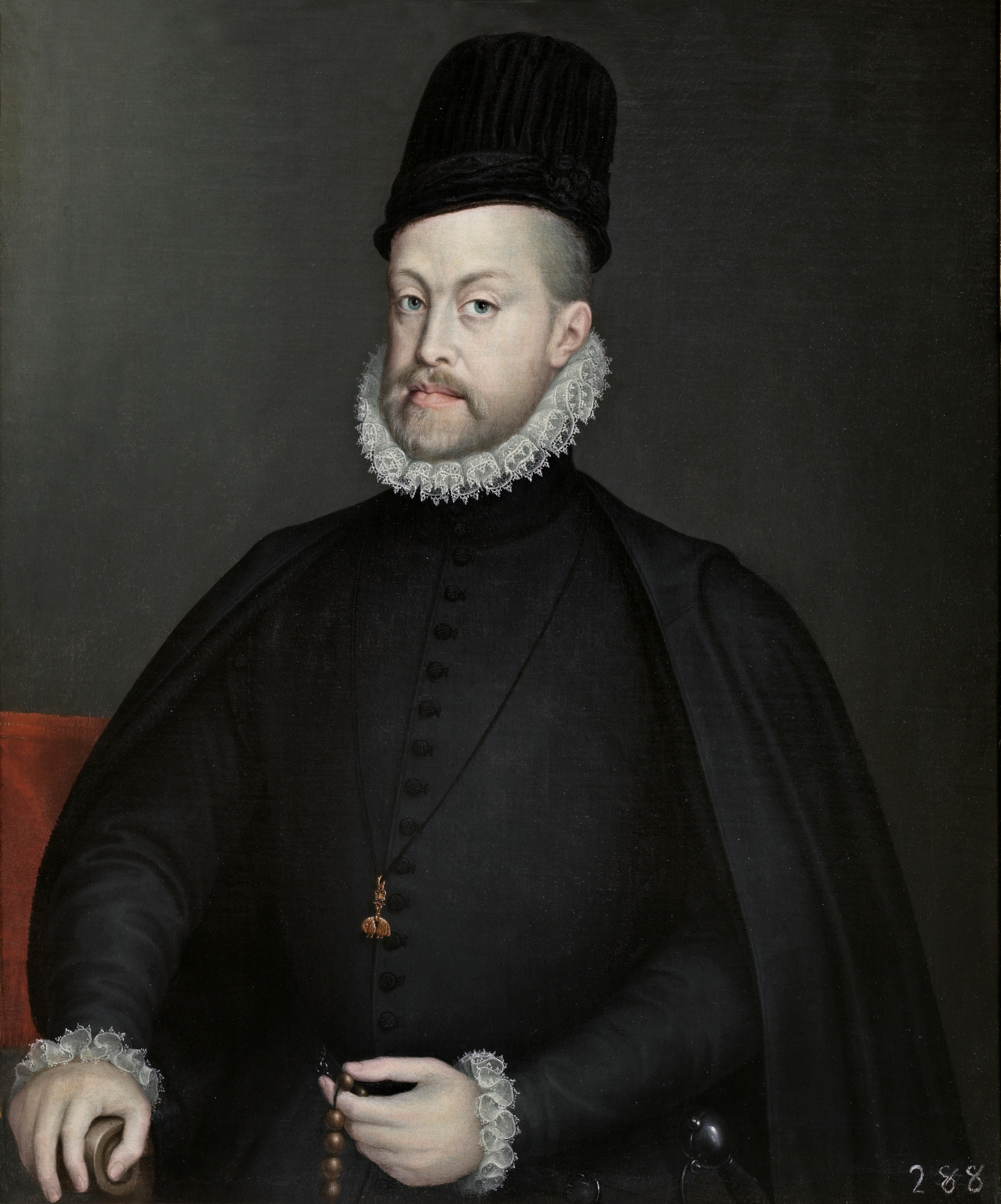
Philip II of Spain

The need to guarantee the safety of Spain's coasts while facing the very real fear of a potential English attack determined the adoption of a series of measures aimed at recovering the combat capacity of Spain's Navy, while at the same time replacing the human losses.

On the one hand, most of the ships that survived the expedition were concentrated in Santander, where the necessary repairs were carried out using all available resources. Only the galleons "San Bernardo" and "San Juan" from the Portuguese squadron, the "San Bartolomé" from Don Pedro de Valdés' squadron, together with the galleys "Diana" and "Princesa" and some smaller boats remained in La Coruña.

In November, 1588, Philip II ordered the construction of 21 new galleons, all of them large. 12 of them were built in Cantabrian ports and stood out due to their number and the names they received; they were known as "The twelve apostles". In addition, 6 were made in Portugal, 2 in Gibraltar and 1 in Vinaroz; all of them entered service in a very short space of time.

On the other hand, shortly after the return of the Armada, a general mobilization of troops had been ordered in all the coastal provinces with which to face the expected response from the English, although the arrival of winter temporarily distanced the fear of an immediate counterattack thus restoring confidence.

The resultant decrease in tension allowed the infantry units that returned with the Armada to be sent to winter in the interior, thus alleviating Santander of the burden of billeting the large number of attack forces that were concentrated there.

During the first months of 1589, all these units were restructured, grouping them into two tercios that remained under the command of Don Agustín de Mexía and Don Francisco de Toledo. They were joined by the tercio of Don Juan del Águila which had not taken part in the enterprise of England but which was attached to the Armada.

=== English attack on La Coruña and Lisbon ===
The situation described continued to be the same when the Spanish coasts were surprised by England's response, eager to take advantage of circumstances that they considered very favorable.

With the arrival of spring, 180 ships with 27,667 men sailed from Plymouth under the command of Sir Francis Drake and Sir John Norris with the objectives of destroying the remnants of the Spanish Armada ships in Santander, then seizing Lisbon and the Azores in the name of Don António, Prior of Crato who kept alive his hopes of accessing the Portuguese throne.

As this formidable fleet approached the Galician coast, it received notice that the Armada was anchored in La Coruña, whereupon Drake decided to revise the initial plans and attack that port to surprise and destroy the Armada ships that he assumed were gathered there.

The information was false because the Armada stayed in Santander, completely oblivious to what was coming, while in the port of A Coruña only the aforementioned ships were found. Drake soon realized his mistake but, for reasons that have never been sufficiently explained, decided to continue the attack and after overcoming the initial weak resistance, managed to land the bulk of his forces on the beach of Santa Lucía on May 4.

Map of the English Armada campaigns.

The Viceroy of Galicia, Juan Pacheco de Toledo, 2nd Marquis of Cerralbo, could only oppose them with 1,500 hastily mobilized soldiers in and around the city. Despite which, all of Drake's attempts to seize La Coruña failed in the face of the tenacious resistance offered by these forces and the population itself, so on May 18 he was forced to re-embark his troops, leaving the port the following day. Their losses were estimated at between 1,000 and 1,500 men, while on the Spanish side, three galleons were set on fire by their own crews to prevent them from falling into enemy hands, although the galleys that fled to the Betanzos estuary were saved.

From Galicia, the English ships went along the Portuguese coast during the first days of June where they attempted to capture Lisbon. After intense fighting, they failed and ultimately retreated. These bloody actions represented a serious setback for Drake who had to return to England after losing half of his troops, some 10,000 men between dead and wounded, to which the loss of nine ships had to be added, seven of them off Lisbon, all without being able to obtain any immediate benefit. In the end, the expedition was an abject failure with only 102 ships and 3,722 men returning to claim their pay.

== Change of strategy ==
The English attack on La Coruña caused a great commotion by revealing, once again, the enemy's ability to operate on the peninsular coasts and although the action had failed, the reality of a landing of English infantry on Spanish soil and the evidence that several cities had felt seriously threatened during the days of the siege could not be denied.

It was therefore necessary to decide what urgent measures to take so as to deal with the possibility of new English attacks on the Spanish coasts while adequately protecting the arrival of the fleets from the Indies.

The decision was made to transfer the entire navy to the port of Ferrol, which, due to its geographical location, was best suited for carrying out these missions. Ferrol and Lisbon would be, from then on, the bases from which naval operations would be carried out which, due to its numbers and characteristics, was of great importance, as evidenced by the fact that at the beginning of 1590, the following ships were anchored in Ferrol:

Galleons of Portugal	4
Galleons of Castile	11
Galeasses	2
Ships of His Majesty	2
Private vessels	8
Pataches	8
Zabras	10
Faluas	2

The impact caused by the English actions was so great that Philip II's Court even considered projects as chimerical as the one presented by the pilot Juan de Escalante to set English ships ablaze in their own ports.

This method of attack by means of fire ships had manifested itself in all its effectiveness during the 1584-1585 siege of Antwerp by Alexander Farnese and on the night of August 7, 1588, when used by the English against the Grand Armada anchored in Dunkirk.

The memory of these events and Escalante's prestige provided him with the necessary means to carry out his plan. To this end, "three Benaquero ships" called "Santa María", "San Julián" and "San Pedro" were seized, valued at 500, 450 and 350 ducats and owned by Juan Pérez de Larreta, Sebastián del Aya and Miguel de Cordillos, respectively.

The three ships left, in mid-August, accompanied by a flyboat in which Juan de Escalante was travelling, ready to carry out his feat. But...

when they were about to enter the channel, on August twenty-seventh, they encountered some English naval ships, which began to follow them so intently that they provoked Escalante to order the crews of his other ships to go over to his flyboat and to scuttle them, which they did, without saving anything else...

— Archivo General de Simancas (AGS). Guerra antigua. Leg. 299, № 159.

The sad end of this episode is known from the numerous claims that the owners of the requisitioned vessels and their relatives filed in court to try to obtain financial compensation for the loss of what constituted their only means of livelihood.

The hope of finishing off the enemy Armada through a successful coup de main was also present in the minds of the English. Statements obtained from a prisoner of the enterprise of England, the hospital official Francisco de Ledesma, reveal that, during his captivity, he was able to learn that twelve Englishmen had embarked on a French urca anchored in the port of "Artamua", "who know how to speak French and Spanish and other languages, and among them an engineer ... who brought orders to set fire to the Armada wherever it was moored, after it was refurbished."

But aside from these utopian projects, the fact is that during these first months, the Spanish strategy had an eminently defensive character, since its fundamental objective was to protect the arrival of the fleets from the Indies, and as would later happen in Brittany, the need for new types of ships capable of adapting to the needs of this type of confrontation began to be considered.

In this sense, the opinion of Don Juan Maldonado is very illustrative, who, in October 1589, already explained to the King the

need that there is in this Navy for some vessels that, being long-range sailboats, are capable of carrying artillery and some men to spot and attack the corsair ships that they find, for having seen some that they have sailed in in recent days, they cannot be pursued with the big ships, nor are the pataches suitable, for they are small, thus the need for medium vessels of 150 to 200 tons; their draught is of great consideration, since being light is what is intended.

— Archivo General de Simancas (AGS). Guerra antigua. Leg. 252, № 90.

== Operations in Brittany ==
These defensive plans were still in force when, after the winter of 1589–1590, Philip II addressed the Council of War requesting their opinion on what could be done during that year with the Navy concentrated in Ferrol. By the summer of 1590, some 100 vessels were ready for service.

At its meeting on May 18, 1590, the council's response could not have been more expressive, since it considered that "time being so far advanced and how few soldiers and mariners they have to be able to undertake any important enterprise", a most intriguing one would be for

15 or 20 large ships to be chosen and adding to those another 12 or 15 flyboats, putting in them elite soldiers who could be chosen from the Tercios that are dedicated to them... patrol the coasts of these kingdoms and purge and secure these seas of corsairs and await and escort the fleets from the Indies and that the other ships may be discharged and the remaining infantry go into garrisons and in this way Your Majesty will save a lot of costs and be able to entertain yourself and wait for a better time and situation to carry out the main enterprise.

— Archivo General de Simancas (AGS). Guerra antigua. Leg. 299, № 58.

This position by those who considered that the "main business" continued to be the invasion of England, had been adopted with the conviction that they did not have all the necessary elements to issue a well-founded opinion, and they declared as much to the King, indicating that "in order to realize what Your Majesty commands, being a business of such consideration, it was necessary for the Council to be more prudent and informed of the things that are being discussed"

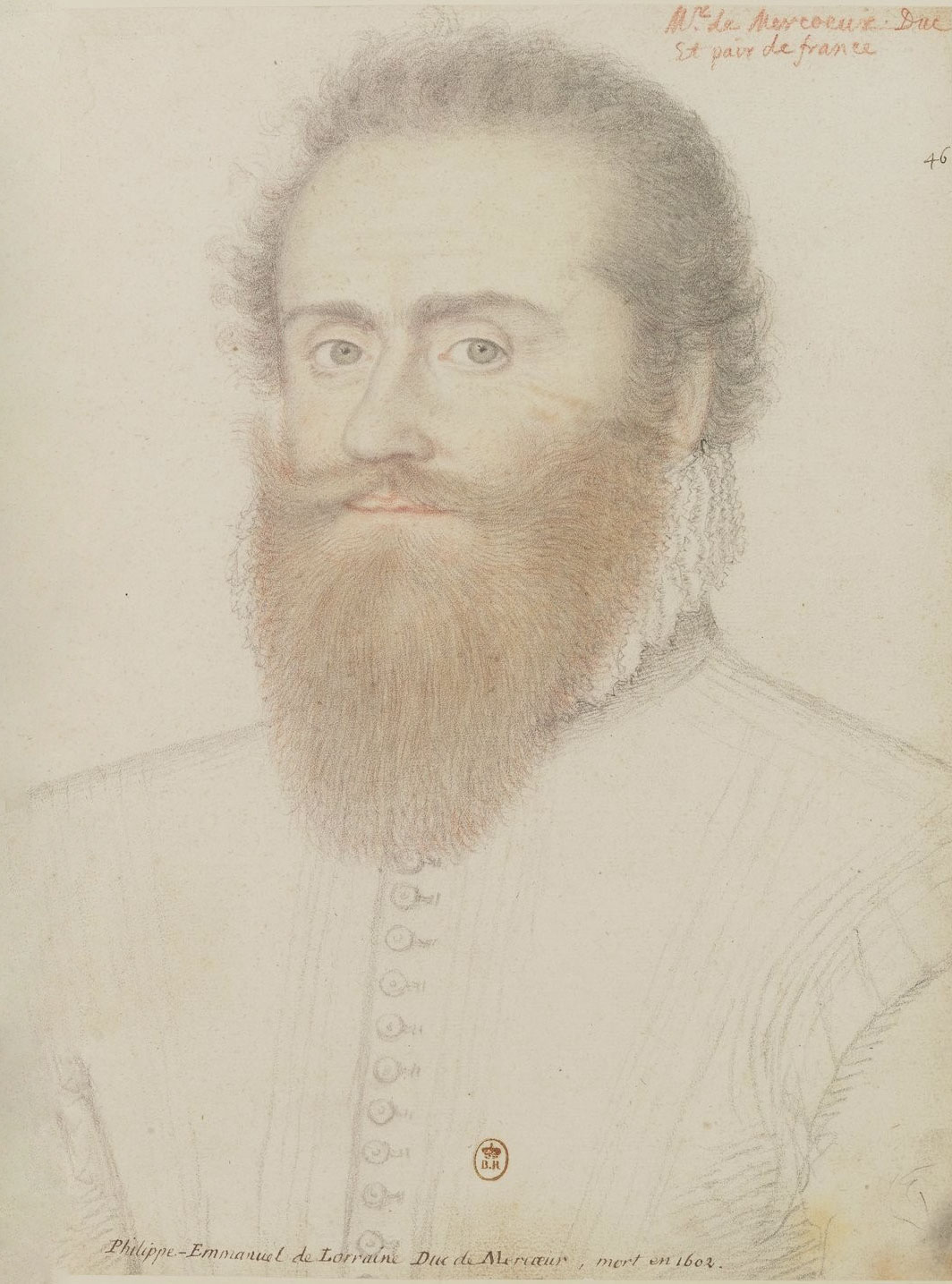
Philippe Emmanuel, Duke of Mercoeur

A few weeks later, on July 6, 1590, the War Council learned of a letter that Diego Maldonado had sent from Nantes in which he relayed an offer from Philippe-Emmanuel de Lorraine, Duke of Mercœur of the "port of Blavet (today called Port-Louis, Morbihan), wherein to assemble his Navy, and everything in Brittany that is in his charge and government", expressing the hope with which he awaited "the help and protection of Your Majesty to free him from the violence and power of the heretics".

The council, which had been so reticent before to undertake important actions, now expressed its enthusiasm giving "thanks to Our Lord who has been served to open to Your Majesty those doors of Blavet to execute his holy and royal wishes and do him a very great service, preserving that province in the Catholic faith", without forgetting, however, that that port was "the most comfortable and important that one could wish for, from there, to set foot in England and preserve it in spite of the whole world, for the ease with which one could help whenever one wanted, due to the abundance of provisions and other comforts that would be had from Brittany".

The next day, the King, in view of what was reported by his Council, ordered the sending of this aid "as soon as possible", but "so as not to go around culling people from the Tercios", it seemed better to him that "an entire infantry tercio from the Armada go and that it be Don Juan del Águila's".

This decision had probably already been made some weeks ago, even before Diego Maldonado's letter arrived, because curiously on June 1, the King himself had ordered Don Juan del Águila to go urgently to Ferrol where he arrived on the 4th of that same month, although the order to prevent the Tercio from embarking was not sent to him until July 10.

== Objectives of supporting the Catholic League ==
The French succession issue had become one of the fundamental objectives of Philip II's foreign policy for whom the possibility of a Calvinist accessing the throne of the neighboring country was an impossible risk to assume.

Already in 1584 he had signed the Treaty of Joinville with Henry I, Duke of Guise, through which he undertook to lend determined support to the Catholics, whose interests they represented. But at the end of 1588, and protected by the crisis that the failure of the Grand Armada had caused, Henry III of France ordered the assassination of the Duke of Guise and his brother, unleashing a true public uprising known as the Day of the Barricades whose most notable effect, on the part of the League, was to gain control of the city of Paris.

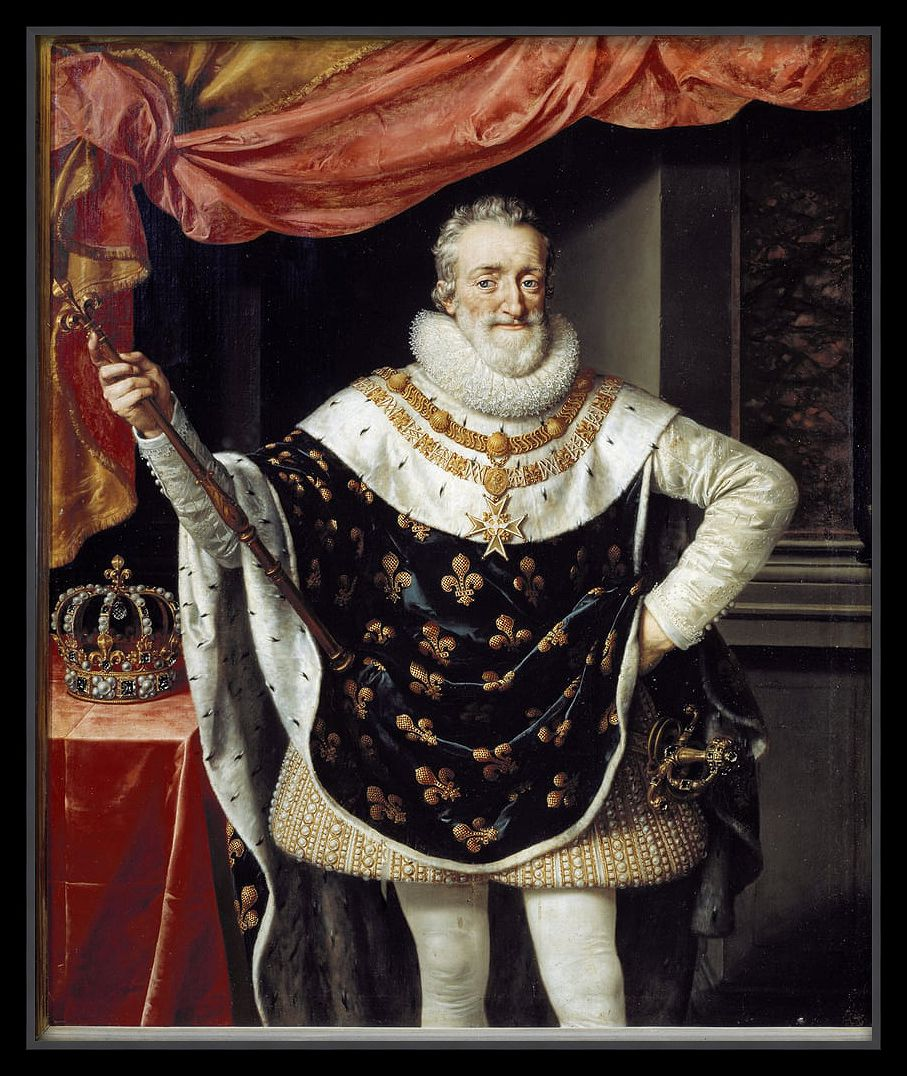
King Henry IV in his coronation robes

At the gates of the capital and while besieging it, in an attempt to recover it, the French monarch was assassinated in turn by Jacques Clément. It was then that the confrontation between the two sides took on a special virulence, because while the deceased king left Henry (IV) of Navarre, visible head of the Calvinist faction, as his heir, the representatives of the League proclaimed the old Cardinal of Bourbon king, under the name of Charles X.

Philip II was forced to intervene by supporting, first of all, those who represented orthodoxy, after the death of Charles X, dreaming of the possibility of placing his own daughter, Isabella Clara Eugenia, on the throne of France.

The Spanish monarch's commitment to the Catholic cause materialized by ordering Alexander Farnese, in the summer of 1590, to go with the Tercios of Flanders in support of the Catholics besieged in Paris. After a military campaign, Farnese forced Henry IV to lift the siege, leaving a Spanish garrison in the capital.

The possibility of sending troops to Languedoc, either from Italy or from Spain itself, was also studied. In fact, the army that carried out the "invasion" of Aragon under the command of Don Alonso de Vargas, was reunited with the cover story of "passing through France", where since 1590, a contingent of lancers had already been operating, which had been gathered with the contributions of different prelates and lords required for it.

It is within this interventionist framework that the expedition to Brittany must be placed, which responded to the desire to support the French Catholics in an area that constituted a firm bastion of the area, but which also offered the possibility of securing ports that would guarantee the control of communications with Flanders, serving at the same time as bases for the projected attack on England.

This idea was present in everyone's mind from the beginning, and the opinion of the Council of War constitutes an eloquent testimony, but it would manifest itself again on numerous occasions during the troops' occupation of Blavet. Thus, for example, on April 12, 1592, Pedro de Zubiaur expressed to the King his interest in the campaign to, among other things, "bring about the obedience of rebels of Flanders and reduce England, Scotland and Germany to our Holy Catholic Faith, if possible, even if it costs millions" and a year later, on May 5, 1593, he again sought the monarch's attention to provide everything necessary to the forces of Brittany, "because it is as important to be lord of this shore as to be lord of France, Flanders, Scotland, England and Germany".

== Tercio of Don Juan del Águila ==
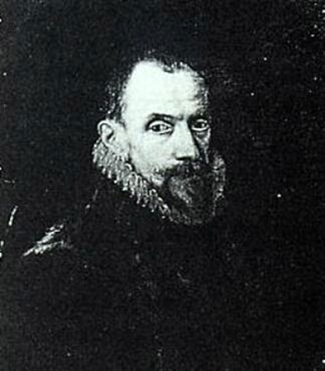
Don Juan Del Águila y Arellano

In order to carry out the planned intervention in Brittany, it was decided to send the tercio of the maestre de campo Don Juan del Águila, who was one of the three that, at that time, were attached to the Armada and which at the time of its embarkation had 15 companies, of which 14 were Spanish and 1 was Italian infantry, with a total of 3,013 soldiers listed as follows:

Officers & administrators	123
Pikemen	1,050
Arquebusiers	1,465
Musketeers	375

These numbers are considerably lower than those published by Fermández Duro who, based on a document from the Joan de Sans i de Barutell collection, stated that 4,578 infantry had left Ferrol, probably because he had also counted the soldiers who were part of the crews of each of the ships in the squadron.

The equipage of these men was quite deficient, as they lacked corseletes and helmets. So, shortly before their departure "they were given some from the other tercios". These shortcomings and those that they would later suffer during their stay in Brittany had a decisive impact on the morale of the troops, causing a high number of desertions which, together with sick leave, led to a significant reduction in their numbers, although they were later reinforced by way of new shipments of soldiers such as the 2,000 reinforcements and supplies delivered in April, 1591, 2,000 men transported by Martín de Bertendona in September 1592 or another 2,000 from the Army of Aragón, who were taken in 1593 under the command of Don Juan de Luna. In this way it was possible to maintain the strength of the expeditionary force at around 3,000 men.

To transport the tercio to Brittany, the creation of a squadron made up of 4 galeasses, 2 galleys and up to 31 vessels including ships, flyboats, pataches, galizabras and zabras under the command of Sancho Pardo was ordered. The trip that began on September 7, 1590, in the port of Ferrol was plagued with all kinds of incidents as a result of the bad weather they had to face and that forced them to enter the port of La Coruña twice, whence they were finally able to leave on September 19.

It is therefore not surprising that this calamitous voyage had a very negative effect on the condition of the soldiers which, at the time of their landing, caused such an unfavorable impression among those who, expecting the best soldiers in Europe, found men who were so broken, skinny and emaciated and who moved the Breton ladies to compassion who had to tend to the more than 600 sick among them, however shortly thereafter, the population's opinion changed substantially when they were able to witness the performance of these same men who, confronting the Calvinist troops led by Henri, Duke of Montpensier, Prince of Dombes, in a disciplined manner, were able to raise the siege under which the town of Dolo was subjected.

== Plan of action for the campaign ==
The Brittany campaign had special characteristics because it combined ground operations controlled by the infantry forces of Don Juan del Águila's tercio, important naval operations entrusted to a flotilla of vessels that remained permanently stationed in Blavet throughout its development, as well as the different squads that operated from the Spanish ports, having the occupied areas of French Brittany as support.

These two aspects need to be analyzed independently, devoting special attention to naval actions:

=== Ground operations ===
The Spanish troops landed in Brittany as auxiliaries to the Catholic League troops who were in that province under the command of the Duke of Mercœur. After raising the siege of Dolo, they began to besiege Hennebont where their troops dragged six large cannons from the galeasses, opening a sufficient breach to force the inhabitants to capitulate, delivering the town from a sack with 20,000 scudi ransom. By the end of 1590, Águila installed a garrison in Vannes, reduced the town of Crevique, and saw to the reinforcement of defenses of the places they occupied. They eventually began to act with a certain independence that was accentuated over the years, as a result of the importance that their troops had in relation to the League's troops as a whole. This allowed them to develop, amid the growing suspicion of the French, a strategy aimed at controlling the territory and those ports that were most important to Spanish interests.

Opposing them were the Prince of Dombes' troops that the Huguenots had in that area, and shortly thereafter the English expeditionary force commanded by John Norris had landed in northern Brittany, sent by Elizabeth I in support of the Prince.

This circumstance allowed direct confrontation between both contingents of auxiliary troops that reached its most dramatic expression when, on May 22, 1592, the Spanish came to the aid of the town of Craon, which was besieged by the Huguenot army with the support of the English and Germans. The performance of Águila's tercio was decisive, managing to raise the siege after inflicting a severe defeat on his opponents, causing a general rout after leaving more than 1,500 dead on the field and capturing all their weapons, ammunition and supplies.

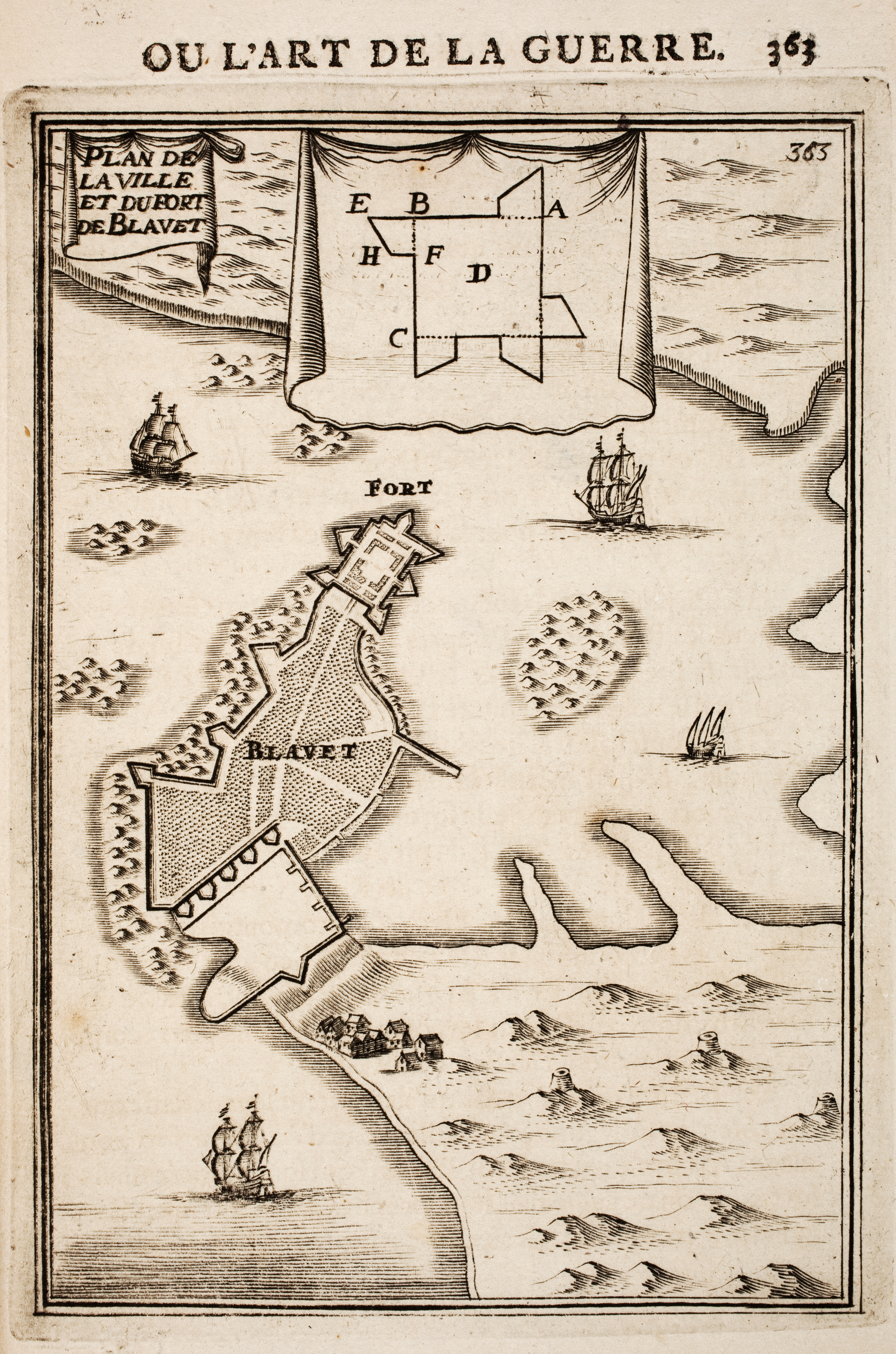
Fort del Águila (today known as Citadel of Port-Louis). Alain Manesson Mallet: Les travaux de Mars ou l'Art de la Guerre.

In fact, the initiative was always in the hands of the Spaniards who had a solid base in Blavet after the construction of the so-called "Fort del Águila" (Citadel of Port-Louis) by the men of the Tercio themselves with the help of the galley slaves, under the direction of the engineer Cristóbal de Rojas. These fortification works were carried out under very difficult circumstances, as evidenced by the fact that some days the rabble from the galleys could not work "because they spend four or five days without (tasting) a morsel of biscuit and of some the men who die, the doctors say it's from hunger". In addition, some of the materials had to be brought from Spain, as happened with the lime that was sent from Guipúzcoa aboard Pedro de Zubiaur's flyboats, sometimes arriving in very poor condition.

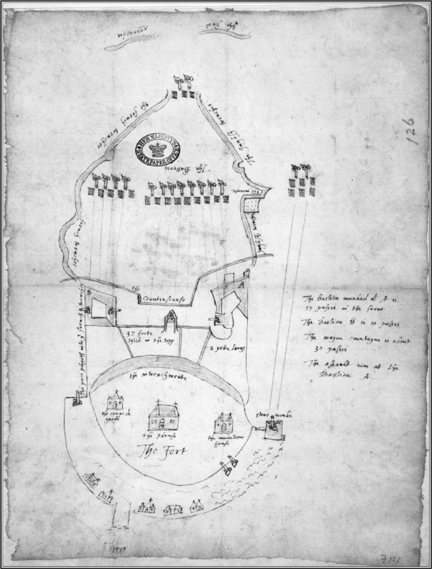
The Spanish "fuerte del León" at Crozon in a field sketch by English officer John Norreys in 1594.

But while control over Blavet remained firm throughout the entire campaign, the same could not be done in other important ports, as happened with Saint Malo, which was occupied by Don Juan del Águila in 1591, only to be abandoned shortly thereafter due to the lack of sufficient troops to keep it. This was especially true with the port of Brest, which was one of the priority objectives throughout all those years and where in 1594 the Quélern peninsula was occupied, leaving a force made up of three companies of infantry, roughly 400 men, under the command of Captain Tomé de Paredes. The so-called "Fort of the Lion (El León)" was hastily erected whence, exhibiting extraordinary courage, they remained for several months until, on November 19 of that same year, they succumbed to French and English forces led by Sir John Norris, who were vastly superior in numbers. Norris' troops gave no quarter during their storming of the fort, even to women and children. Only 13 Spaniards survived whereas 3,000 English and French troops were either killed in action or died from disease.

=== Naval operations ===
From the very beginning of the campaign, Spain stressed the importance of having safe ports at the entrance of the English Channel that would serve to guarantee communications with Flanders and as support bases for the planned invasion of England.

For this reason, when Águila's Tercio was dispatched in 1590, it was already arranged that some of the ships used in the transport of the troops would remain in Blavet in order to collaborate in some of the ground operations and try to exercise, at the same time, control of maritime traffic in that area of the channel.

In these missions, the different squadrons in charge of maintaining communications with Spain and even some larger units of the Ferrol Navy collaborated with the permanent flotilla of Brittany.

==== Permanent fleet in Brittany ====
Its composition varied throughout the campaign but pinnaces and round ships (similar to a Carrack) were always integrated into it.

Initially, two galleasses, three galleys, four barques, two flyboats and two zabras under the command of Captain Perochio Morán remained in Blavet, but the difficulties of the galleasses to operate in those waters and the poor condition of the galleys forced them to be replaced by four others sent from Spain under the command of Don Diego Brochero de la Paz y Anaya who, from that moment, took charge of the command of those forces whose numbers varied over the years depending on the losses suffered and the reinforcements that were sent to them.

==== Logistical support squads ====
The different squadrons that, dependent on the Ferrol Navy, operated from the north of the peninsula, took care of meeting the needs of the expeditionary force by sending it the materials, funds and troops it needed.

Pedro de Zubiaur's Pataches were the ones who, from Santander and El Pasaje, assumed most of these missions, also actively collaborating with the Brittany forces in the naval operations in the channel region. In those cases in which funds were transported, they were escorted by Juan de Villaviciosa's units.

==== Squadron of barques in Ferrol ====
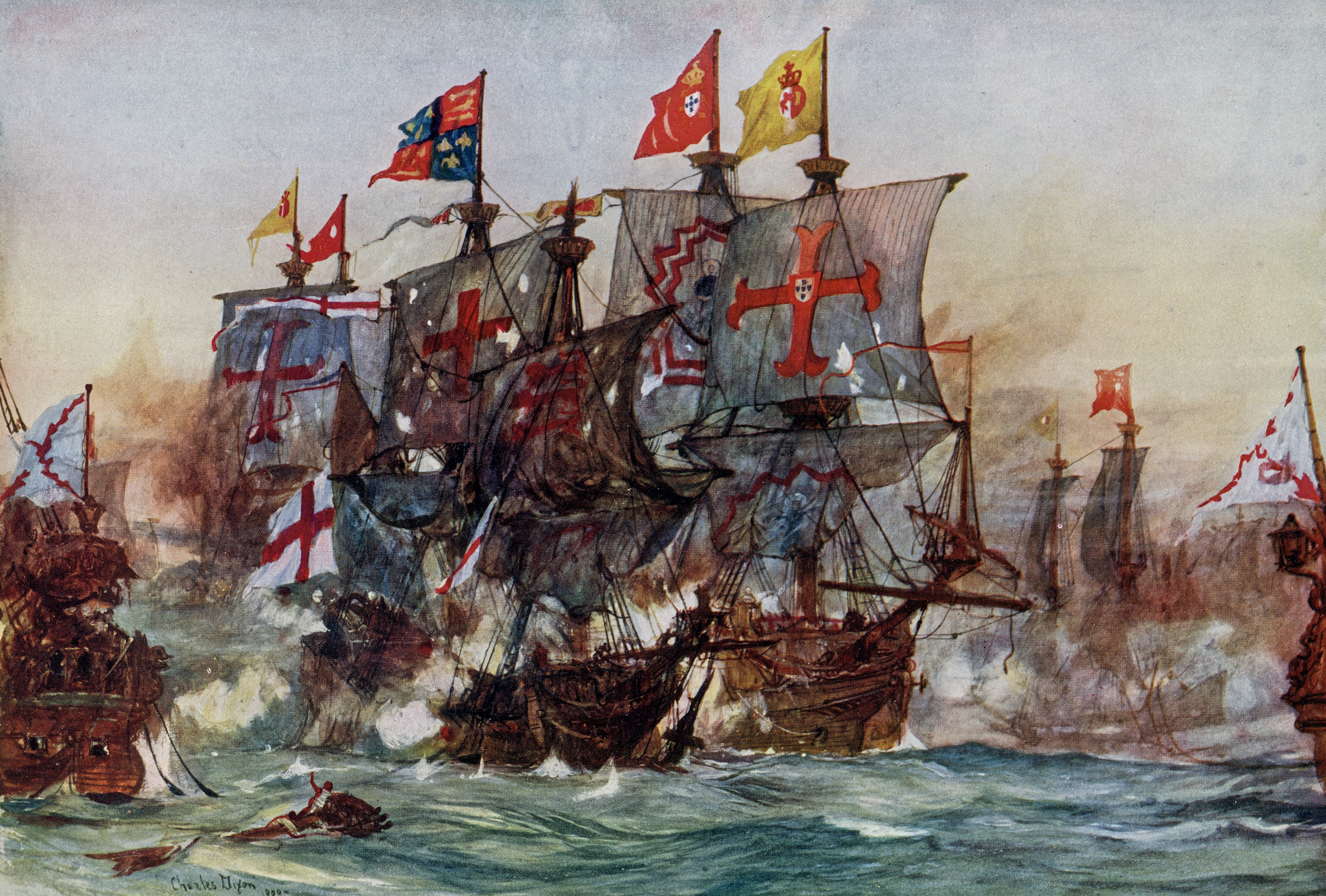
Revenge engaging several Spanish ships off Flores in the Azores 1591

Larger ships belonging to the Navy were used to send reinforcement troops, which remained in the port of Ferrol under the command of Don Alonso de Bazán. A sophisticated convoy system and improved intelligence networks frustrated English naval attempts on the Spanish treasure fleet during the 1590s. This was best demonstrated by Bazán's repulse of the squadron of 22 ships under the command of Lord Thomas Howard in 1591 off the Island of Flores near the Azores, who had intended to ambush the treasure fleet. It was in this battle that the Spanish captured the English flagship, the Revenge, after a stubborn resistance by its captain, Sir Richard Grenville, who was killed in action.

The transport, in October 1592, of 2,000 soldiers aboard 17 ships of the squadron of Martín de Bertendona, among which the galleon "San Bernabé" stood out, which was "the one who captured the English warship last year". This expedition, prepared with great secrecy, had great repercussions in Brittany, because, as Bertendona pointed out, "it caused the French great admiration and the Spanish so much happiness that I know not how to make it more perfect", because in that port "such large ships had never entered", and above all the presence of the "San Bernabé" gave rise to "many ladies and gentlemen coming to see it with whom, because it seemed more admirable, I made the demonstrations that I could".

Along with these diplomatic activities, Bertendona took advantage of the occasion to "take the marks of the port" and for the pilots to "probe the entire Ribera", finding that the port "although it has some rocks in some parts and other banks... it is very capable of harboring many ships and, among them, they can be ships of many tons". Hence, in his report, he highlights the importance that it has "to destroy the navigation of France and both of England and Flanders in it, because Algiers is not so harmful in the Levant".

== Tactical use of these naval forces ==
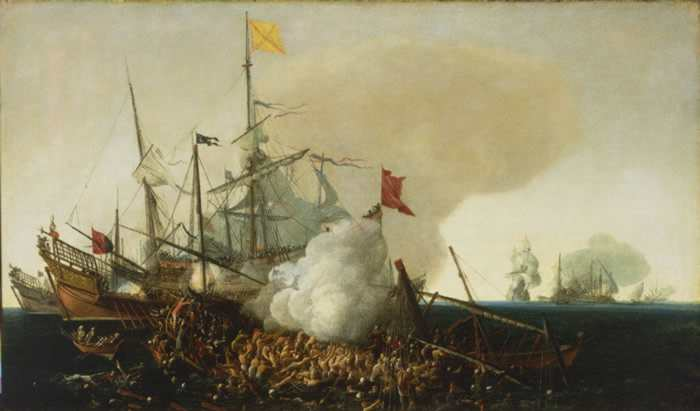
Spanish warships engaging corsairs

The naval objectives of the Brittany campaign were, at all times, clearly defined. On the one hand, support for the ground forces in certain actions and harassment of those coastal populations that were within the enemy's area of influence. On the other hand, to "make war on England and the rebels of Flanders and that they also capture as good prey all the ships and merchandise that they can, going and coming to said kingdoms and those towns that are with His Majesty and against the Holy Union".

But discrepancies arose when establishing the most suitable type of ships to achieve these objectives. In Brittany, two concepts of warfare at sea still clashed. Brochero represents those who consider that the galleys can play an important role despite the adverse circumstances, pointing out to Philip II that "eight galleys with eight hundred soldiers would be lords of all these ports and the coasts of England and without doubt they will do as they will".

For his part, Pedro de Zubiaur was in favor of round ships, indicating, not without a certain irony, that "three galleys are enough... two to go out and the other as a hospital", for the many sick men that bad weather caused among those poorly fed forces.

In fact, the criterion of a joint use of both types of vessels was imposed, responding to the criterion of Águila who considered it very convenient that "for the dams, (the galleys), they go coast to coast and the barques are made to go to sea because if some enemies appear and want to save themselves on land, they encounter the galleys". The truth is that the round ships were much more effective, even in support actions such as the relief of Blaye and the subsequent attack on Bordeaux.

Five months after Zubiar's naval victory in November, 1592, in which he used five flyboats to disperse a convoy of 40 English ships escorted by 6 warships, boarding the Flagship and setting it ablaze, and capturing 3 ships, his naval force engaged defeated an English naval force, commanded by Admiral Wilkenson, off the coast of Blaye. The initial stage had 4 Spanish pinnaces go up against 6 English galleons which were dispersed, thus allowing Villaviciosa's troops to disembark and relieve the Catholic forces. The final stage of the naval battle pitted 16 Spanish pinnaces and flyboats against some 60 ships with heavy casualties on both sides with victory ultimately favoring the Spaniards.

The action of the galleys was centered on the control of cabotage traffic and on actions to punish the coastal towns, in which frequent problems arose, since, as Águila pointed out, they used to enter "farms that the Catholics have on the land of non-Catholics" which is why he advised that "they do not roust people on that coast, nor burn places", because "the soldiers do a lot of damage without getting almost any benefit". On the other hand, there were, on occasions, serious excesses, as occurred when they looted a small island in the area, of Catholic obedience, in which they burned 15 boats and destroyed the churches, with some soldiers taking the sacred chalices.

In the early years, the action of these squads was very effective, managing to capture a considerable number of prizes and achieving a significant reduction in maritime traffic in that area, which affected both the enemy ports and those that were under control of the League, so that, as Brochero pointed out when referring to the presence of our ships on the coast of Brittany, "no favor has been granted to them by Your Majesty that they have esteemed less than this, because the prizes I have made have been felt both by them and the enemy himself, it seems to them that not having free traffic they lose much in their merchandise". As a result of this situation, the Catholic merchants came to present their claims to the Duke of Mercœur, understanding that the restrictions on traffic were leading them to ruin, using the subsidies they gave to the League as a weapon of pressure, because "if they did not have free trade, they couldn't give money to the duke."

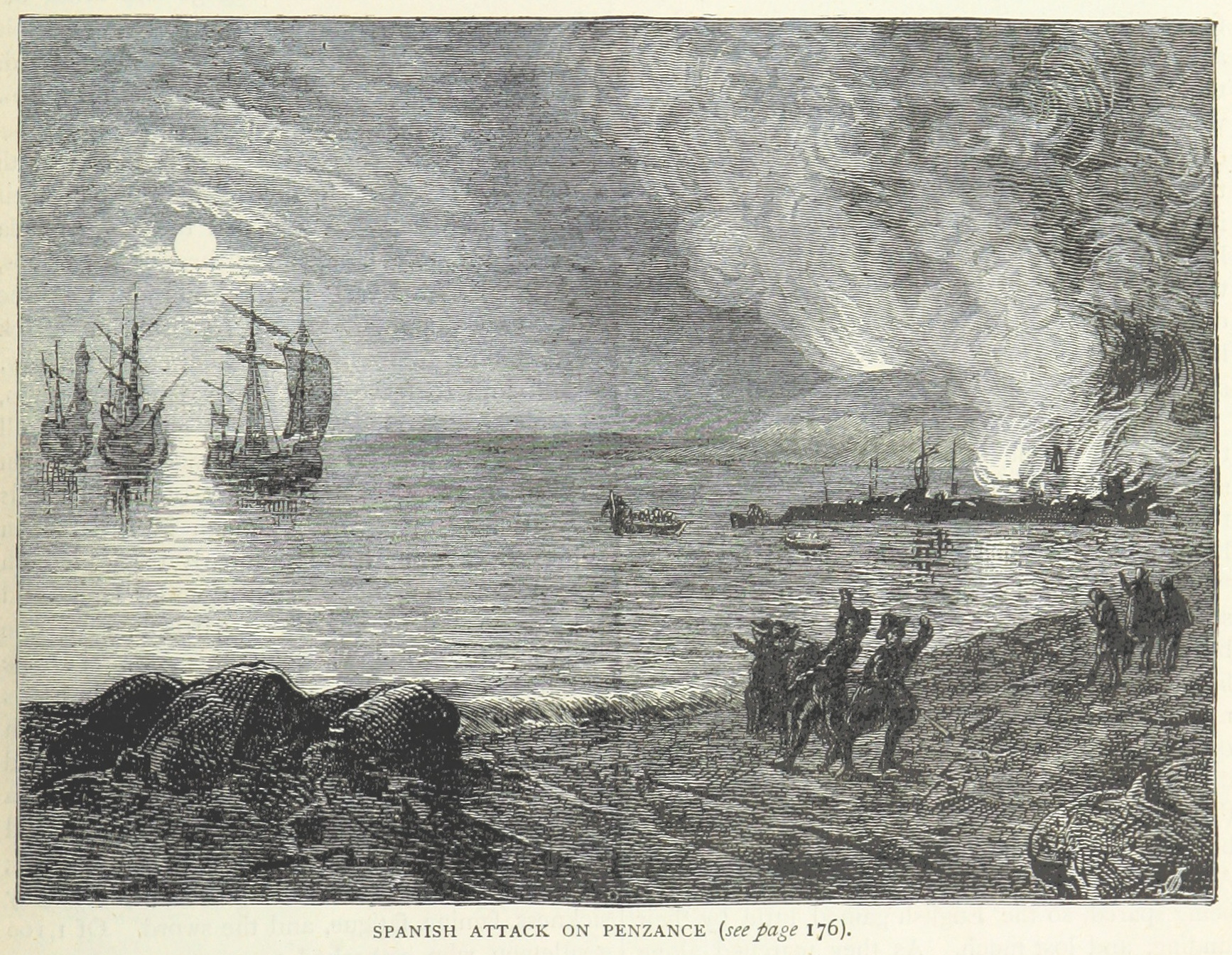
The Spanish attack Penzance

In the following years, captures decreased as a result of the suspension of activities and because those who sailed "come so prepared and with large fleets that it is difficult to break them". For this reason, Zubiaur was in favor of building some 250 or 300-ton galleons, which "with half a dozen of them would make a good squadron", and Brochero himself came to the conclusion that in order to face this new situation it was necessary to have "twelve ships, round and thicker than the present ones, to disrupt the enemy fleets, to come in order with warships".

However, use of the galleys continued in successive years, achieving a singular prominence in the expedition led by Carlos de Amésquita when he landed in Cornwall with 400 troops in August 1595. The Spanish made landfall in Mount's Bay, then sacked and burned Newlyn, Mousehole, Penzance, and Paul, beating a militia force under Francis Godolphin in the process. Another smaller raid on Cawsand bay, also in Cornwall, took place the following year but ended in failure. In June 1596 England sent a second Armada to Spain seizing Cadiz and holding the place for two weeks causing economic losses but failed to seize the treasure fleet.

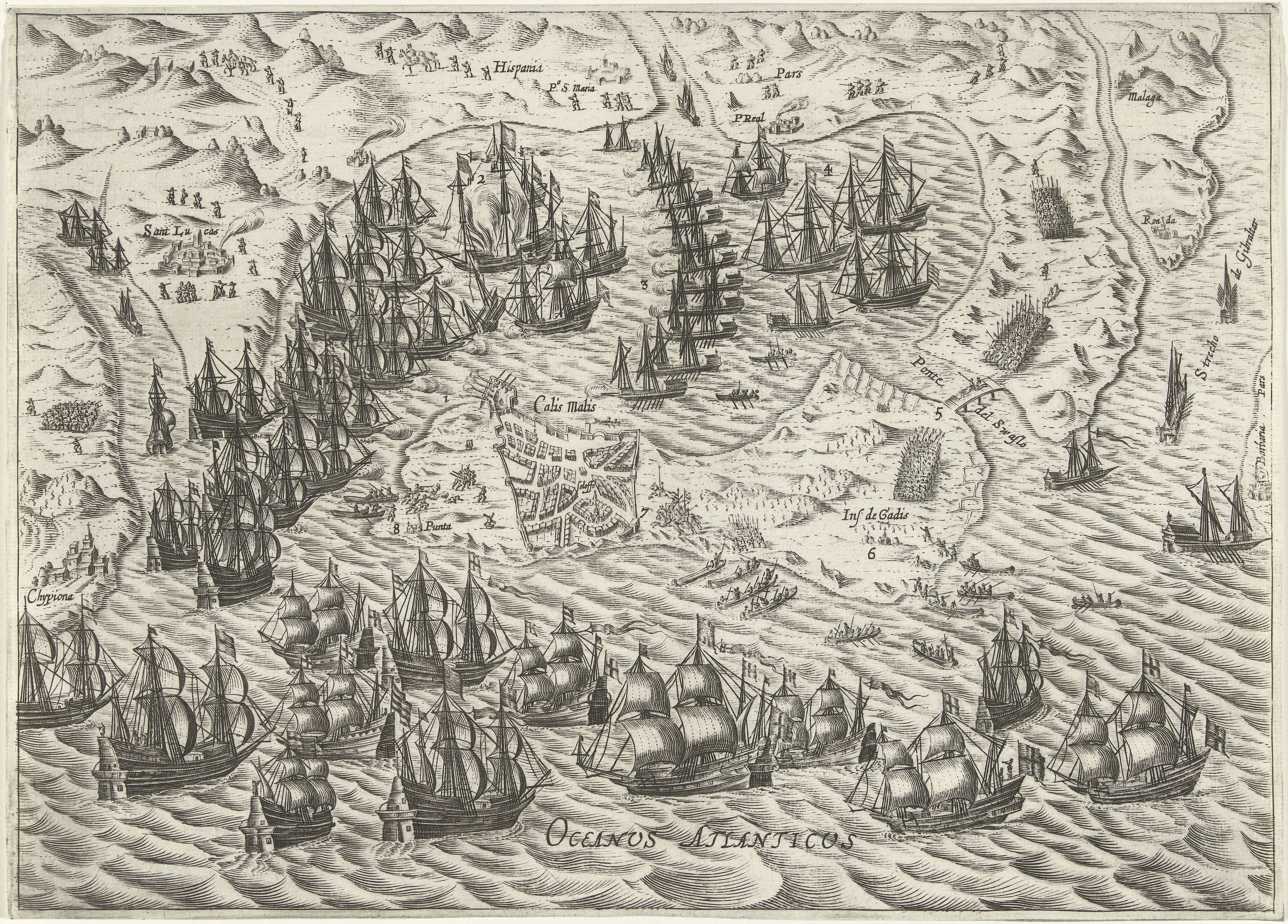
The battle of Cadiz Bay in 1596

But the decrease in the number of prizes and the fact that, as Zubiaur said, "there are no longer open villages to loot or burn", had a very negative impact on the maintenance of the units themselves, since, until then, the criterion of the Court was that they be maintained from the spoils of their captures.

The shortcomings became more evident every day and the clashes between the commanders that had already manifested themselves from the first moments intensified. Brochero as head of the permanent squad in Blavet was subordinate to Águila, with all the problems that this posed, as a consequence of the maestre de campos character and the discrepancies of criteria on the conduct of operations.

Faced with this situation, Brochero repeatedly requested to be relieved of his post from the King, alleging a lack of understanding with Águila and Philip II tried to please both by establishing a certain autonomy for Brochero, as long as they did not both concur in the same action. which did not satisfy either of them, since Águila argued "how different the services of both were and that because I went there first, it is right to keep the authority that I had before".

Although relations between these two commanders were never good, neither were those between Brochero and Pedro de Zubiaur better, who remained in Brittany under the authority of the former. The reasons for discrepancy arose, above all, when it came to distributing the spoils of the prizes and was manifested through childish reactions that are evident in the communications that both addressed to the King. To give a significant example, in November 1592, Zubiaur informed the monarch that when Brochero arrived in Blavet with his galleys "half of the soldiers who served in them left for the countryside and if they had not been embarked on these ships, they all would have fled". But in turn, and around the same time, Don Diego reports that "many sailors and two artillery constables and five or six artillerymen have fled from Pedro de Zubiaur's ships". This tension was what moved Zubiaur to request "Your Majesty, humbly, be served to do me the favor, if I have to serve on these ships, that I not have to be under Don Diego's command".

== Assessment of the campaign ==
The occupation of Brittany had an obvious impact on the course of Spain's confrontation with England, which, as has been stated, constituted one of the fundamental motivations for the campaign and for the prolongation of the occupation in that area when interest in the problem of succession to the French throne had already declined.

Ports like those of Blavet in Spanish hands constituted a clear threat to English interests and this was quickly understood. From them, effective control of maritime traffic was exercised, with hardly any losses and at the same time they actively collaborated with Bazán's fleet in actions of greater importance.

However, due to very different circumstances, the advantages derived from these strategic positions did not materialize because when, in response to the severe blow to Spanish interests caused by the sacking of Cadiz in 1596, it was decided to organize a new expedition against England, the situation in Brittany was already very deteriorated and, on the other hand, the adversity of the elements once again frustrated an attempt that, in more favorable circumstances and with the support that the port of Blavet represented, could have had a very different outcome.

Finally, the signing of the Peace of Vervins on May 2, 1598, put an end to Spain's presence on the French coast in which, amid countless hardships and sufferings, one of the most interesting and forgotten pages of Spain's Navy was written.

== See also ==
- Anglo-Spanish War (1625–30)
- European wars of religion
- French Wars of Religion
