= Citadel of Port-Louis =

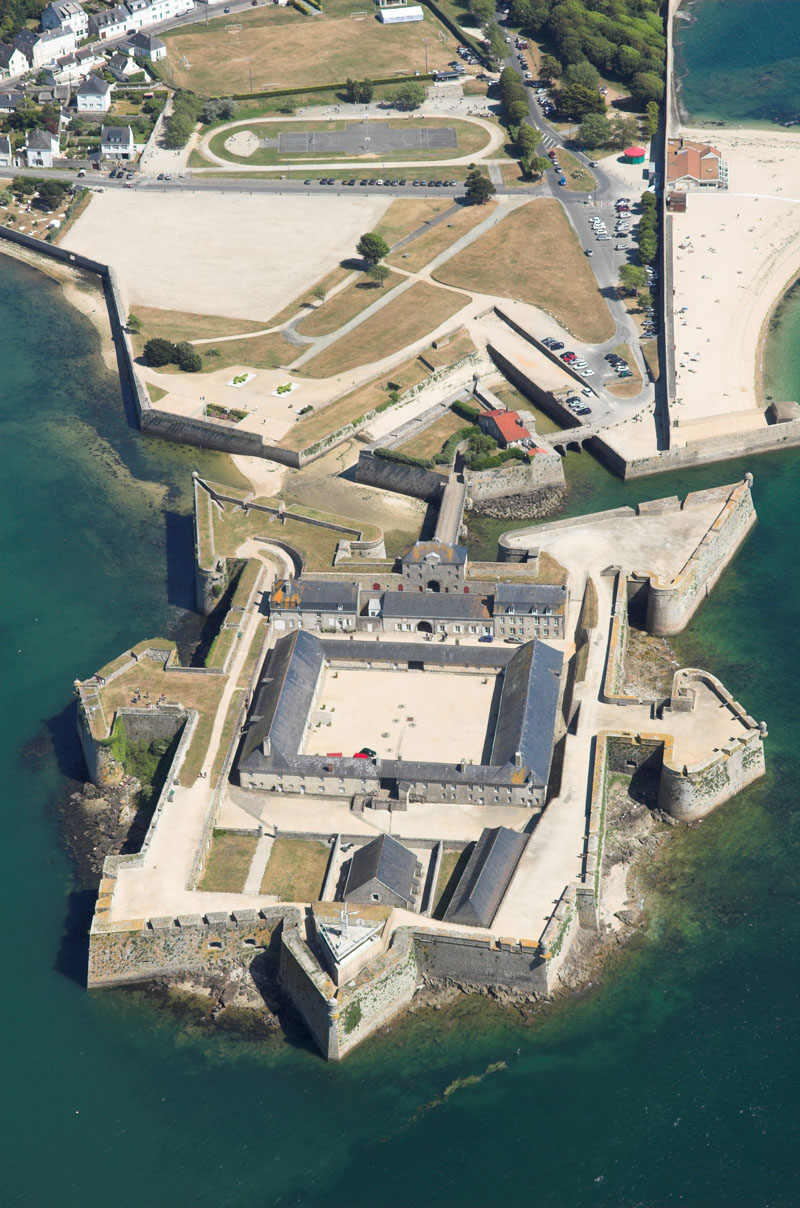

- Location within Morbihan

General information
- Type: Citadel
- Location: Port-Louis, Morbihan, France
- Coordinates: 47.71055°N 3.363798°W
- Construction started: 16th century
- Client: Juan del Águila

Design and construction
- Architect: Cristóbal de Rojas

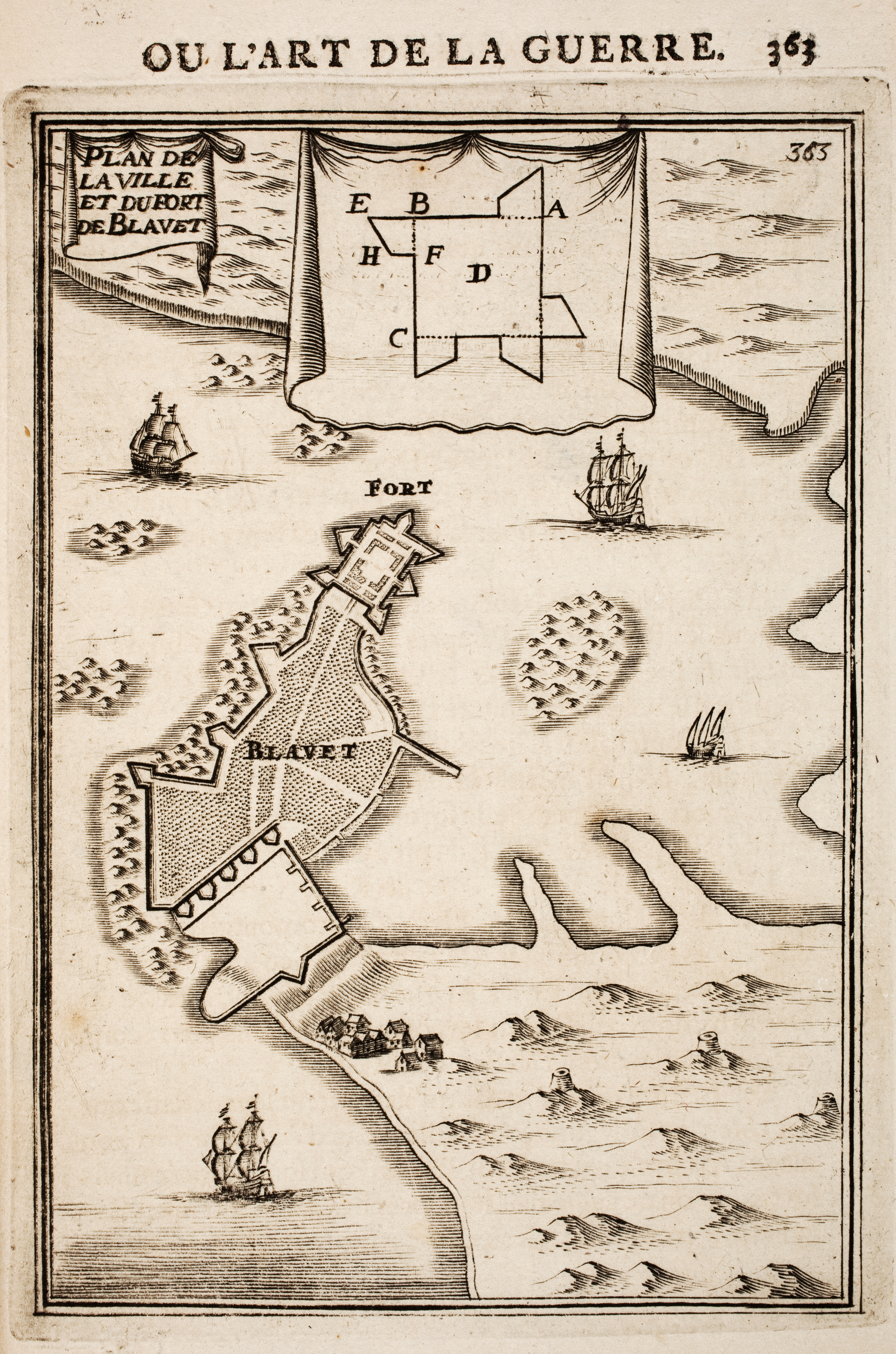
Citadel of Port-Louis. Alain Manesson Mallet: Les travaux de Mars ou l'Art de la Guerre.

The Citadel of Port-Louis is a citadel built in the 16th century by the Spaniards, then modified in the 17th century by the Frenchmen in Port-Louis (France).

== History ==
Used by Spain as a base of operations during the Brittany Campaign from 1590 to 1598.

== Museums ==
- Museum of the French East India Company (Musée de la Compagnie des Indes)
- Museum of Naval Weapons (Musée des Armes Navales)
- Museum of Port-Louis and the CItadel (Musée de Port-Louis et de la Citadelle)
- Museum of the Arsenal (Musée de l'Arsenal)

== Gallery ==
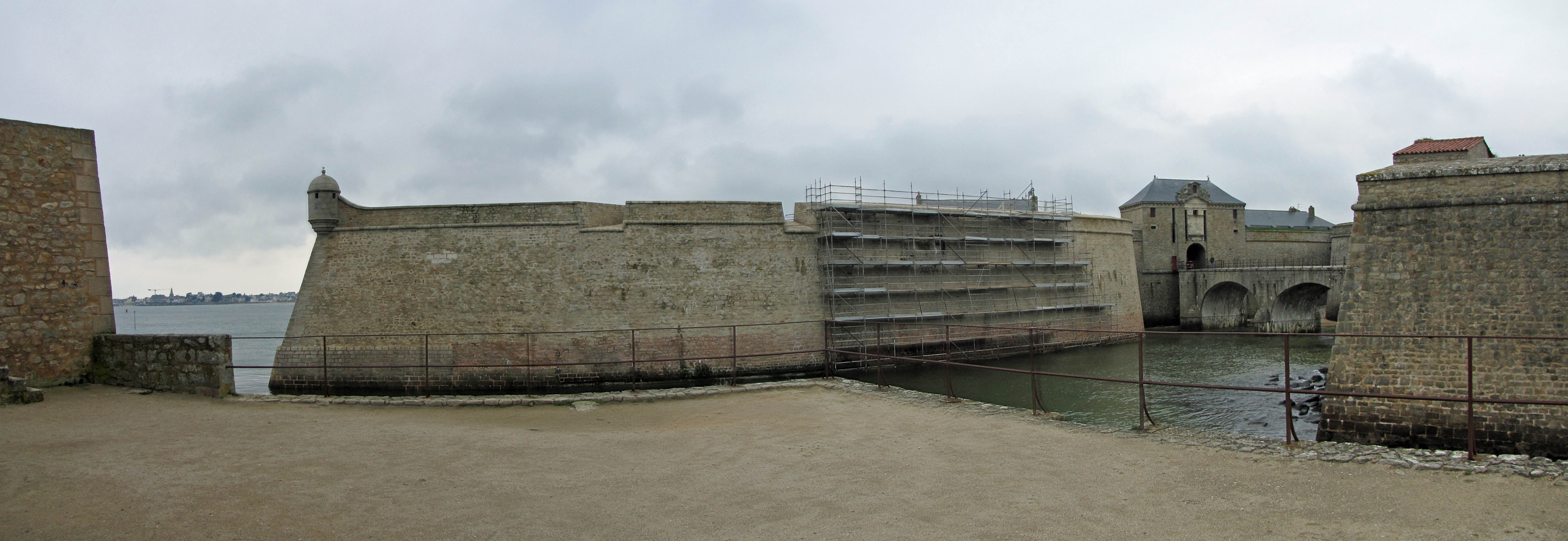

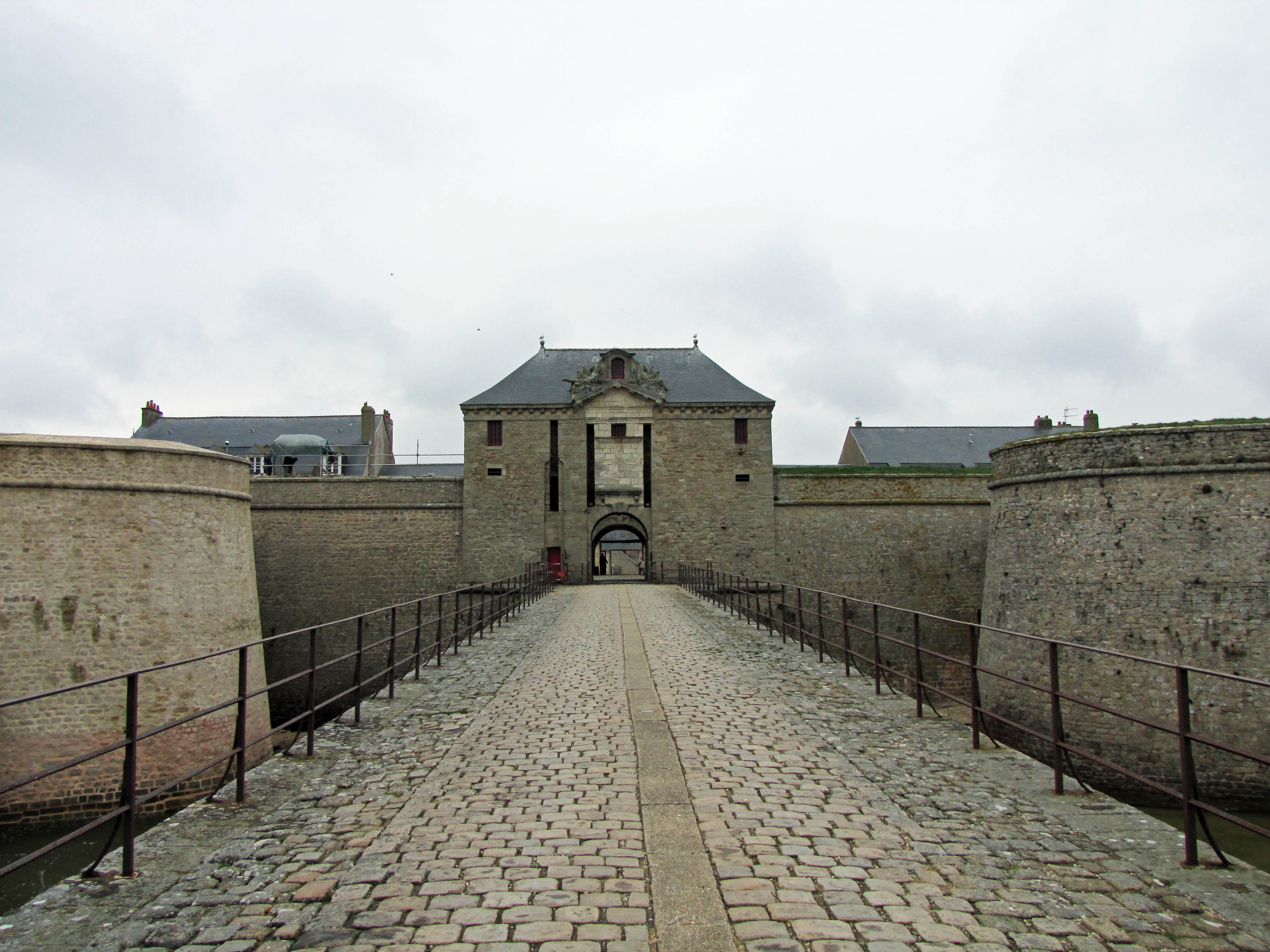

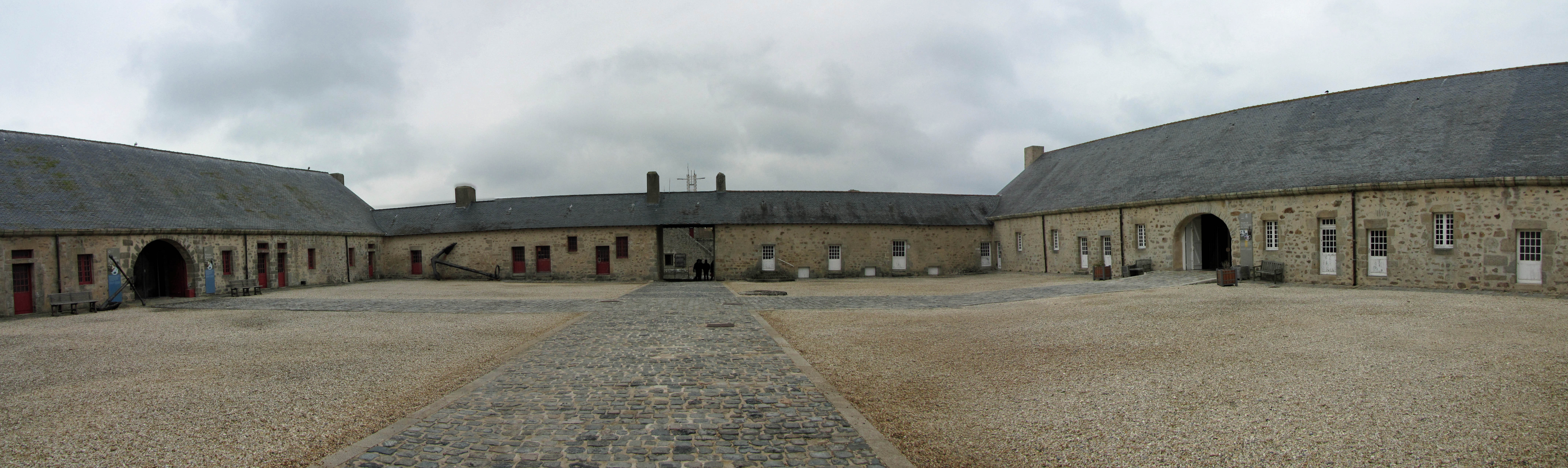

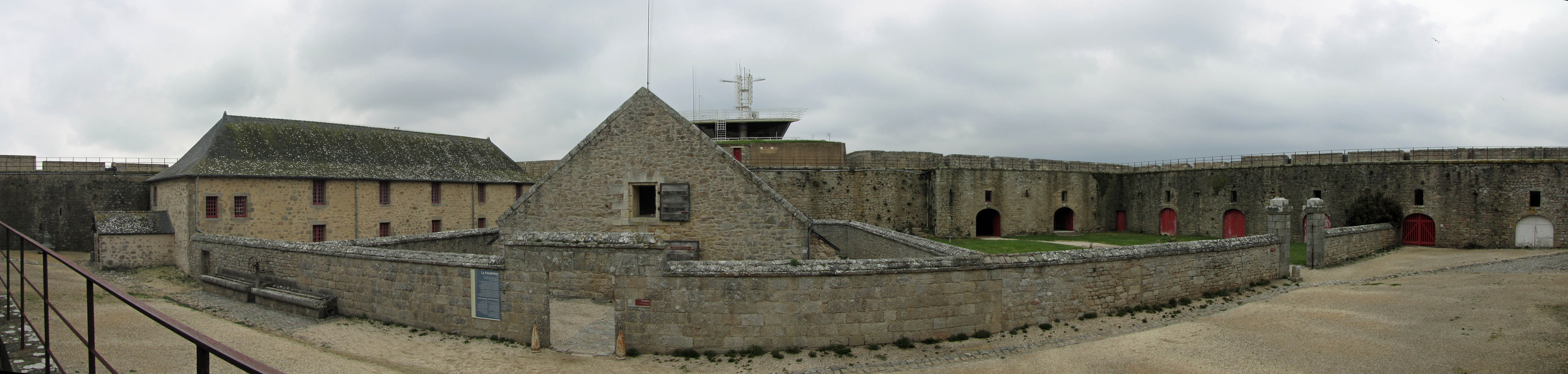

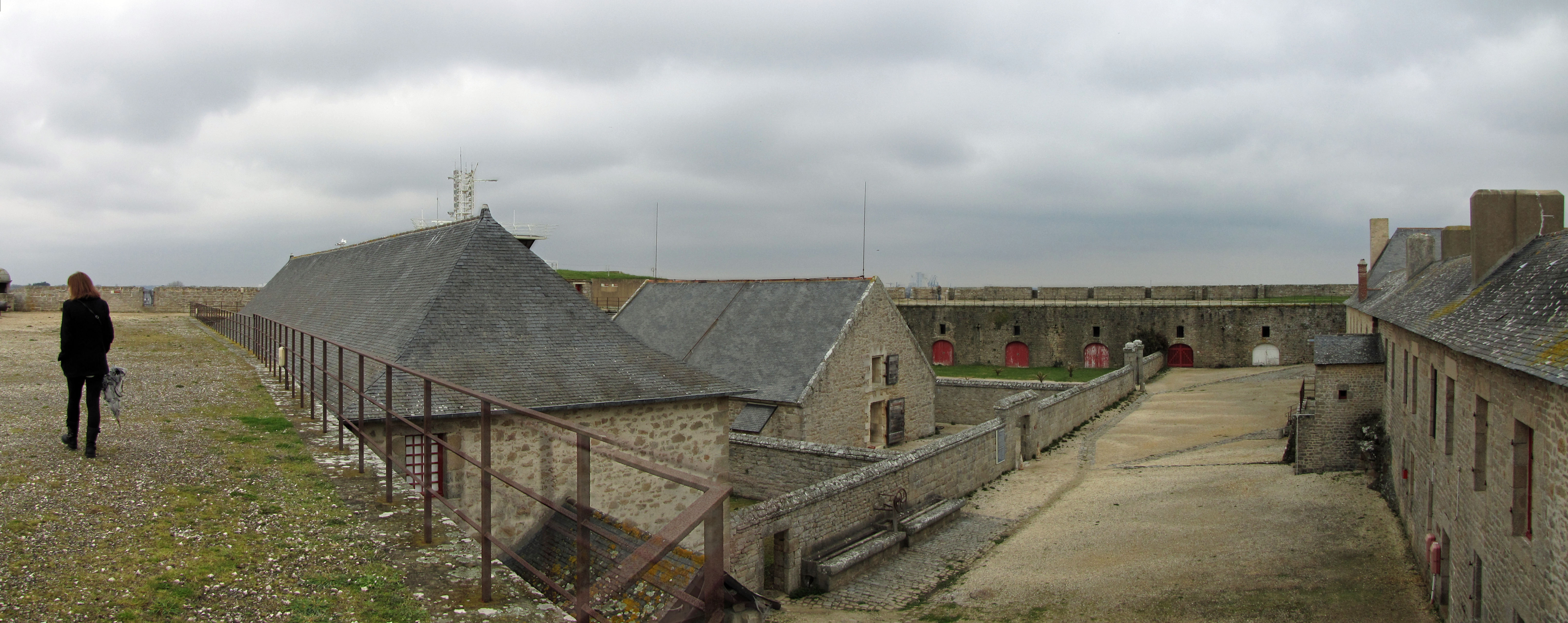

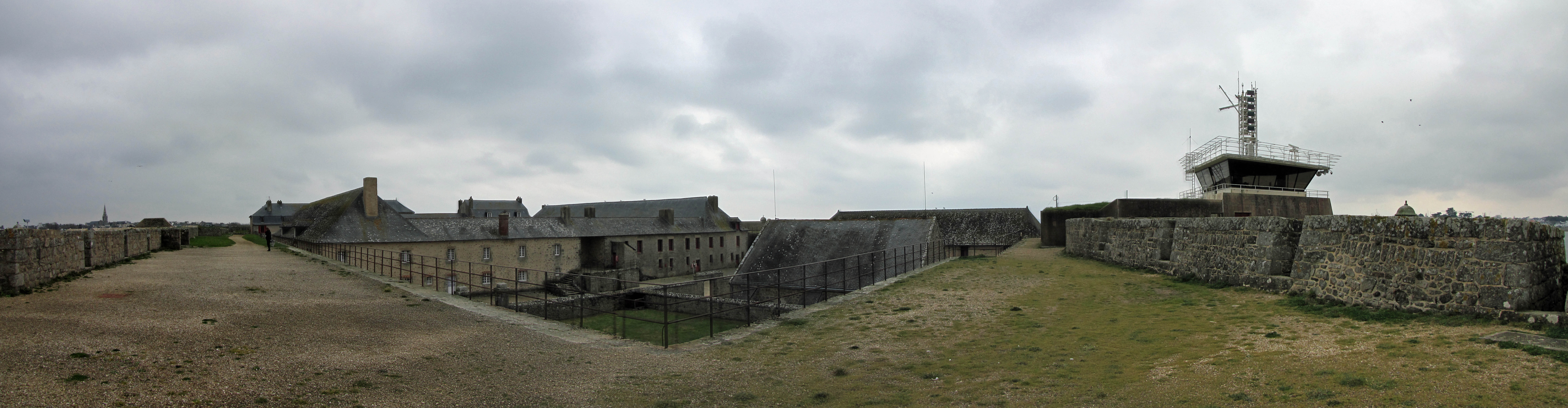

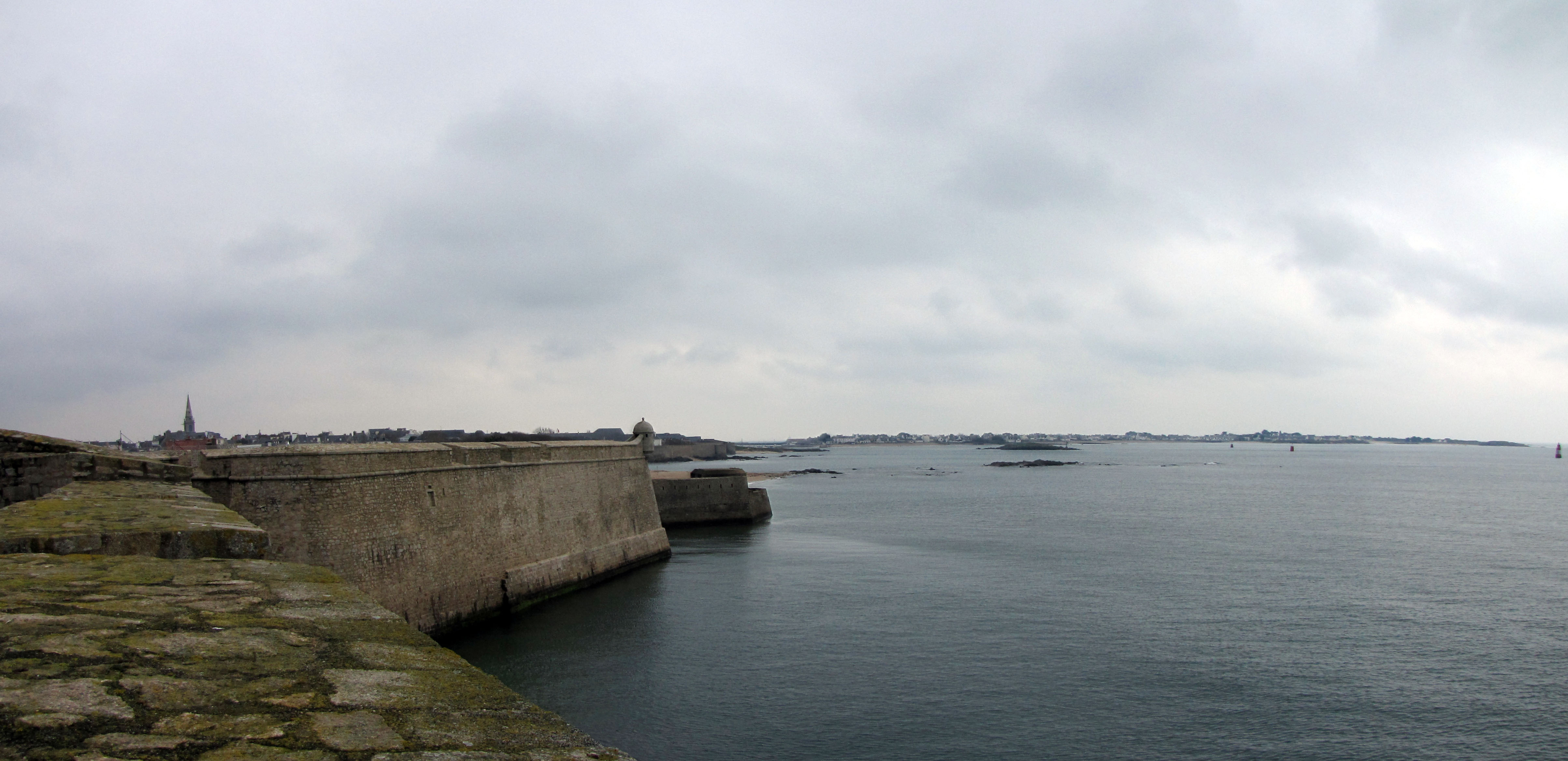

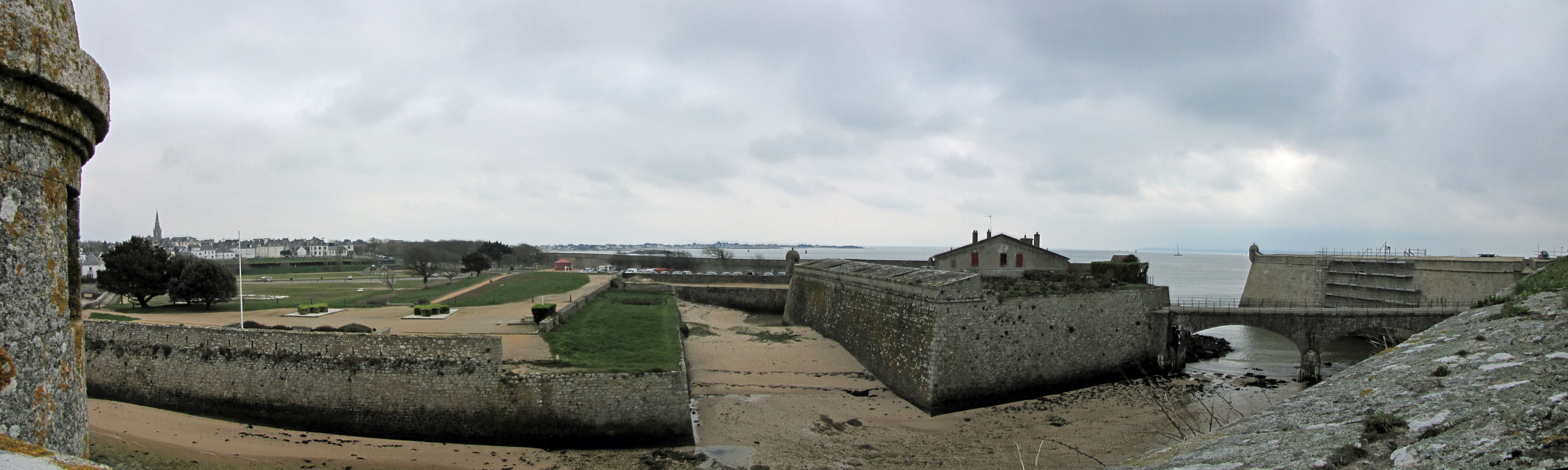

== Bibliography ==
- (in French) François Jégou, Le port de Blavet (Port-Louis) et Jérôme d'Arradon, seigneur de Quinipily : politique et religion, Vannes, Imprimerie de Galles, 1865, 23 p.
- (in French) Henri-François Buffet, Vie et société au Port-Louis : Des origines à Napoléon III, Rennes, Bahon-Rault, 1972, 509 p.
