= Martín de Bertendona =

Don Martín de Bertendona (1530 – 1607) was a Spanish Navy officer who served during the reigns of Philip II and Philip III. He participated in the Spanish Armada, and participated in the capture of the English galleon Revenge in 1591.

== Early life and naval service ==
Martín de Bertendona was born in Bilbao in 1530 to a prominent maritime family. His family owned a shipyard and fleet of merchantmen along with a long history of service in the Spanish Navy. One of the family's ships served as the royal flagship in 1522 and 1554. Bertendona was groomed for naval service as a young man, participating in his first military campaign in 1546. By 1583, Bertendona had risen through the Spanish Navy to command the fleet which guarded the Atlantic coast while the navy's commander-in-chief, Álvaro de Bazán, Marquis of Santa Cruz was occupied by the War of the Portuguese Succession.

In 1587, Bertendona played a senior role in planning, organising and leading the Spanish Armada. He commanded the Armada's Levant Squadron, a force of huge Mediterranean merchantmen carrying troops and military equipment for the planned invasion of England; his flagship was the largest vessel of the Armada, but was lightly armed and best suited for a close-range boarding action. Although Bertendona had correctly predicted the key challenges that the Armada would face, specifically the lack of secure deep-water anchorages available to the Spanish and the Royal Navy's ability to refuse close-quarter battles, he believed that the Spanish would still had won if they had pressed the attack at Gravelines. Bertendona brought his flagship safely home to Spain, and in 1589 participated in the defence of A Coruña against the English Armada. He subsequently served in the Brittany campaign.

== Capture of Revenge ==
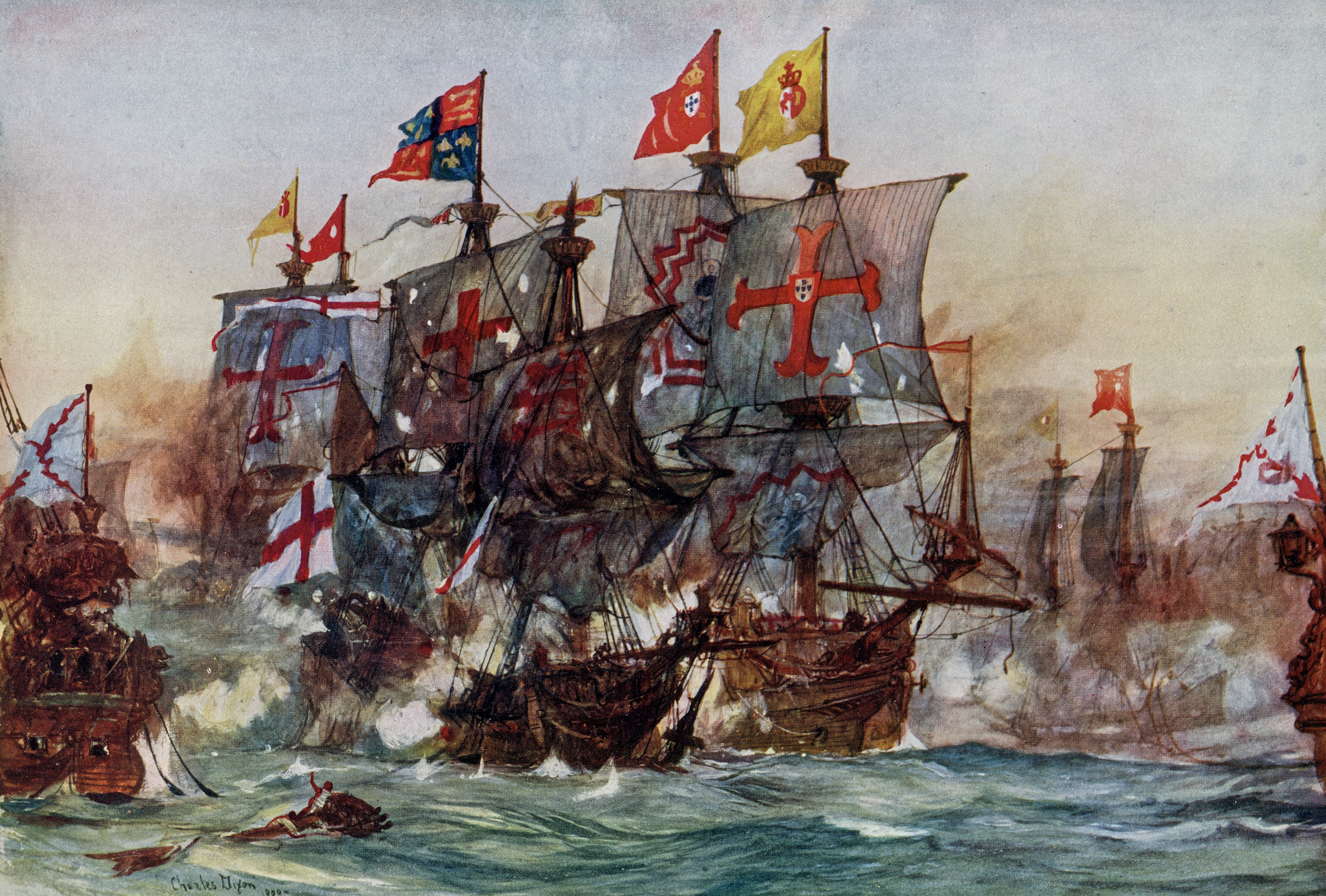
Painting of the capture of Revenge by Charles Dixon

During the Brittany campaign, an English fleet under Thomas Howard was surprised by the Spanish fleet led by Bertendona off Flores Island in 1591. Howard's fleet escaped to safety, but the race-built galleon Revenge under Sir Richard Grenville engaged in a rearguard action against the Spanish. The rearmost English ships were overhauled by the two ships of Bertendona's Bilbao squadron; the larger San Felipe reached Revenge first, but failed to board her and was driven off by English gunfire. Bertendona's flagship, the smaller San Bernabé, caught up to Revenge and slowed her by slicing the ship's bowsprit through her foresail then moving close alongside.

San Bernabé proceeded to engage in a long and bloody duel with Revenge using artillery and musket fire. Bertendona orders his men to remain cover and did not attempt to storm Revenge's decks, a tactic that proved disastrous for three other Spanish ships that attempted it as dusk fell. By the next morning, Grenville was mortally wounded and his remaining crew struck the colours to San Bernabé. However, the Spanish were unable to incorporate Revenge into their navy as the ship sunk in a cyclone shortly afterwards.

== Later career and death ==
In 1592, Bertendona led a squadron across the Bay of Biscay in support of the Catholic League, with the repaired San Bernabé as flagship. From 1596 to 1597, Bertendona was involved as a senior subordinate commander in renewed Spanish preparations to invade England, but these were hindered by delays and bad storms. In early 1598, he assumed overall command of the Spanish navy and led a fleet through the English Channel to Spanish Netherlands in order to fight in the Eighty Years' War. Bertendona argued unsuccessfully for another invasion of England, and after the Peace of Vervins he returned to Spain. Planned expeditions in 1601 and 1602 were called off by his superiors, and as Bertendona had also commanded the naval forces of his home province of Biscay since 1588, he focused his energies on the construction of a new fleet, including fast vessels inspired by the Dunkirkers. Bertendona lived to see peace with England in 1604; he died three years later in 1607.

== Sources ==
- C.R. Boxer, "The Papers of Martín de Bertendona, a Basque admiral of Spain's Golden Age, 1584-1623", Indiana University Bookman 10 (1969), pp. 3–23
- D. Goodman, Spanish Naval Power, 1589-1665: Reconstruction and Defeat (Cambridge 2003)
- C. Lloyd, "Further English Voyages to Spanish America, 1583-1594" (book review), Mariner's Mirror 38-40 (1952), p. 160
- M. Gracia Rivas, "La campaña de Bretaña (1590-1598): una amenaza para Inglaterra", in IX jornadas de historia marítina después de la Gran Armada, la historia desconocida, 1588-16--: ciclo de conferencias, abril 1993 (Cuadernos monográficos del Instituto de Historia y Cultura Naval 20, Madrid 1993), pp 41–56
