= Battle of Craon =

1592 battle

- Part of the Brittany campaign
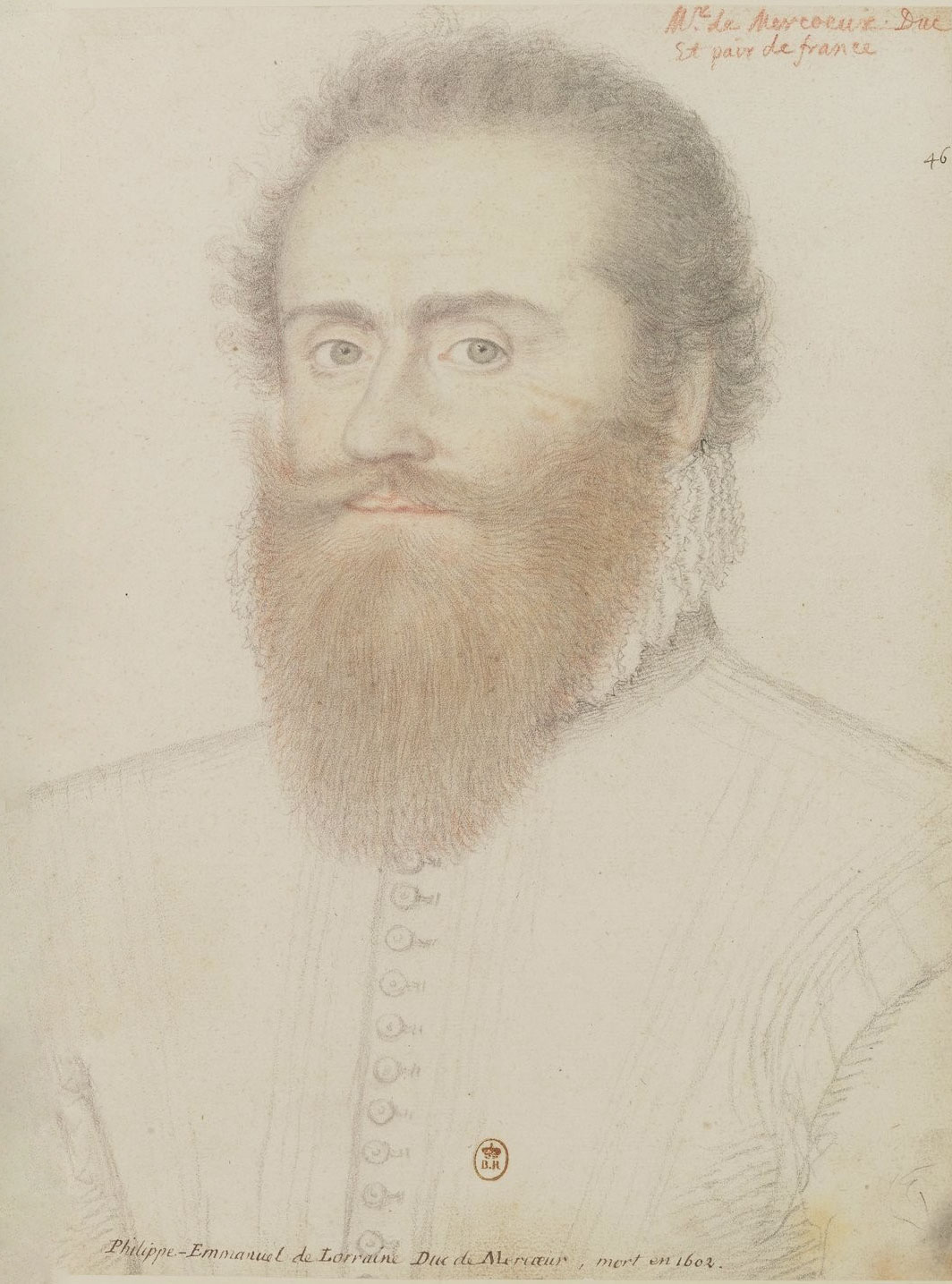
- An illustration of the Duke of Mercœur
Date	21–24 May 1592
Location	Craon, Mayenne 47.8489°N 0.9486°W
Result	Catholic League-Spanish victory

Belligerents
Catholic League; Spain	France; England

Commanders and leaders
Juan del Águila; Duke of Mercœur	Duke of Montpensier; Prince of Conti

Casualties and losses
24 killed and wounded	1,500 killed Hundreds captured

The Battle of Craon took place during the Brittany campaign of the French Wars of Religion in Craon, Mayenne between 21–24 May 1592. It was fought between a French Crown army under Henri de Bourbon, Duke of Montpensier and François de Bourbon, Prince of Conti and a joint Catholic League and Spanish force; the French Crown troops were reinforced by a contingent of English soldiers. The battle occurred during a French Crown siege of Craon directed by Henry of Navarre, which was lengthened by the defending garrison being supported by a Catholic League army recruited by Philippe Emmanuel, Duke of Mercœur. Ultimately, a Spanish force led by Juan del Águila defeated the besiegers and relived the city.

== Background ==
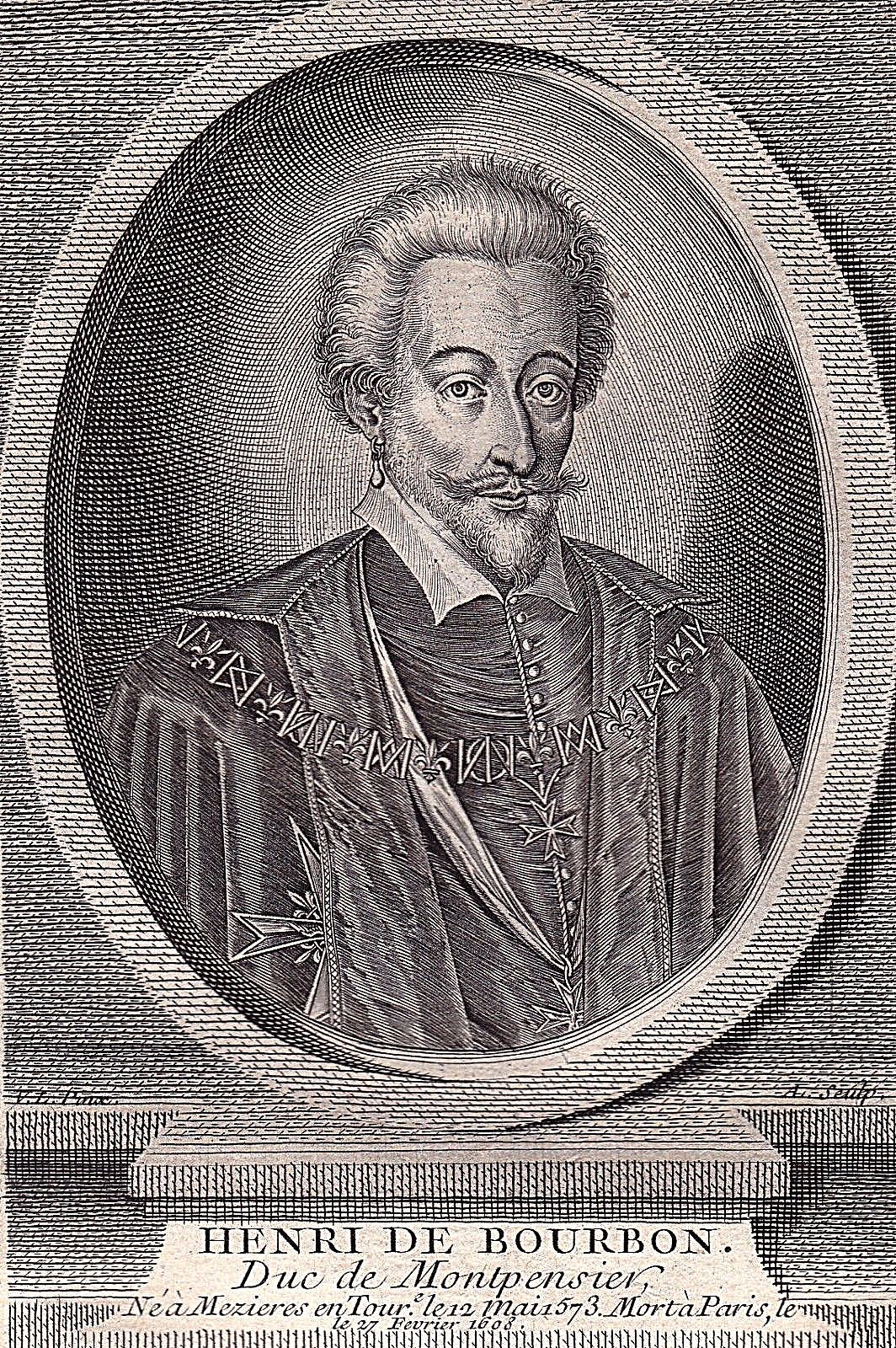
Henri de Bourbon, Duke of Montpensier, the commander of the French Crown army during the battle.

The commander of the Catholic League of France in the region, the Duke of Mercœur, Governor of Brittany, ordered his chief lieutenant, Urbain de Laval Boisdauphin, to strengthen Craon. In 1590, Mercœur rebelled against the accession to the throne of France of Henry of Navarre and became the head of the Catholic League of Brittany, aiming to restore the autonomy of the former Duchy, and proclaimed protector of the Catholic Church in the region of Brittany. The Duke of Mercœur had the support of the Catholic King, Philip II of Spain, who sent him 7,000 Spanish soldiers who landed at Blavet (Port Louis) under the command of Don Juan del Águila.

On 8 February 1592, Henry of Navarre decided to take the city of Craon. His cousins, the Duke of Montpensier and François de Bourbon, Prince de Conti, secretly gathered together in Laval to organise the attack. Montpensier arrived with his army on 14 April 1592 and laid siege to the town. He was aided by 1,200 English troops led by Anthony Wingfield (in Sir John Norris' absence) and 800 German mercenaries. Then on 20 May 1592, Mercœur and Sablé arrived with their armies to defend Craon.

== Battle ==
The defense of the city of Craon by Catholic League troops against the French Crown soldiers of Montpensier and Conti was fierce. On 22 May 1592, the Spanish-Catholic League army reached Craon under Don Juan del Águila and the Duke of Mercœur. The Spanish-Catholic League troops charged against the left flank, taking by surprise the Anglo-French besiegers. At the same time, the defenders angrily attacked the Anglo-French right flank, finally achieving a victory. Under cover of night, Montpensier retired to Laval and Rennes.

The Spanish troops captured all the artillery, equipment and supplies being used by the Anglo-French besiegers. English troops captured by the Spanish were all summarily executed partly in retaliation for the killings of survivors of Spanish Armada by English authorities in Ireland.

== Aftermath ==
Jérôme d'Arradon, a French commander who was entrusted with the command of Hennebont and Blavet by Mercœur, quickly realized that the Spaniards behaved as their conquerors and did not recognize any authority other than their King, Philip II. Just a few days later, Laval fell into the hands of the Catholic League. On 23 May 1592, the Prince of Conti retreated into the Château-Gontier. The Duke Mercœur and the Marquis of Sablé entered Laval and took the Château-Gontier. Boisdauphin took command of Laval, and Louis Champagné became Governor of Château-Gontier.

== Bibliography ==
- Pierre Miquel. Les Guerres de Religion. Club France Loisirs (1980) ISBN 2-7242-0785-8
- Abbé Angot. Un soldat catholique de la bataille de Craon (23 mai 1592). 1896. . (in French)
- Martínez Laínez, Fernando/Sánchez de Toca, José María. Tercios de España. La infantería legendaria. Editorial EDAF 2006. (in Spanish)
- Holt, Mack P. (2005). The French Wars of Religion (1562–1629). ISBN 0-521-83872-X.
- Thompson, J. W. (1909). The Wars of Religion in France, 1559–1576.
- Knecht, Robert J. (1996). The French Wars of Religion (1559–1598). Seminar Studies in History (2nd ed.). New York: Longman. ISBN 0-582-28533-X.
- MacCaffrey, Wallace T. (1994). Elizabeth I: War and Politics, 1588–1603. Princeton University Press. ISBN 9780691036519.
- John S Nolan. Sir John Norreys and the Elizabethan Military World (University of Exeter Press. 1997) ISBN 0-85989-548-3
- Chisholm, Hugh. Edition (1911). Encyclopædia Britannica (Eleventh ed.). Cambridge University Press.
