= Peace of Vervins =

1598 treaty between Henry IV and Philip II

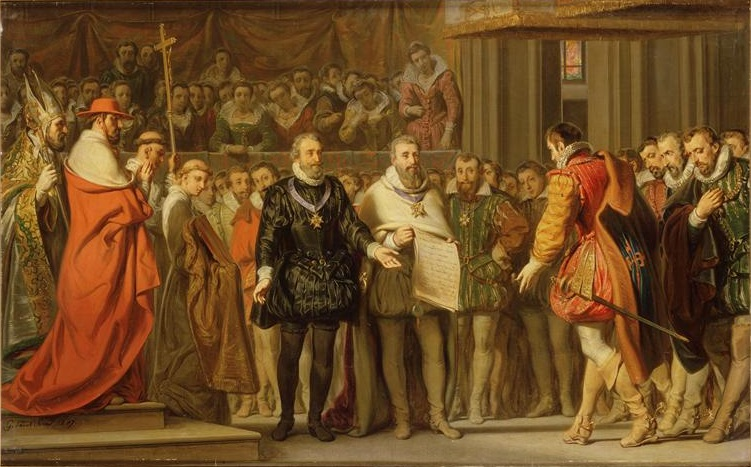
Signature du traité de paix de Vervins by Gillot Saint-Evre (1837)

The Peace of Vervins or Treaty of Vervins was signed between the representatives of Henry IV of France and Philip II of Spain under the auspices of the papal legates of Clement VIII, on 2 May 1598 at the small town of Vervins in Picardy, northern France, close to the territory of the Habsburg Netherlands.

== Background ==
Henry had declared war on Spain in 1595, and after victory at the Siege of Amiens in 1597, he then promulgated the Edict of Nantes, on 13 April the following year. The Edict effectively brought the Wars of Religion in France including the Brittany Campaign to an end, which had spread to a European-wide conflict.

== Treaty ==
The parties to the treaty were hosted by Guillemette de Coucy, co-seigneur of Vervins, in her Châteauneuf de Vervins (fr) (Note: The château still exists, and may be visited by the public.) Close to the Spanish Netherlands, the Thiérache region (Note: Today part of the departement of Aisne) had suffered much damage in the recent fighting. Its numerous 16th-century fortified churches still bear witness today.

The terms were worked out under the auspices of the papal legate of Clement VIII, Alessandro de' Medici, (Note: Alessandro was briefly Pope Leo XI in April 1605) the "architect of the treaty", according to Bernard Barbiche.

By its terms, Philip recognized the formerly Protestant Henry as King of France and withdrew his forces from French territory, depriving the remnants of the faltering Catholic League of their support. Additionally, the vitally important city of Calais and the coastal fortress of Risban, which had been captured by the Spaniards in 1596, were returned to the French.

== Aftermath ==
Philip died on 13 September, but his heir Philip III respected the terms of the treaty. Charles Emmanuel I, Duke of Savoy, who had held back from the treaty, was defeated by Henry IV in 1599. He signed a separate Treaty of Lyon with Henry in 1601.

Some historians have seen this as the final defeat of Philip II, who had furthered dynastic causes through championing ultra-Catholic principles, and a sign of the long downfall of Habsburg Spain and the gradual rise in European hegemony of France during the ensuing Grand Siècle.

== See also ==
- List of treaties
- Bouillon, Belgium
- House of La Marck
- French–Habsburg rivalry

== Sources ==
- Benedict, Philip (2007). Graphic History: The Wars, Massacres and Troubles of Tortorel and Perrissin. Librairie Droz.
- Braudel, Fernand (1995). The Mediterranean and the Mediterranean World in the Age of Philip II. Vol. 2. University of California Press.
- Golden, R.M., ed. (1988). The Huguenot Connection: The Edict of Nantes, Its Revocation, and Early. Martinus Nijhoff Publishers.
- Lindberg, Carter (1996). The European Reformations. Blackwell Publishing.
- Wolfe, Michael (1999). "Vidal and Pilleboue 1998". The Sixteenth Century Journal.
