= Alain Manesson Mallet =

French cartographer and engineer

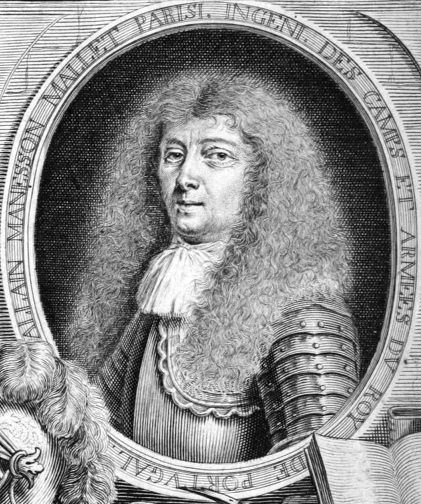
Portrait of Mallet

Alain Manesson Mallet (1630–1706) was a French cartographer and engineer. He started his career as a soldier in the army of Louis XIV, became a Sergeant-Major in the artillery and an Inspector of Fortifications. He also served under the King of Portugal, before returning to France, and his appointment to the court of Louis XIV. His military engineering and mathematical background led to his position teaching mathematics at court.

His major publications were Description de L'Univers (1683) in 5 volumes, and Les Travaux de Mars ou l'Art de la Guerre (1684) in 3 volumes

His Description de L'Universe contains a wide variety of information, including star maps, maps of the ancient and modern world, and a synopsis of the customs, religion and government of the many nations included in his text. It has been suggested that his background as a teacher led to his being concerned with entertaining his readers. This concern manifested itself in the charming harbour scenes and rural landscapes that he included beneath his description of astronomical concepts and diagrams. Mallet himself drew most of the figures that were engraved for this book.

== Images ==
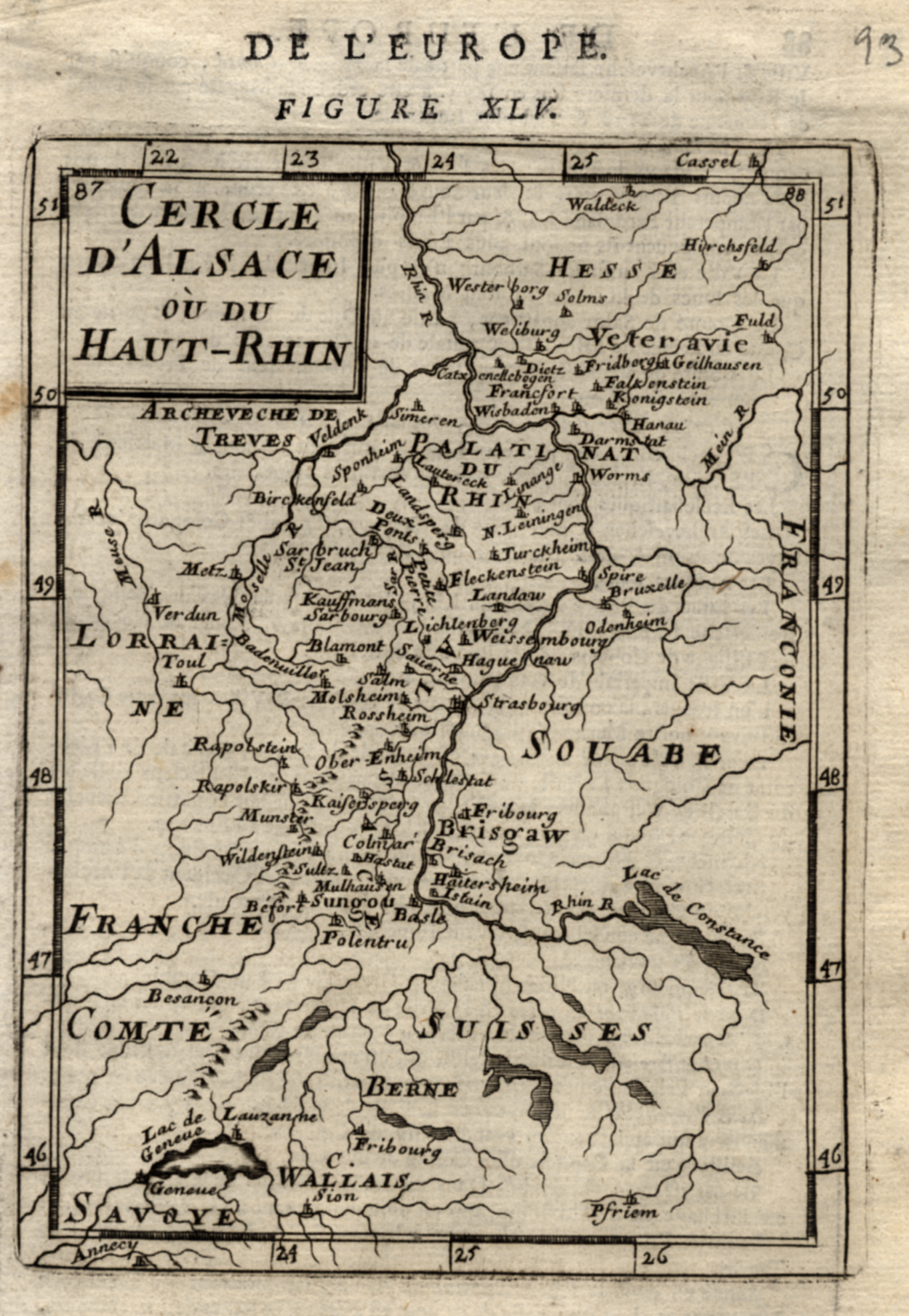
Map from Description de L'Univers.

Page from Les Travaux de Mars ou l'Art de la Guerre showing St. George Cathedral in Venice.

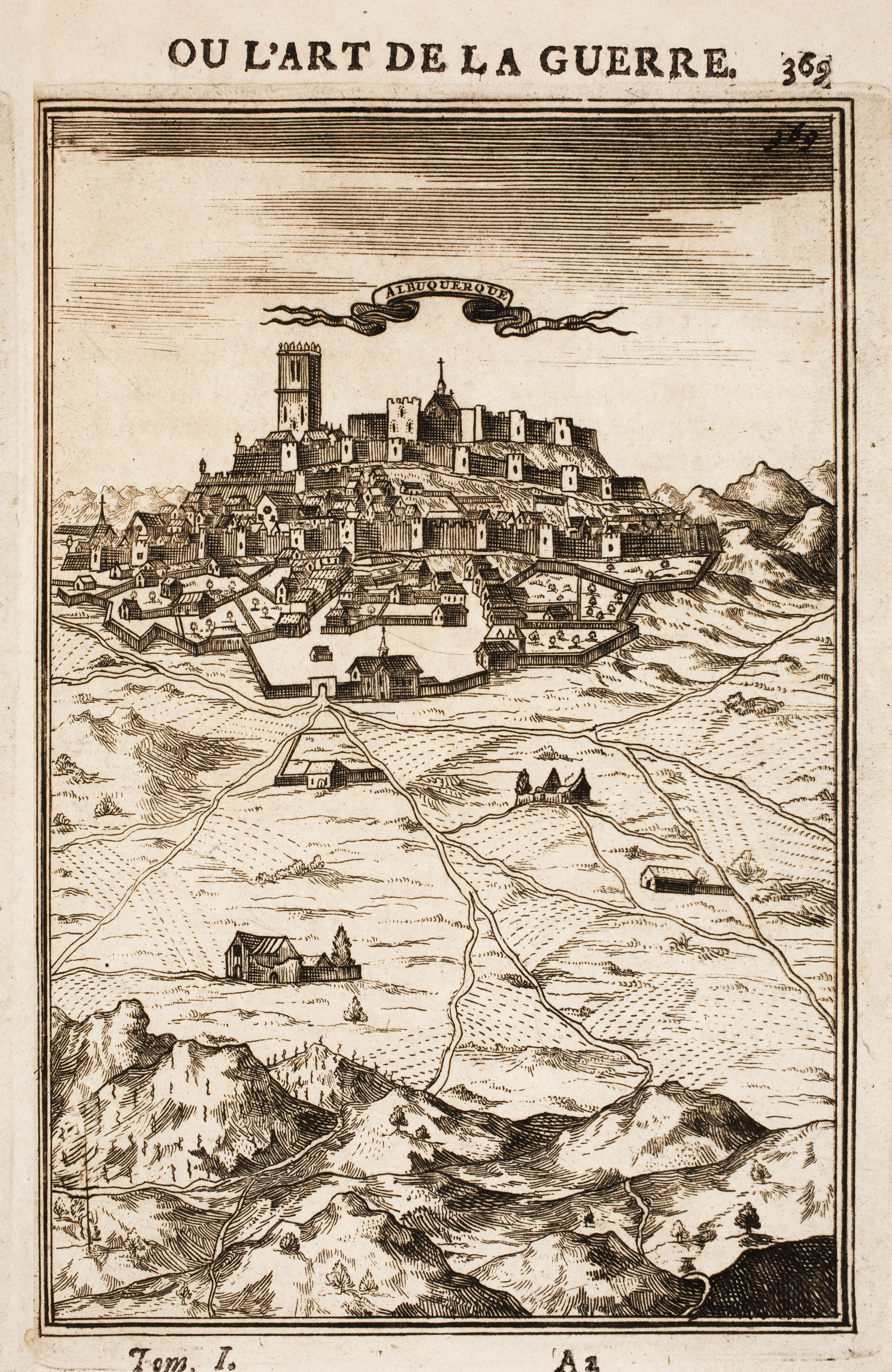
Page from Les Travaux de Mars ou l'Art de la Guerre showing the fortified town of Alburquerque.

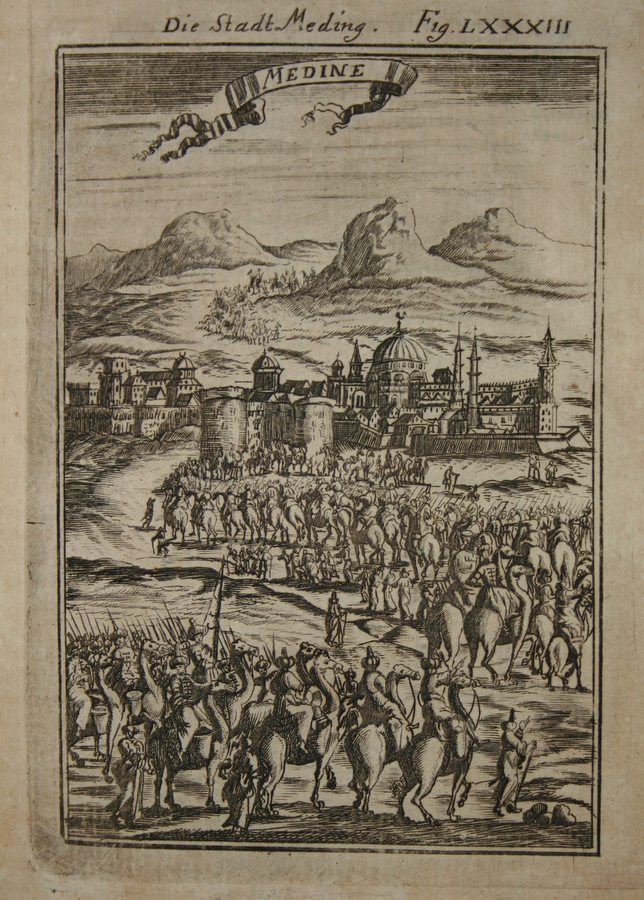
View of Medina.

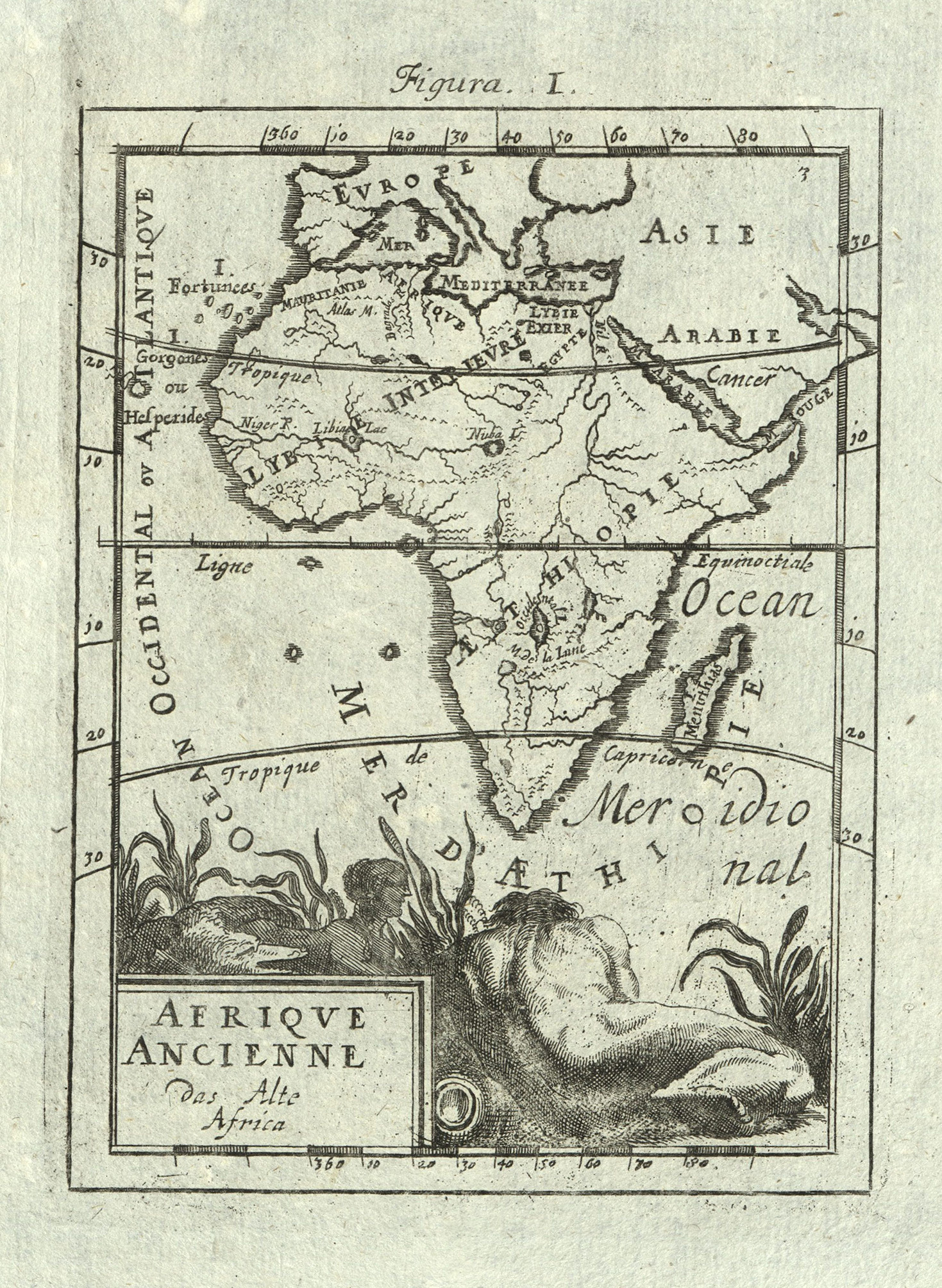
Afrique Ancienne, 1719

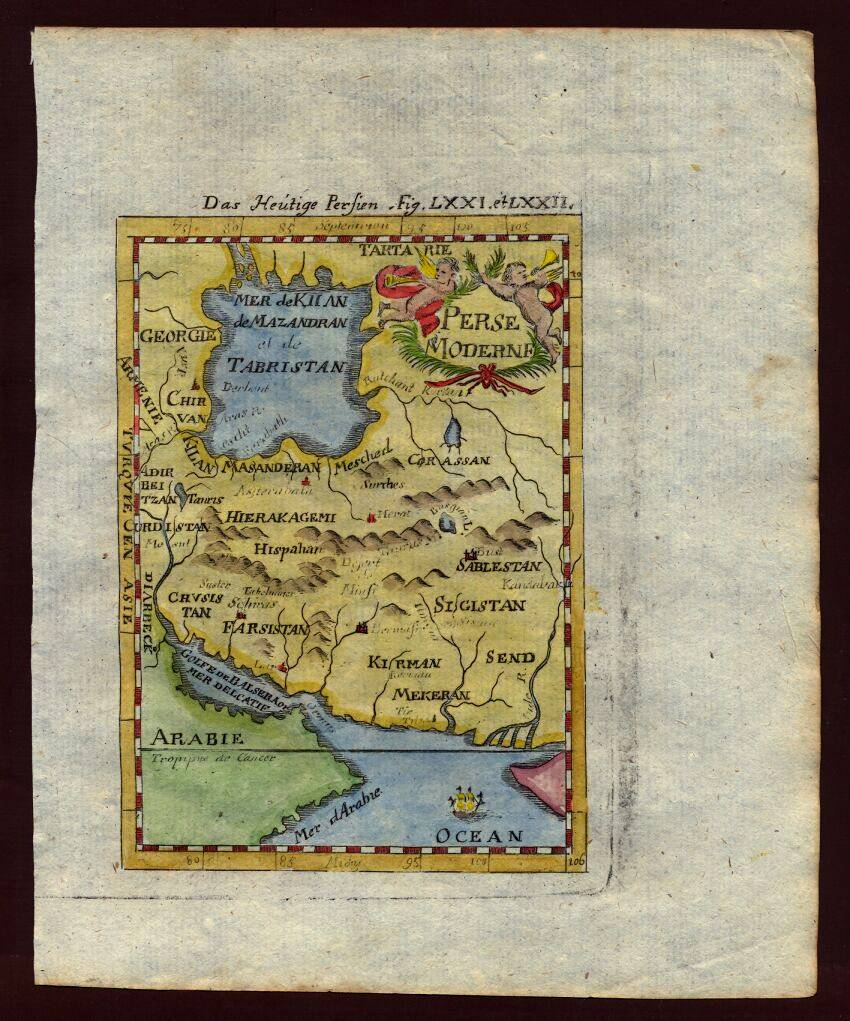
Map of Persia.

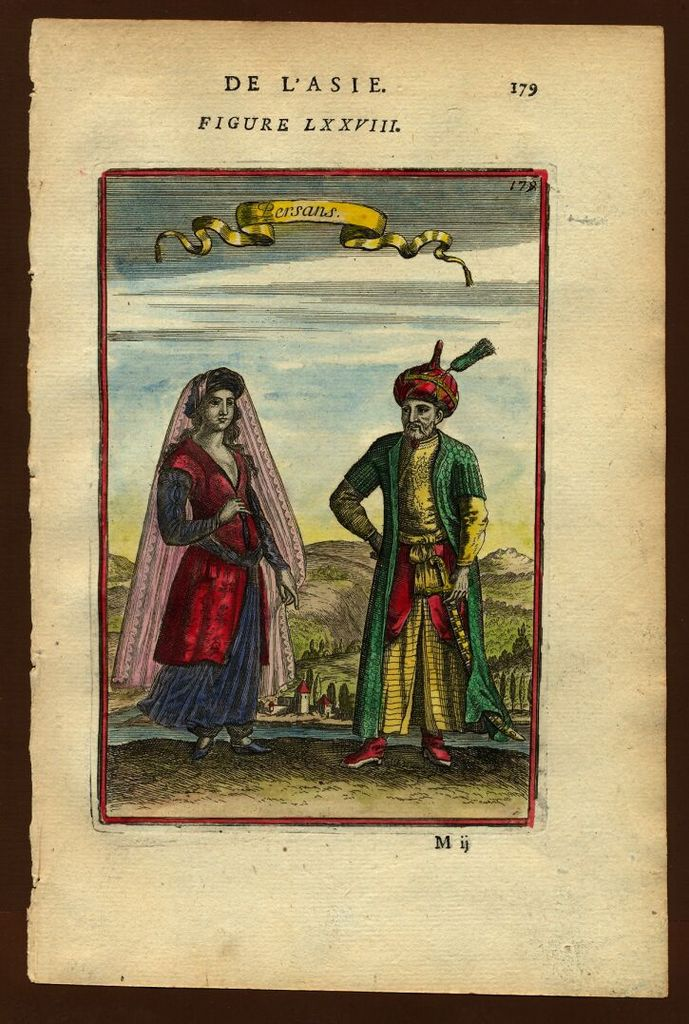
View of Persians.

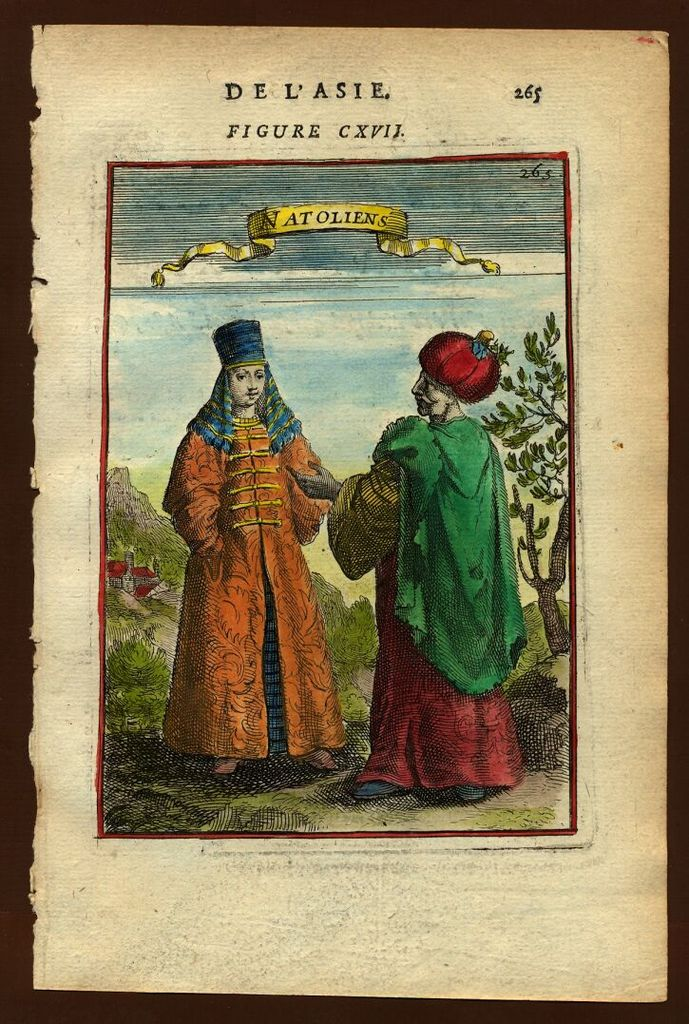
View of Anatolians.

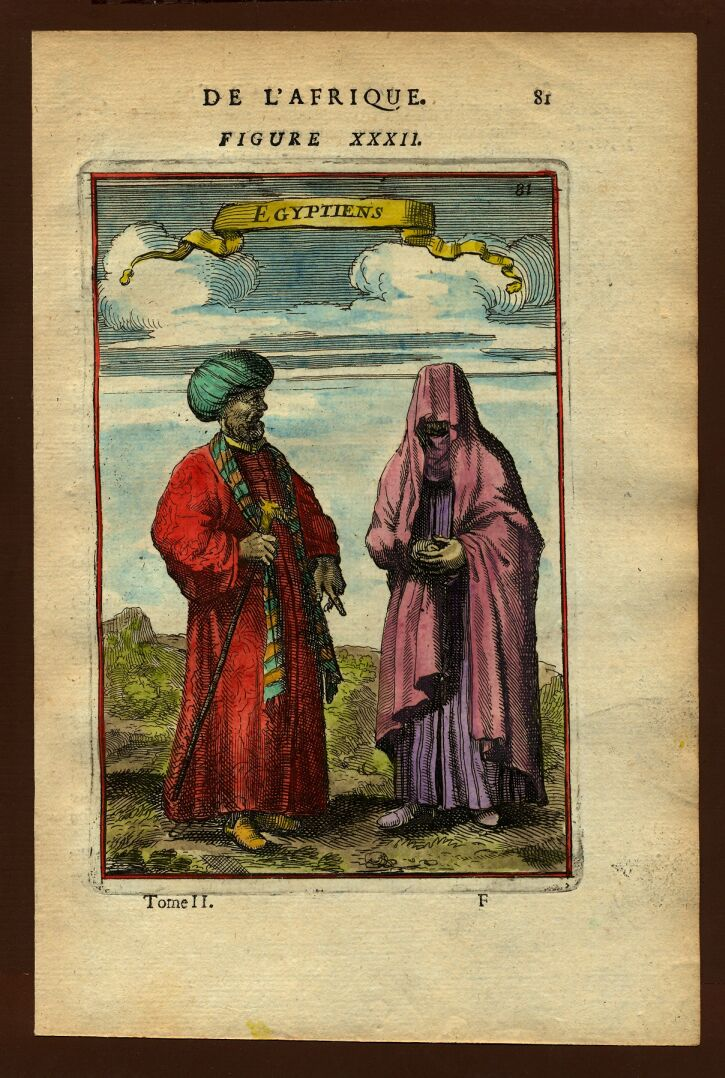
View of Egyptians.

Treatises on line: http://architectura.cesr.univ-tours.fr/Traite/Auteur/Manesson_Mallet.asp?param=en
