= The Armada =

The term "The Armada" may refer to:

- The Spanish Armada, fleet that attempted to invade England in 1588
- 2nd Spanish Armada; sent to England in 1596
- 3rd Spanish Armada; sent to England in 1597
- 4th Spanish Armada; sent to Ireland in 1601
- The Armada (band), Irish rock band fronted by Jeff Martin of The Tea Party
  - The Armada (album) by the band
- The Armada (book), about the Spanish fleet, by Garrett Mattingly
- The Armada (poem) by Thomas Babington Macaulay
