= Martín de Padilla y Manrique, 1st Count of Santa Gadea =

Spanish Admiral

Martín de Padilla
- Born: 1540; Calatañazor, Spain
- Died: 20 May 1602 (aged 61–62); El Puerto de Santa María, Spain
- Military career
- Allegiance: Spanish Empire
- Branch: Navy
- Service years: 1522-1540
- Rank: General
- Conflicts: Anglo-Spanish War (1585–1604); English Armada; Battle of the Gulf of Almería; 2nd Spanish Armada; Islands Voyage; 3rd Spanish Armada

Martín de Padilla y Manrique, 1st Count of Santa Gadea, Adelantado of Castile (Calatañazor, present-day Castile and León, 1540 – El Puerto de Santa María, 1602), secretary of state and war of Philip II of Spain, was a Spanish Admiral during the Anglo–Spanish War (1585–1604), French Wars of Religion and the Eighty Years' War. His most notable naval engagements included the Spanish Armada, battle with the Counter Armada and the Battle of the Gulf of Almería (1591). Padilla commanded a squadron of galleys that sank four cargo vessels from the English Armada off Lisbon in 1589.
