= Diego Brochero =

Diego Brochero (died 30 July 1625, Madrid) was a Spanish seaman originally from Salamanca.

He took part in the 2nd Spanish Armada and the 3rd Spanish Armada and the 4th Spanish Armada.

In 1601 he was an admiral in a Spanish force and oversaw fifteen ships. He was also sent to land troops in Ireland during the 4th Spanish Armada which ended in defeat in 1602.

== See also ==
- Siege of Kinsale

== Sources ==
- Fernández Duro, Cesáreo. La Armada Española desde la unión de los reinos de Castilla y Aragón, Museo Naval, Madrid, 1973.
