= Battle of the Gulf of Almería (1591) =

Naval battle during the Eighty Years' War

Coordinates: 36°50′25″N 2°28′05″W

- Part of the Eighty Years' War and the Anglo-Spanish War (1585–1604)
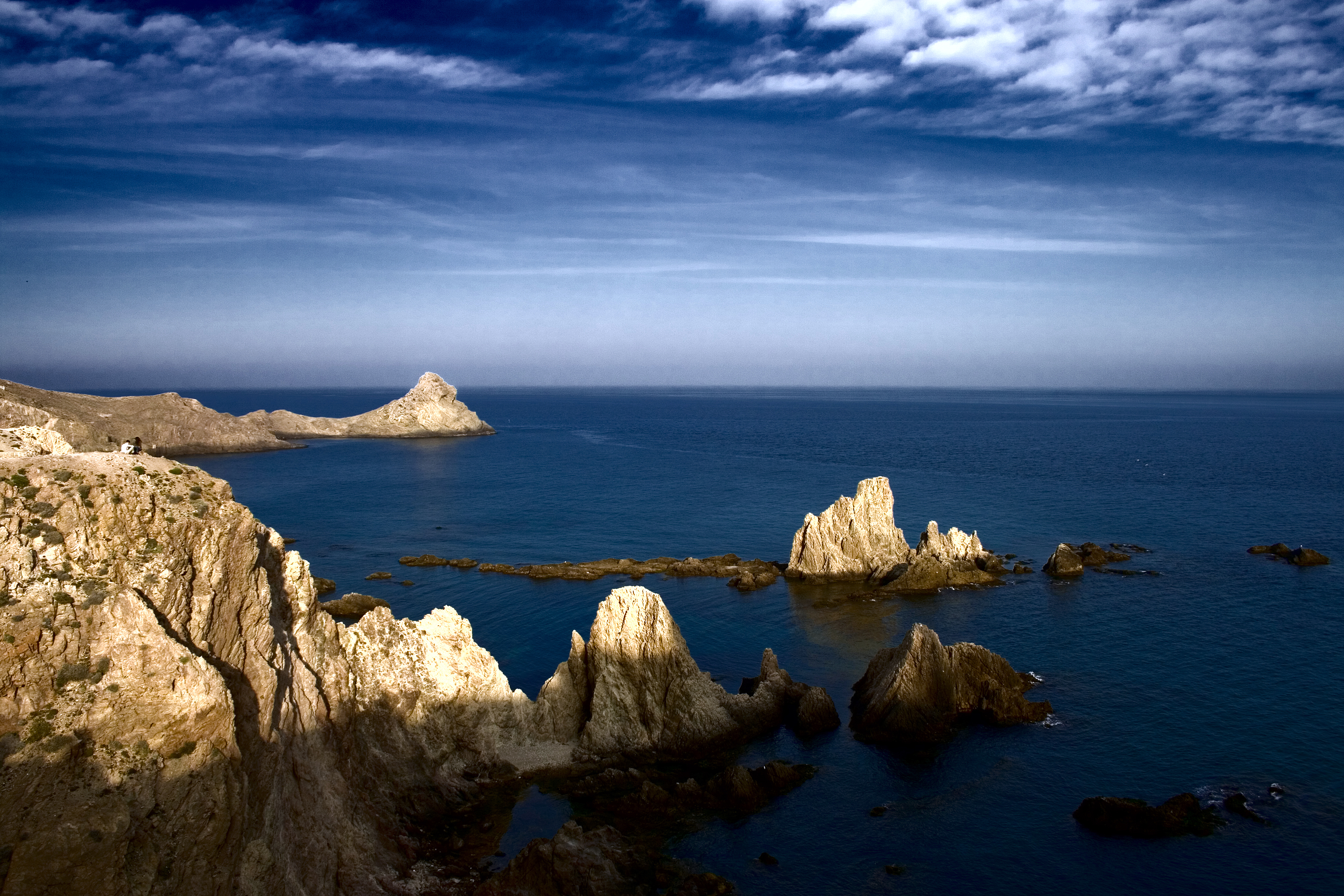
- Photography of the Gulf of Almería by Gabriel Villena.
Date	Late August, 1591
Location	Gulf of Almería, Mediterranean Sea
Result	Spanish victory

Belligerents
Dutch Republic; England	Spain

Commanders and leaders
Unknown	(Spain) Martín de Padilla

Strength
Unknown: around 35 ships	Unknown: around 20 ships

Casualties and losses
20 Dutch ships captured 3 English ships captured	None

The Battle of the Gulf of Almería, also known as the Battle of Almería Bay or the Battle of Cape of Palos, was a naval Spanish victory that took place in late August, 1591, off Almería, near the Cape Palos, during the Eighty Years' War and the Anglo-Spanish War (1585–1604). The battle occurred when the Spanish fleet of the Adelantado of Castile, Don Martín de Padilla y Manrique, Count of Santa Gadea (in their return from the Republic of Venice to Spain with a valuable goods), sighted an Anglo-Dutch fleet in the waters of Almería, on the southern coast of Spain. The Spanish fleet, led by Martín de Padilla, attacked with such fury the Anglo-Dutch fleet who managed to undo their training, achieved a great success. About 20 Dutch ships and 3 English ships were captured by the Spaniards, and some ships of the rest of the Anglo-Dutch fleet were seriously damaged. On the other hand, the Spanish losses were minimal.

After the battle, the Spanish fleet victorious, entered the port of Almeria with the captured ships.

== See also ==
- Cape Palos
- Siege of Deventer (1591)
- Battle of Flores (1591)
- Siege of Rouen (1591)
- Battle of the Bay of Biscay (1592)
- Battle of the Gulf of Cádiz
