= Dunasead Castle =

17th century fortified house in Baltimore, County Cork, Ireland

Coordinates: 51.4835°N 9.373°W

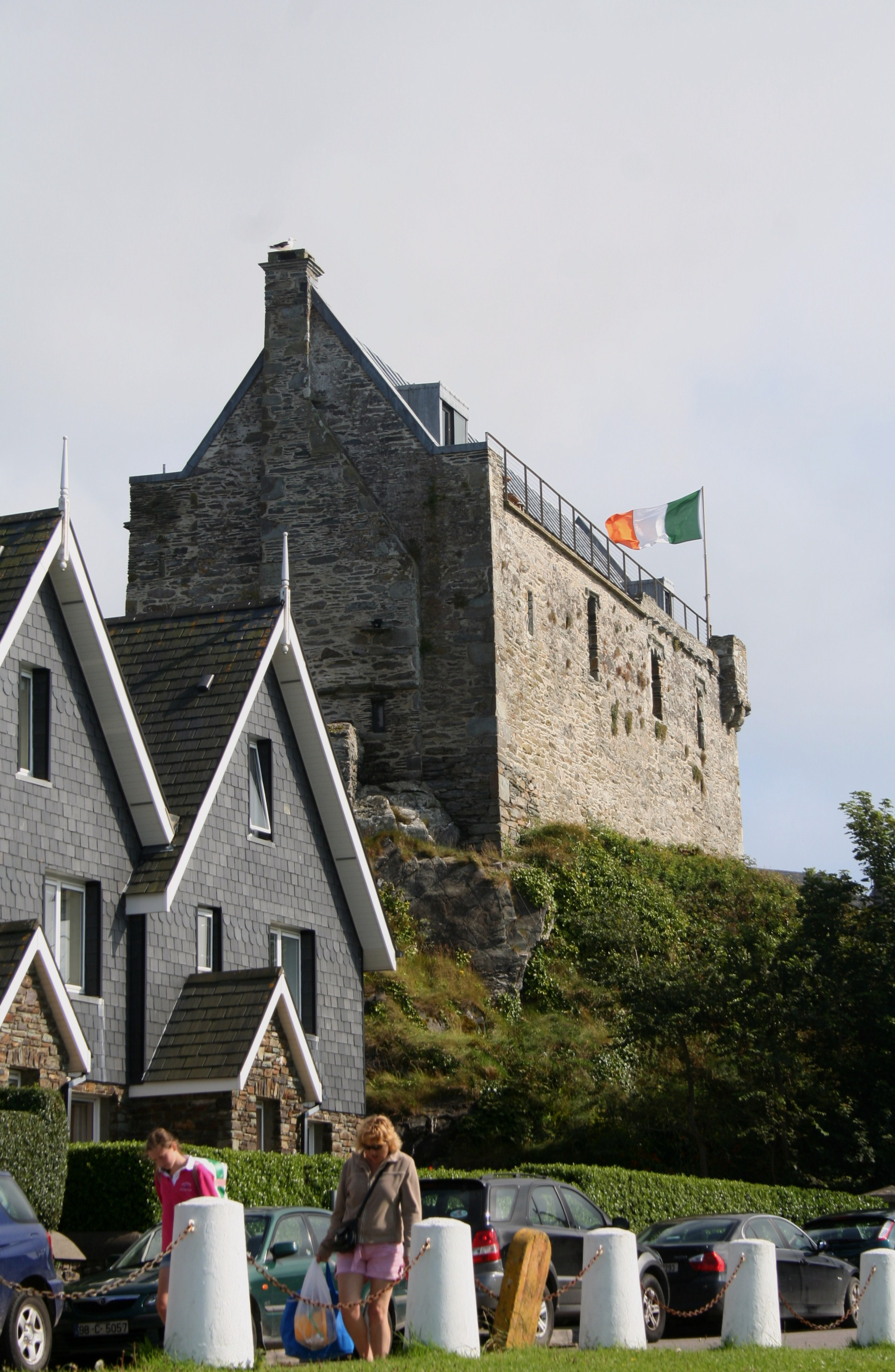
Dunasead Castle

Dunasead Castle (Irish: Dún na Séad, meaning 'fort of the jewels'), sometimes known as Baltimore Castle, is a 17th-century fortified house situated in the town of Baltimore in County Cork, Ireland. The tower house is built on the site of an earlier Norman-era structure, which itself replaced an earlier Bronze Age ringfort. Traditionally associated with the chiefs of clan O'Driscoll, the castle was purchased and restored by members of the McCarthy family in the late 1990s, and partially opened to the public from 2005.

== History ==
The present castle is not the first to have been built on the site. In 1215, an Anglo-Norman settler, FitzStephens, built a tower house with a bawn there, which itself replaced a much older fortification, probably a ringfort. In 1305, the castle was attacked and burned down by one of the most powerful Gaelic septs in the region, the MacCarthys. Another Gaelic sept, the O'Driscolls, much smaller but still powerful in the region, subsequently took possession of Dunasead and rebuilt it.

The O'Driscolls were constantly under pressure from encroachments by Anglo-Norman settlers and rival Gaelic clans on their territory and trade interests, which resulted in the castle being attacked and destroyed numerous times in the following centuries. One especially long-running feud erupted between the O'Driscolls and the merchants of Waterford City in 1368, following an attack on the Waterford fleet by the O'Driscolls. During this feud, in December 1413, the then mayor of Waterford reputedly captured members of the O'Driscoll family and took them to Waterford. This feud continued on and off for almost two centuries, ending in the sacking of Dunasead, Baltimore and other O'Driscoll castles by another Waterford fleet in 1537.

The castle was rebuilt, and during the 4th Spanish Armada of 1601 the castle was occupied by Spanish troops but, following the O'Driscolls' support for Hugh O'Neill at the Battle of Kinsale, the castle was surrendered to the English army. Some of the O'Driscolls received pardons, and Dunasead was returned to Florence O'Driscoll, who subsequently leased it out, along with most of his lands, due to financial problems. The present castle was probably built in the 1620s and was surrendered to Oliver Cromwell's forces in the 1640s.

The castle later fell into ruins, but was renovated between 1997 and 2005 and is now in use as a private residence.

== Architecture ==
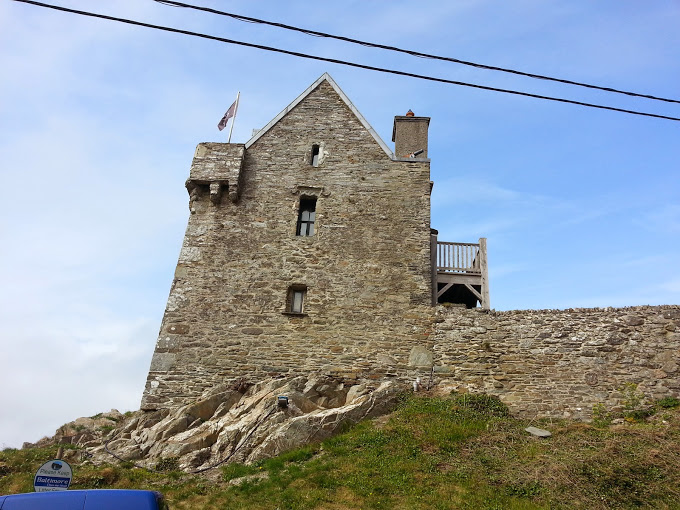
Dunasead is built on a sandstone ridge

Dunasead is built on a ridge of sandstone in the heart of Baltimore, overlooking the harbour. It consists of a two-storey rectangular building (with an additional attic space) surrounded by a bawn or curtain wall. The main building is set into the south-west wall of the bawn, and measures approximately 6 by 18 metres (20 by 59 ft). This building's defensive features are meagre compared to those of the earlier tower houses in the region; on the ground floor, the windows are narrow slits, and there is a bartizan on the south-west corner.

== See also ==
- Corcu Loígde
- List of castles in Ireland
- List of coastal fortifications of County Cork
