= Invisible armada =

1599 panic in England

The "invisible armada" is the name given to the 1599 panic in England over the supposed approach of a Spanish Armada – an alarm greater than that experienced during the real crisis of 1588. Francis Bacon records that afterwards people “forbore not from scoffs, saying that in the year ’88 Spain had sent an Invincible Armada against us and now she had sent an Invisible Armada”.

== Background ==
Spanish naval strength had quickly recovered from the defeat of 1588, and two more Armadas had been sent against England in 1596 and 1597, only to be dispelled by gales each time. After the Peace of Vervins between France and Spain in 1598, the latter was free to concentrate her efforts against the English and the Dutch; and by the summer of 1599 reports of a new fleet gathering in Andalusia began to reach England.

== Mobilisation and outcome ==
With experienced troops absent in Ireland and the Low Countries, an intense mobilisation of trained and untrained men took place over the summer, with up to 25,000 men concentrated around London. Blocking the Thames as a defence against another Spanish Fury was also proposed, and it was not till September that the alarm and the mobilisation was allowed to wind down.

While the Spanish fleet had indeed been a reality, it had in fact been aimed at Dutch naval forces, not England; and, caught by winds, it ended up in the Azores.

== See also ==
- A Larum for London
- Anglo-Spanish War (1585–1604)
- Robert Devereux, 2nd Earl of Essex
- Simon Forman
