= Fourth Spanish Armada =

1601-2 event in the Anglo-Spanish war

- Part of the Anglo-Spanish War and Nine Years' War
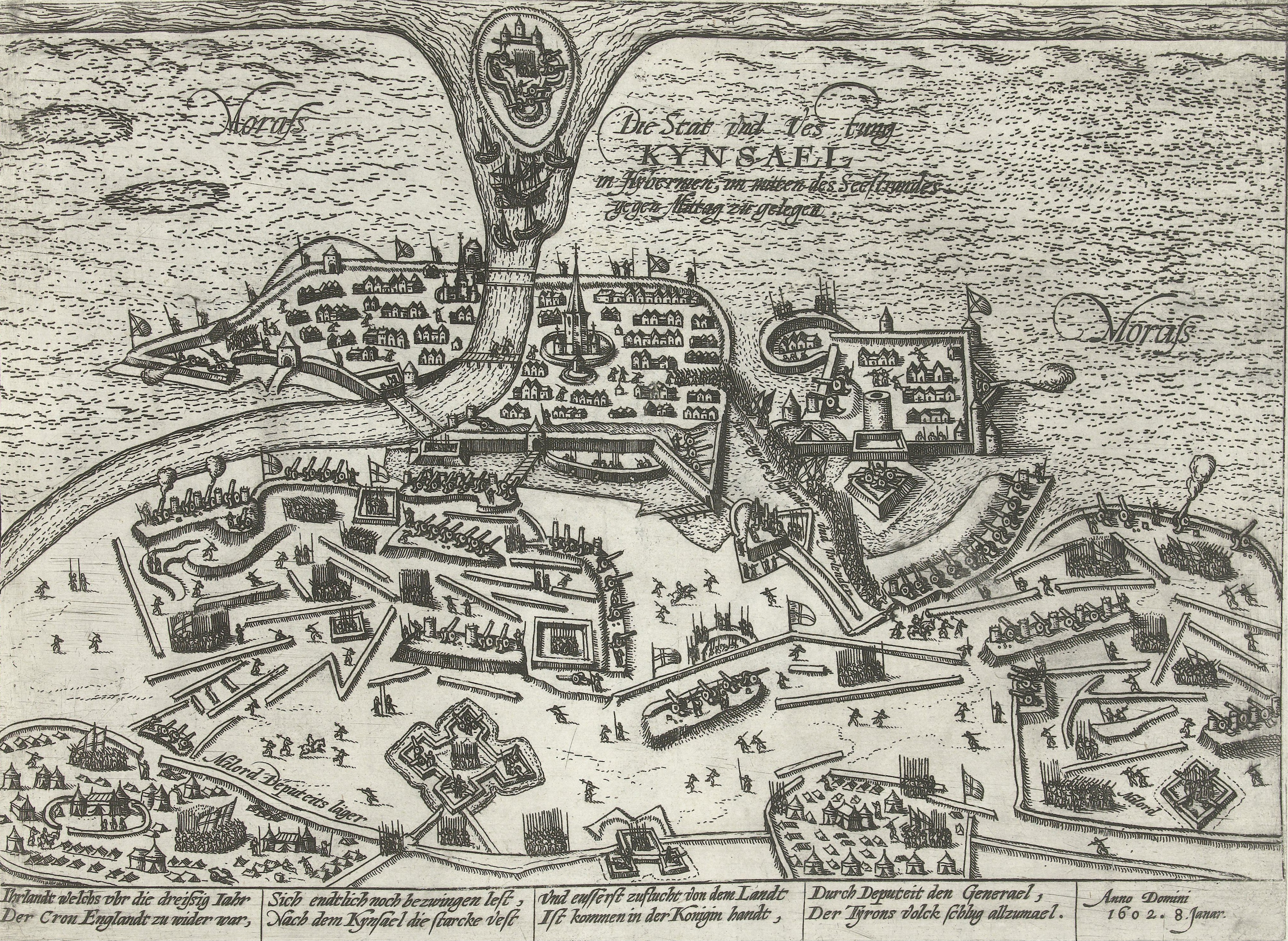
- Map of the Siege of Kinsale by Abraham Hogenberg
| Date | August 1601 – 13 March 1602 |
| Location | southwestern Kingdom of Ireland |
| Result | English victory |

Belligerents
| Spanish Empire; Irish rebel forces | Kingdom of England: Kingdom of Ireland |

Commanders and leaders
| (Spain) Philip III; Diego Brochero; Juan del Águila (surrendered); Alonso de Ocampo (surrendered); Pedro López de Soto; Pedro de Zubiaur; Hugh O'Neill; Hugh Roe O'Donnell | (England) Elizabeth I Charles Blount; George Carew; Richard Leveson; Amyas Preston; Donogh O'Brien |

Strength
| Irish rebel forces: 7,600; Spaniards: 4,432 soldiers 36 warships 2,000 sailors | 12,000 soldiers and sailors 6 galleons 6 armed merchantman |

Casualties and losses
| Spain: 1,500 killed, wounded, sick to disease; 3,700 surrendered; 8 ships captured, sunk or scuttled; Irish rebel forces: 1,200 killed (many executed) | ~200 killed or wounded 6,000 deserted, sick or dead to disease |

The Fourth Spanish Armada, also known as the Last Armada, was a military expedition sent to Ireland that took place between August 1601 and March 1602 towards the end of Anglo-Spanish war. The armada, the fourth and smallest of its type, was sent on orders from the Spanish king Philip III to southwestern Ireland to assist the Irish rebels led by Hugh O'Neill, Earl of Tyrone, who were fighting to rid Ireland of Queen Elizabeth I of England's rule. Don Juan del Águila and Don Diego Brochero commanded the expedition that consisted of 36 ships and 4,500 soldiers, and a significant amount of arms and ammunition. The Spanish were also planning to establish a base at Cork from which to strike at England.

Bad weather separated the ships and some had to turn back but the remaining 1,800 men under Águila disembarked at Kinsale on 22 September. Further reinforcements the following month brought the total to 3,500. Admiral Pedro de Zubiaur landed another 700 men in early December at Castlehaven, and sent part of that force commanded by Alonso de Ocampo to Baltimore occupying the castles in the area, Dunboy, Dunasead and Dúnalong (Sherkin Island). The English led by Charles Blount, the Earl of Mountjoy and George Carew, responded in force and were able to besiege Kinsale on 2 October. A small fleet led by Richard Leveson were able to blockade the Spanish at Kinsale by late November. The Irish under Tyrone and clan chief Hugh Roe O'Donnell made their way to Kinsale in a 300-mile march and were joined with 200 Spanish under Alonso de Ocampo.

Leveson went out to Castlehaven and defeated Zubiaur's small fleet, leaving the Spanish stranded there, and unable to help Águila. On 24 December, the Irish arrived at Kinsale, and a pitched battle during a storm was fought. Águila was however unable to intervene, and the English defeated Tyrone's forces. The English resumed the siege and Águila was forced to seek terms, and surrendered Kinsale in January 1602. The other garrisons at Dunboy, Castlehaven, Dunasead and Dúnalong also surrendered as part of the terms. This resulted in bitter recriminations in Spain, especially for Águila. This was to be the last Spanish armada sent, and the last major campaign against the British Isles during the war. The defeat thus weakened Spanish resolve in the war against England which subsequently led to peace negotiations that terminated with the Treaty of London in 1604.

== Background ==
In 1595, Gaelic lord Hugh O'Neill, Earl of Tyrone joined his confederates in open rebellion against the English crown in Ireland. A conflict had been brewing as a result of the advance of the English state in Ireland, from control over the Pale to ruling the whole island. In resisting this advance, Tyrone managed to rally other Irish septs notably Florence MacCarthy who were dissatisfied with the English government, and some Catholics such as Owen McEgan who opposed the spread of Protestantism in Ireland. Queen Elizabeth I had sent in crown forces to restore order, but were struggling to take back control. Many of the clans also sought help from Catholic Spain.

Ireland had featured in Spanish plans to invade England in 1588 when the Spanish Armada was forced to make landfall there, following a perilous route home through heavy storms after its defeat in the English Channel. The concept of using Ireland as 'the King of Spain's bridge into England' had been proposed during the war. A prophecy predicted that 'he that England will win, through Ireland must come in'. Irish expatriates, Owen McEgan and James Archer and Spanish clericals such as Franciscan Mateo de Oviedo had convinced King Philip II of Spain that he had a realistic chance of ousting the English from their first colony. Oviedo had made several trips there and had forged close contacts with the insurgent leaders.

Philip eventually offered aid to the Irish rebels in the expectation that tying the English down in Ireland might draw English resources away from the Low Countries. English troops were fighting with their Protestant ally the Dutch Estates who had been engaged in a long rebellion against Spanish rule. Philip thus sent the Second Spanish Armada aimed at supporting the Irish rebels, but this was a costly failure - the fleet was driven off course by storms off Cape Finisterre in October 1596 with many ships sunk. Undeterred, the ill and dying Philip sent the Third Spanish Armada the following year, but storms and ill planning drove many ships back to Spain, with the English fleet picking off the remnants.

=== Spanish plan ===
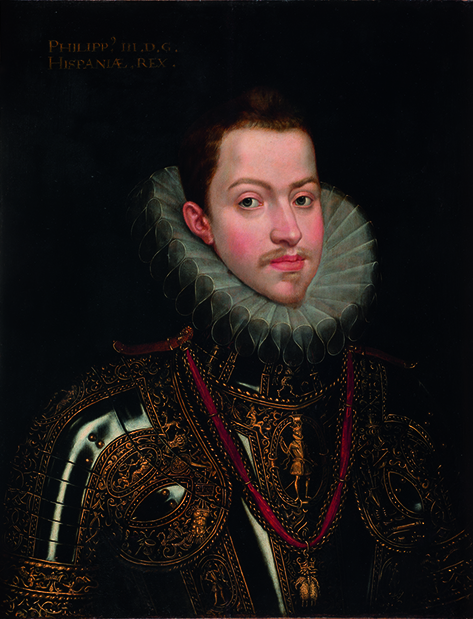
The new King of Spain - Philip III

After the Peace of Vervins which ended the war between France and Spain in 1598, the latter was free to concentrate her efforts against the English and the Dutch. The Spanish did however lose its strategic coastal bastions along the French coast, and with it any potential for a quick strike against England. Spain looked for an ideal replacement, with one such being Ireland that could also be used as a coastal base for privateers, like the Dunkirkers, to disrupt English and Dutch shipping.

In August 1598, Irish rebels had defeated the English at the Yellow Ford in Armagh, which buoyed Spanish overtures to the Irish. After Philip II's death that year the new King Philip III continued to provide direct support to the Irish rebels, but in a less demanding manner. The Spanish court was now dominated by the Duke of Lerma whose general policy was one of disengagement. There were peace talks at the Boulogne conference in 1600, but this failed, and Spain was looking for a decisive knockout blow against both Holland and England. The following year, Spanish forces mounted a huge effort to take the Anglo-Dutch held port of Ostend on the Flanders coast, and an expedition to Ireland was organised.

Despite the failure of the two armadas and bankruptcy in 1596, Spain built up its fleet so that by the end of 1600 it had assembled 35 galleons, 70 other ships and 25,000 men. Philip ordered Don Juan del Águila and Don Diego Brochero to go to Ireland with 6,000 men in an armada with a significant amount of arms and ammunition. Águila was a hardened veteran that had made his reputation under the Duke of Parma, had served in the Brittany campaign and had been part of successful expedition to Cornwall in 1595 under Captain Carlos de Amésquita. He had been imprisoned for not paying taxes to the King, but proved his innocence and in reparation, he was given the command of the expedition. The aim was to take Cork, a key southern port of the island and hold it for a larger Spanish landing later on.

At Belém, 4,432 troops were mustered into 45 companies and grouped into two tercios (regiments). The number of fighting men was far short of the 6,000 men (two normal-sized tercios) that Tyrone had requested, and Philip had intended to send.

=== English plans ===
By the summer of 1599 reports of a new fleet gathering in Andalusia began to reach England. A Spanish fleet attempting to enter the Channel against the Dutch failed due to high winds but the sighting and reports caused panic in London and intense mobilisation of trained and untrained men went underway. Furthermore, a Dutch fleet returning from a failed attack on A Coruña also entered the channel, which put more fuel to rumours of another Spanish attempt. It was only in September that this alarm wound down, but England still sent out fleets of various sizes to counter any potential Spanish attempts.

By early 1601, the war in Ireland had changed - the new English commander Charles Blount along with George Carew, the Lord President of Munster had suppressed parts of the rebellion by using a scorched Earth policy in Tyrone's lands. One of the Spanish contacts in Ireland Florence McCarthy was taken prisoner and sent to the Tower. Tyrone and O'Donnell were forced to conduct a guerrilla style warfare.

By April 1601, the English Privy Council imagined that the chances of a Spanish intervention were slight. By June however, intelligence confirmed that between 4,000 and 5,000 men had mustered at Lisbon and ready for Ireland. Vigorous preparations were made by the Privy Council to meet this expected invasion. By the beginning of September the promise of 2,000 men had arrived in Ireland and more were being levied.

== Execution ==
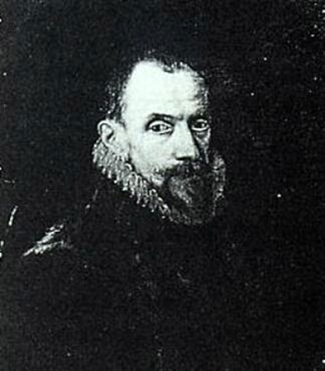
Spanish commander Juan del Aguila y Arellano

The Spanish fleet was supposed to set sail in late August 1601, but only got a head wind on September 2. Finally setting out from Lisbon, they sailed towards Ireland - the delay meant that conditions on Spanish ships were poor and many soldiers and sailors were on half rations. Nevertheless, the fleet made good progress, passing the Groyne and safely negotiating the Bay of Biscay's notoriously dangerous waters.

As the armada approached island of Ouessant, Admiral Brochero raised the question of the destination, which was still under debate. A summit council was held on board the San Andres - Brochero warned of a coming storm and became frustrated with Águila. In his report which he made for his own defence, he wrote, Thirty leagues off the Irish coast, I told Águila to identify his chosen port, because I was merely in charge of the fleet. There were indecisions and intense arguments by the commanders about where to land, partly to fool any English spies. Águila preferred either Donegal Bay or some east-coast port facing England. Brochero, who had been against the armada being sent, vetoed the East for ease of reinforcements. The priests including Oviedo, wanted to land and take Munster, one of the English Pales. The south was more convenient for Brochero's ships. Eventually a consensus was unsatisfactorily reached - Brochero issued written orders to each naval captain to follow him to Kinsale and named the port of Castlehaven, southeast of Skibbereen and some 70 km west of Kinsale, as a secondary objective.

=== Storms ===
Soon after the agreement, a strong gale dispersed the fleet. This soon turned into a storm, which scattered the individual ships across the ocean surface. Águila and Brochero, in the San Andres, managed to battle the winds northeast towards the Cork-Kinsale region, accompanied by the bulk of the fleet and carrying some 1,700 men.

Meanwhile, Vice-Admiral Zubiaur became hopelessly lost with his galleon, San Felipe and three other ships. They were carrying nearly seven hundred of the best troops, as well as most of the stores and munitions. Zubiaur made several attempts to join his comrades, but all failed due to poor winds, and a final attempt to end up at Donegal failed. Some were swept out into the Atlantic - a large transport carrying ammunition and supplies was later captured by an English privateer after being in considerable distress.

After the storm had dissipated, Brochero managed to reach Southern Ireland in relatively good weather on 18 September followed by the greater part of the vessels. He attempted to get into Cork harbour, but the wind changed making an attempt up the river impossible. By this time Zubiaur had been forced to sail back towards Spain, arriving at the port of Ferrol. News of his return angered the Spanish council and later the King, and he was ordered to put to sale as soon as he could, but again any head wind was lacking.

=== Landfall – Kinsale ===
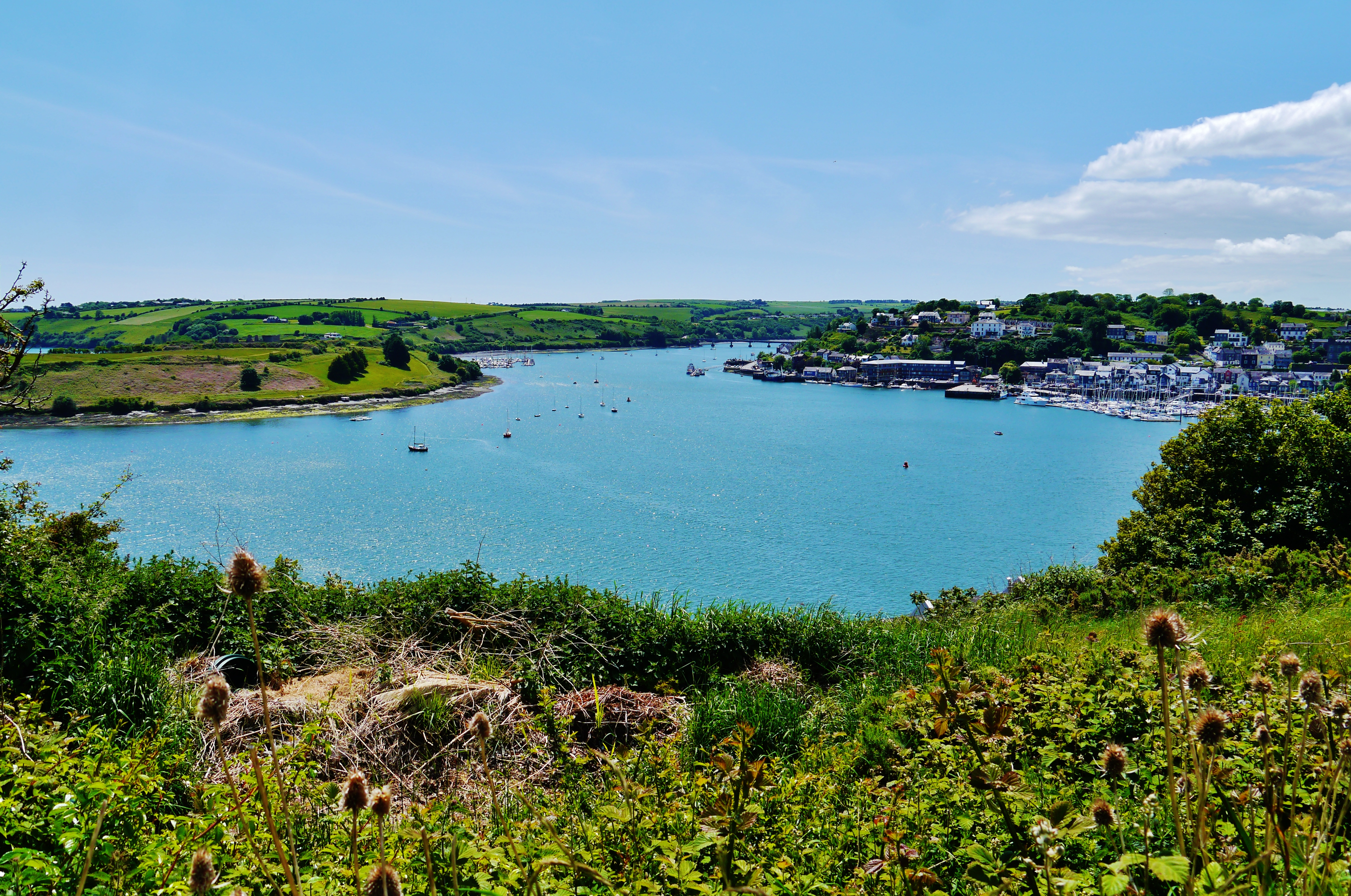
Present view of Kinsale harbour and town

On 19 September, Brochero's ships arrived in Kinsale harbour. As soon as the troops and provisions had landed, his fleet sailed off after eight days in the port. Only a few of the Spanish merchant ships remained in the harbour. The two squadrons of Spanish troops began to march – some 1,700 of them to Kinsale itself. On Tuesday, 22 September, the town was captured having been only defended by some 900 poorly armed Irish militia. Águila granted safe conduct to the two town officials, Oviedo who had accompanied him, wrote a letter to Tyrone and O'Donnell to make haste, particularly with much needed cavalry. When the news reached the Tyrone, he realised he would have to make a 300-mile march to relieve them. The Spanish were also looking for Florence McCarthy not knowing that he had been arrested by Carew. His absence meant that for the Spanish, organising local support was severely hampered.

Águila now waited for reinforcements - Brochero arrived with several ships bringing reinforcements before sailing off again. Their arrival doubled Águila's force to around 3,400, and brought him a few more guns. Two-thirds of his troops were Spanish regulars – Venetian observers described these as 'a picked body of infantry', accompanied by some 1,000 Italian soldiers and around 200 Irish expatriates. Many were toughened veterans whose fighting ability was well respected by the English. Águila stayed with them now isolated in Kinsale, and decided to fortify the camp and wait for Zubiaur's reinforcements. At the entrance of the bay, he ordered the construction of two forts: Castle Park and Ringcurran. To command some extent land outside the town an outpost called 'Camphill' was also constructed.

On 22 September, reports of the Spanish landing soon reached the Lord Deputy, Charles Blount where he was at Kilkenny. Mountjoy's response was rapid and decisive; he quickly gathered some 6,000 men, horse and several cannons. After gathering enough supplies he advanced to Cork where he was expecting the Spanish. When newsletters of the Spanish landing arrived at court in London – Elizabeth's fears of a Spanish invasion was thus confirmed. There were then rumours circulating that she had solicited assistance from King James IV of Scotland, who was willing to send assistance, but only after Elizabeth had recognised his right of succession.

=== Kinsale besieged ===
A week later, the Anglo-Irish force arrived on the outskirts of Kinsale. Having reconnoitered the town for a few days it was not until 2 October that Mountjoy began to lay siege to the area, but he needed more men to surround the area. Reinforcements were brought in through Oysterhaven, bringing the army's numbers up to 12,000. This included a large force under Irish nobleman Donogh O'Brien, 4th Earl of Thomond. However, the vast majority were Irish levies, and many were not suited to siege warfare, especially in winter. Meanwhile, further North, English and Irish cavalry led by Carew were searching for O'Neill and O'Donnell. Both evaded him, but Carew's forces raided castles and farms in the surrounding region in order to remove the advantage the Spanish had expected upon their landing.

On 23 October, Tyrone and O'Donnell finally began marching to help the Spanish, the two forces rendezvoused and encamped at Kinalmeaky to rest and provision the army and to wait for the arrival of additional forces from Leinster and Munster. Tyrone had 2,500 foot and 500 horse, and O'Donnell with 1500 foot and 300 horse. They then marched south again in worsening weather, but in doing so successfully cut English supply lines across the island. Both sides called for allegiance from the population.

Mountjoy sent letters to Admiral Richard Leveson who was in Dublin to set sail with his small fleet and form a tight blockade around Kinsale. The latter sailed with six ships; the powerful Warspite, Garland (commanded by Vice Admiral Amyas Preston), Defiance, Swiftsure, and Merlin, Non-Pareil and six requisitioned merchantmen carrying some 2,000 troops. These arrived at Cork on 27 September, but southerly winds delayed their departure from there.

Cartographic map showing the blockade of Kinsale by the English navy

At time of the Spanish landing, there were only two English ships on the Irish station to give assistance to Mountjoy. They arrived after the Spanish shipping had left. They were Tremontana under Captain Charles Plessington and Moon under Captain Thomas Button.

At the end of October, a number of cannon was sent by Mountjoy to bombard Ringcurran fort. The guns from the English siege works pounded the small fort. Don Pedro de Heredia the Spanish commander turned down a request for the surrender. The bombardment resumed and this time with the guns of Captain Button's Moon, a breach had opened. The small number of Irish soldiers fled, fearing for their lives – Heredia decided it was best too, with some fifty Spaniards. An English patrol however spotted them, most surrendered – very few escaped. In the meantime a Spanish force from Kinsale itself attempted to relieve the garrison. Lieutenant-colonel Colonel Francis Roe, with a hundred men, became heavily engaged in skirmishes with a force twice his number. Roe's commanding officer Sir Oliver St John seeing that Spanish pikemen were preparing to charge, personally led thirty musketmen to reinforce Roe, and the Spanish were driven into retreat. Ringcurran fell soon after - Captain Paez de Clavijo with 86 Spanish prisoners agreed to surrender, leaving the besieged without any access to the sea. The prisoners were sent to Cork - Águila was angered at Heredia's 'cowardice'.

Carew had reached the English camp by the 15 November with 1,000 men and 250 horse. Two days later, Castle Ny-Parke which guarded the harbour entrance was the next English target. An assault using a wooden siege engine failed when it collapsed before the fort, and the English retreated. Águila attempted to relieve the fort but a small force of Spaniards in boats were repelled by English naval gunfire. Two days later it was taken in an assault by English troops led by Sir Richard Smyth after a breach had been made in the defences. All 33 men were either killed, wounded or captured. As a result, 'Camphill' was now exposed and Águila ordered its abandonment - the men withdrew into the castle's walls at night. With this higher ground seized, the English guns were able to subject Spanish forces to constant fire.

Leveson meanwhile had to wait a further week before he got under way. They did not arrive until 12 November; the English ships then formed a tight blockade of Kinsale harbour. Mountjoy however was not very impressed by what he saw, protesting that only one in ten of the troops could shoot a gun.

=== Landfall – Castlehaven and Baltimore ===
On 6 December, Zubiaur finally set out once again with ten ships from A Coruña, and around 1,000 men commanded by veteran Captain Alonso de Ocampo. Accompanying them was the quartermaster general Secretary of the Adelantado Pedro Lopez de Soto who had vital food, ammunition and supplies for Águila's men. The journey went well, but before they got to the Irish coast four ships were driven back by strong Northerly winds. One transport, a requisitioned Scottish vessel the Unicorn managed to get near Kinsale where she was sighted by Leveson's blockading ships. Preston's Garland subsequently boarded and captured her, with 80 Spaniards surrendering. The other three were unable to make landfall and were forced to head back to Spain. The remaining six now with only 621 men managed to evade the English Navy and eventually landed near Castlehaven on 11 December.

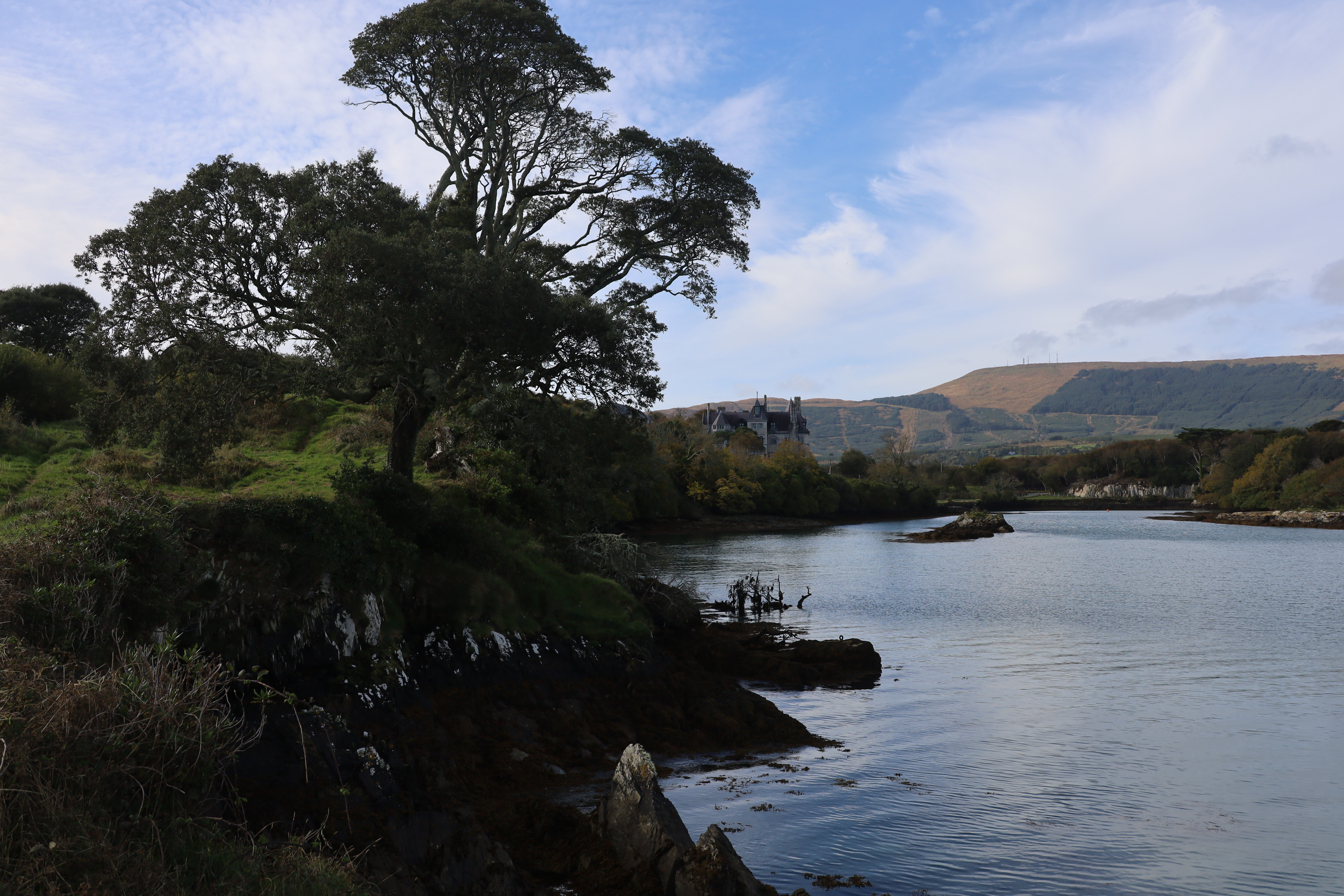
A present-day view of Dunboy Castle - 80 Spanish soldiers occupied the place in December 1601.

The Spanish arrival brought a general rally of the Irish lords - Donal Cam O'Sullivan Beare and Sir Fineen O'Driscoll (who had been knighted by Elizabeth I) welcomed the Spanish, and took oaths of homage to King Philip. Zubiaur signed a treaty with the Irish Lords whereby the castles were handed over to the Spanish in the name of the king. Glen Barrahane castle was handed over to Zubiaur who garrisoned it with over 100 men and strengthened its defences placing a number of cannon inside. The six ships meanwhile were moored in the shallows of Castlehaven.

Zubiaur identified Baltimore harbour as being a highly suitable place for a bigger Spanish landing later, and in due to its sheer remoteness. Alonso de Ocampo thus set out with 200 soldiers and occupied the castles around the area - Dunboy Castle near Berehaven was garrisoned with some sixty Spanish troops under Captain Saavedra along with eight guns of various calibres. Donnelong castle on Sherkin Island was occupied by Captain Andres de Arbe with 80 men and nine guns. A smaller number was sent to Dunasead Castle on the mainland near Baltimore. Like Glen Barrahane all of the castles defences were modernised, being armed with cannon and strengthened. Zubiaur armed O'Sullivans and O'Driscolls men with all the arms he had spare - some 650 pikes and 350 Arquebuses. Lopez de Soto protested at this, but fell on deaf ears. Ocampo meanwhile was sent to join Tyrone's army overland with 200 of his best men.

Two days later Mountjoy was informed that seven Spanish ships had entered the harbour of Castlehaven. Leveson, was ordered by Mountjoy to "seeke the Spanish fleete at Castlehaven, to take them if he could, or otherwise to distresse them as much as he might." Leveson then left his vice-admiral Preston in Garland to guard Kinsale harbour and took with him, Warspite, Defiance, Swiftsure, and Merlin, as well as a merchantman and a caravel to Castlehaven.

The following day, the wind was blowing inland, thereby preventing the English ships from leaving. Leveson had his vessels towed out of Kinsale harbour, and he then set off for Castlehaven.

=== Battle of Castlehaven ===
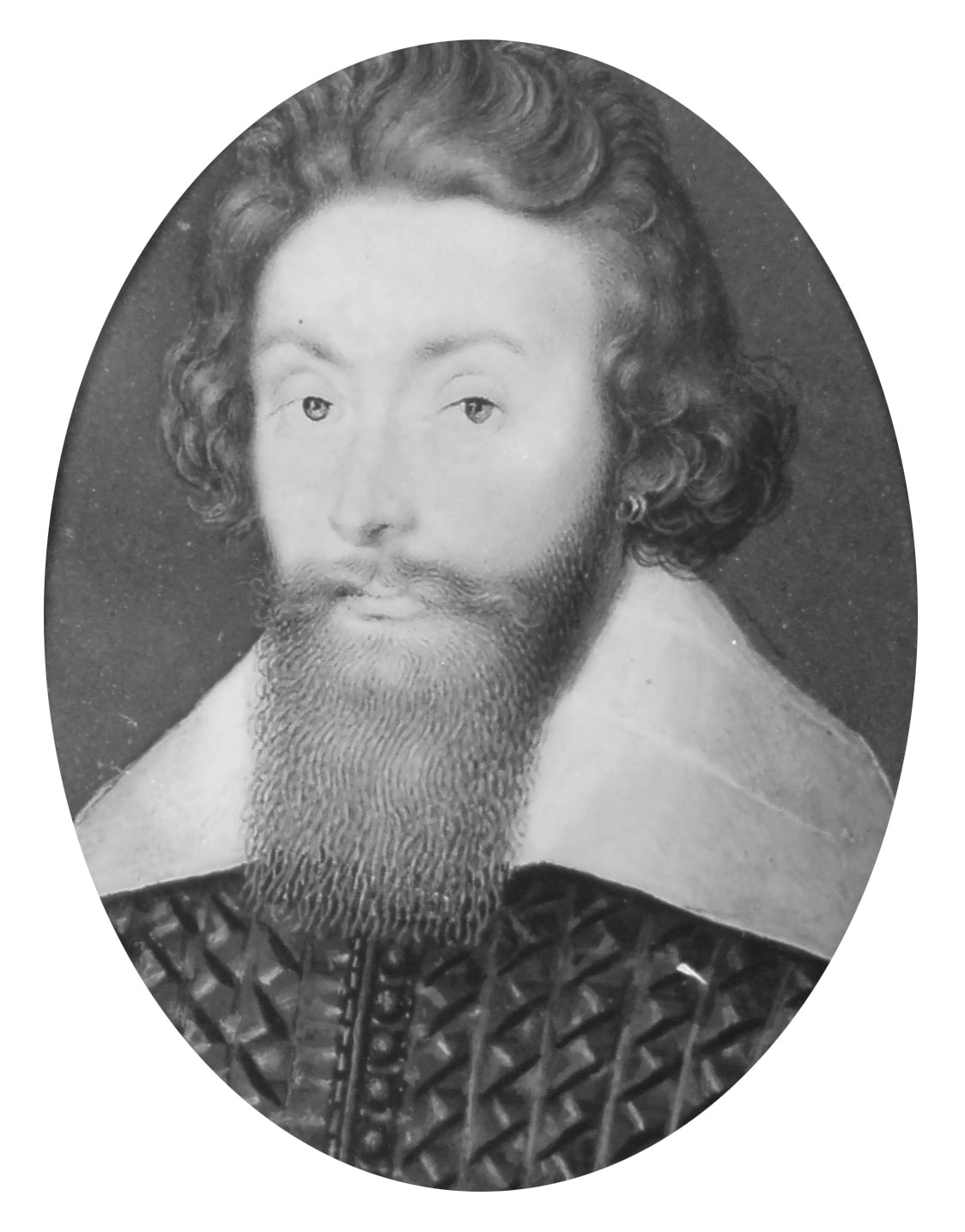
Portrait of Richard Leveson

At 10am, 6 December, Leveson's fleet arrived off Castlehaven; Zubiaur however was ready for them with an eight-gun battery at the mouth of the harbour. The ten gun Merlin rowed through Spanish fire to make a channel for the 518 ton Warspite to follow. A heavy pounding from the Spanish shore batteries and the vessels ensued, which inflicted some damage to the English ships.

The two sides battled until about 4pm - Zubiaur's flagship galleon Maria Francesca was sunk with most hands. The 200 ton Cisno Camello was holed below the waterline and settled in shallow water. A French hire ship used for supplies was pounded until it was set on fire and sunk. Continuous fire particularly from the big galleons Defiance and Warspite forced the crew of two more Spanish vessels to run them aground. Finally a Spanish merchant was boarded and captured, and it too was driven aground.

Leveson did not have the men to land ashore and take out the batteries - worse still his ships were running low on ammunition as they were continually returning fire. With the wind blowing onshore, Leveson's ships were not able to withdraw, and the Spanish were now being reinforced by more Irish footmen. Nevertheless, Leveson had set out and achieved his goal - all but one of the Spanish vessels had been neutralised. Leveson had no choice but for his ships to be towed out under fire from the remaining shore batteries. With his small fleet now gone, Zubiaur was now stuck and unable to get to Kinsale via the sea.

=== Battle of Kinsale ===
The Irish allies had managed to march their army's south in freezing December weather, O'Donnell having avoided Carew by going through the Slieve Felim Mountains in Tipperary. Mountjoy had received news on the 6 December of the imminent arrival of the Irish under both Tyrone and O'Donnell. Ocampo's Spaniards had joined up with Tyrone's men after a difficult march.

On 21 December reports arrived that the Irish had reached Spittle Hill - Mountjoy prepared for action. Nevertheless, his army was suffering - the shortage of supplies and the severe weather had begun to take a toll on the besieging English army, with many dying of dysentery and fever. Many of the Irish levies began to desert, and with the addition of winter weather many fell ill, leaving about 7,500 capable of fighting.

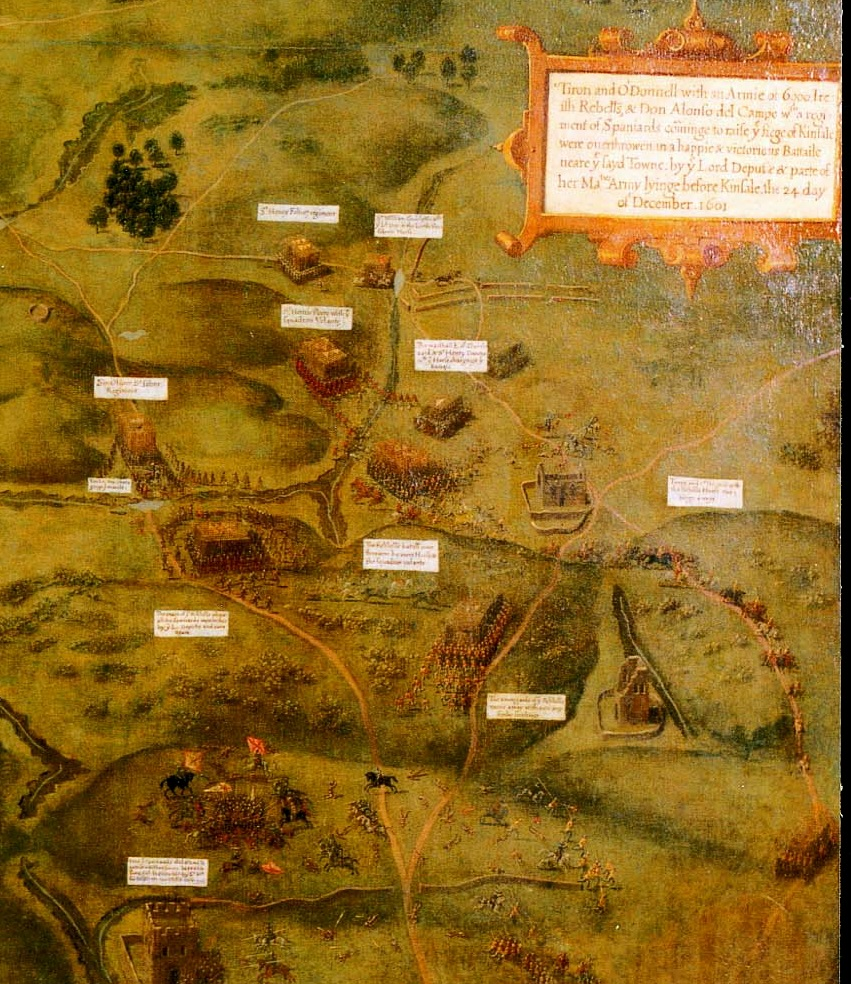
Map of the Battle of Kinsale

The Irish force that arrived at Ardmartin Hill near Kinsale in the pre-dawn of 23 December. The force consisted of over 6,000 men in two columns: 400 Leinster men under Richard Tyrrell, 1,000 Munstermen, Ocampo's 200 Spaniards in five companies of foot, and 2,500 foot and 500 light horse under Tyrone and 1,500 foot and 300 light horse under O'Donnell. The Irish plan was to occupy a strong defensive position on a hill near the town. When the English moved to attack the Irish, the Spanish would sally forth from Kinsale and trap them. For Mountjoy however a huge advantage was given to him by an Irish turncoat who gave him news of this combined assault, and so prepared his men.

On 24 December, the Irish advanced in a driving thunderstorm, the vanguard led by Tyrrell and attempted to march into battle in tercios - large squares of pikemen and musketeers. Tyrone got his men atop the hill after a long and tiring march. They set their pikes and kept their firelock matches lit, awaiting the English onslaught. Even though the storm had finished, fog and rain kept the Spanish from seeing the Irish in position and so did not move.

Tyrone noting the advance of the English called a halt and ordered his forces to retire off Ardmartin back towards the Millwater in order to draw them away from Kinsale. This also gave the English what they wanted, which was an Irish army exposed on the move in open ground. Mountjoy then ordered some 300 horse and 1,000 men under Colonel Richard Wingfield to harass O'Neill's body of troops seizing two key fords over an intervening stream. The English advanced again and Tyrone's army fell back but checked the initial English assault. The Irish cavalry however disordered their own infantry. Meanwhile, the English cavalry struck with a determined charge on the left flank which broke and routed the Irish. In the confusion the Irish infantry followed their horsemen and retreated as well.

Within moments, the retreat devolved into a rout with English troops cutting as many as they could down. The Spanish however managed to stand their ground, 200 of them standing alone, and unable to retreat. They were nearly annihilated before the remainder surrendered - Ocampo giving his sword to Captain John Pikeman, one of Mountjoy's cornets. The English also captured a number of standards.

Finally, around noon, the Spanish in Kinsale decided to advance after hearing gunfire. They halted when they saw a large body of English advancing towards them taunting them by displaying the captured Spanish flags with celebratory gunfire. The Spanish then sallied out, first in small numbers, probing the English defences without success, but at around 9 pm the Spaniards drew out in strength. Fighting raged in the darkness for two hours the Spanish managed to overrun the first trench but got no further and the English led by Oliver St John who was wounded in the process, forced them back to within the walls.

The Irish meanwhile, retreated back north in defeat and disarray. The English cavalry pursued them until they either were exhausted or could not go through boggy land. Tyrone escaped and managed an orderly retreat from then on. By the end of the battle the English had killed some 500-800 Irish and ninety Spanish soldiers. Of the Spanish some three fourths out of 200 were killed outright; the commander, two captains and 47 others ranks had surrendered. English losses in the battle were no more than twelve killed and maybe triple that number wounded. O'Donnell's rearguard however arrived too late to the battle and did not see action. Seeing the rout of Tyrone, O'Donnell now heartbroken attempted to reach Zubiaur at Castlehaven.

=== Surrender ===
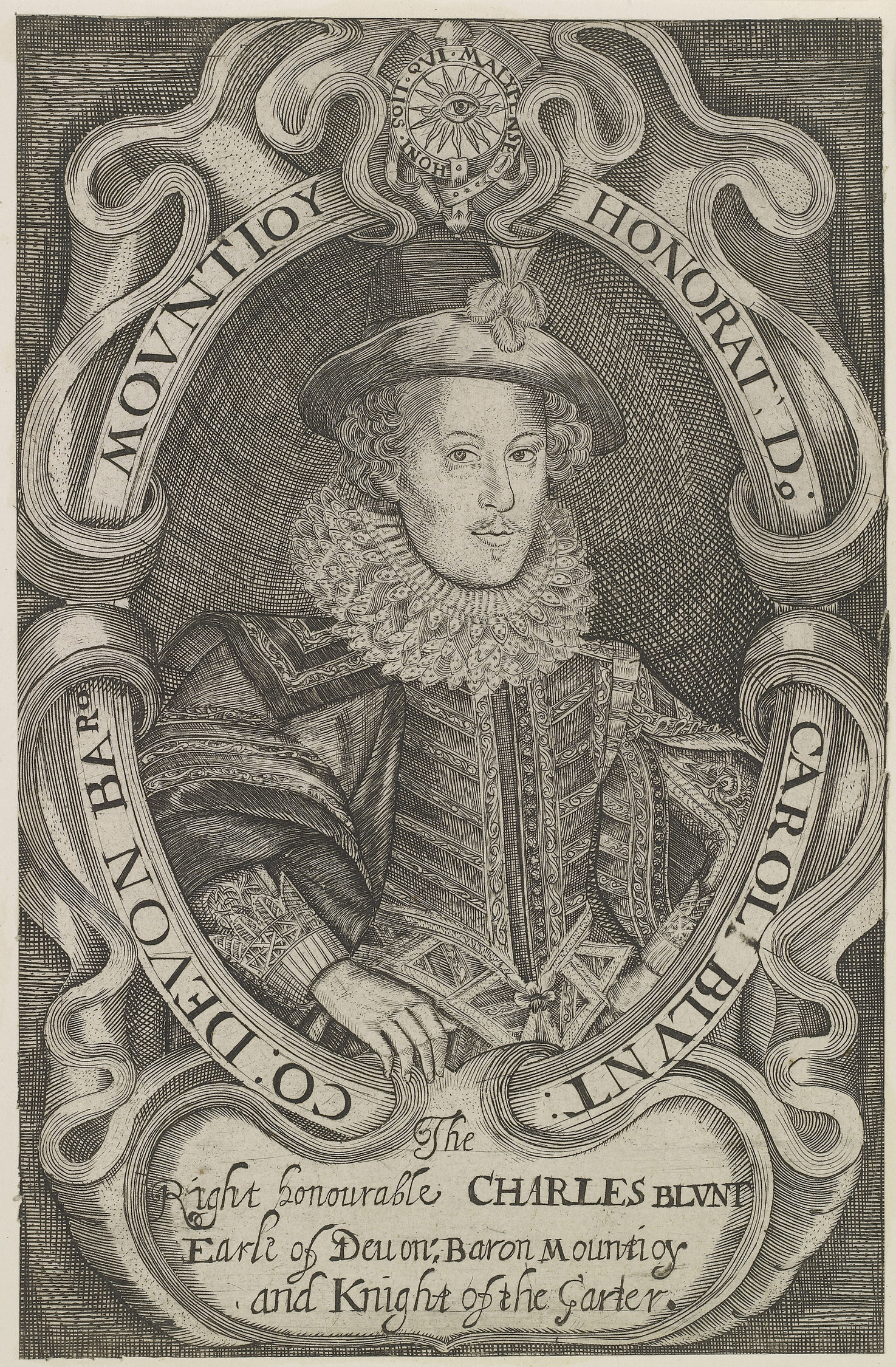
Charles Blount, Baron Mountjoy - the victor of Kinsale

Following the defeat, O'Donnell reached Castlehaven two days after the battle had ended. He told news of the defeat to Zubiaur, who begged him to appeal in person to King Philip to secure the assistance Spanish and Irish needed. They immediately set sail on a Scottish merchant ship for Spain on 27 December, leaving López de Soto in charge.

The English meanwhile resumed their encirclement of Kinsale, Águila saw his position as hopeless without effective action from the Irish. The Spanish, who had lost many men in the siege and without hope of reinforcements Águila called a council with his captains - some opted to fight to the death, but most saw no hope of victory. Ten days after the battle Águila called a truce, to meet with Mountjoy. After much discussion, Del Águila gave up the town to Mountjoy with Wingfield present, "on Terms" which were honourable. Kinsale was to be surrendered and the Spanish were allowed to leave with their colours flying, but were not allowed to take up arms against the English or Dutch during the war. It was agreed that they were to be conveyed back to Spain via the English in return for giving up their other garrisons at Castlehaven, Sherkin island, Dunasead and Dunboy.

An English force under Captain Robert Harvey and George Flower sailed and took the surrender of Lopez de Soto's Spanish garrison at Castlehaven on 10 February. Harvey and Soto dined together and hoped that there would be peace between England and Spain. Leaving his brother Gawan in charge, Harvey then ordered Soto to accompany him to Baltimore - the two castles; Donnelong on Sherkin Island and Dunasead on the mainland were surrendered and garrisoned by Harvey's troops. Another force under Captain George Flower with two companies however attempted to recover the Dunboy garrison under Captain Saavedra. The latter was preparing to hand the castle over to English forces when O'Sullivan's men who took over the fort and overpowered them. Contrary winds and sickness forced the English to return and thus Dunboy remained in O'Sullivan's hands. Saavedra's men were however released and sent to English lines for transportation back to Spain.

On receiving news of Flowers failed attempt, a Carew and Thormond set out with a force of 4,000 men in late May. The following month, they retook the castle and hanged the majority of prisoners. Following this Carew then attacked a small fort on the island of Dursey about 20 km away massacring the inhabitants.

=== Return to Spain ===
On 1 January 1602, five ships carrying two infantry companies and supplies led by Don Martin de la Cerda departed Lisbon for Ireland. Three were blown back to Galicia, but two arrived off Kinsale two weeks later. Águila was in Cork dining with Mountjoy at the Bishops palace when news of their arrival came. Mountjoy sent a caravel of eleven Englishmen whom the Spanish took on board telling them that Águila had already reached terms. The Spanish were persuaded to return so that no further ships be sent. When they did return the Spanish court refused to believe this was the case and so another fleet was to be sent, but further news of the defeat halted any further attempt.

On 20 February the first of the Spanish, some 1,400 men, was sent home via the English fleet. The second batch left on 8 March with 1,200 men, these included Soto's men from the Baltimore and Castlehaven garrisons - Águila accompanied them, and arrived in A Coruña. There, Águila paid from his pocket for a field hospital to treat the many wounded, dying and sick on board the ships. Of those that returned only 800 were left alive and fit for duty. It was later reported that of the 2,800 men that had come back almost all were dead.

== Aftermath ==
News of the Spanish surrender caused great alarm in Spain, and was a humiliating blow to King Philip III. He subsequently demanded a larger expedition of 14,000 men to be sent to Ireland "for the cause of religion and the sake of my reputation", ignoring Irish calls for a smaller expedition to Donegal. By May, however Spain's finances and navy were in a poor state, and so had to rely on Federico Spinola's small galley fleet to attempt an invasion via Flanders.

The armada had been costly in terms of men, ships and finance and had failed to divert English resources away from the Netherlands - the Spanish remained tied down at Ostend. Spanish councillors now feared for the safety of their treasure fleets which meant that the entire Atlantic seaboard went onto the defensive. There was thus a lack of confidence in the Spanish navy's ability to avoid defeat if confronted by the English and Dutch; tipping the balance in their favour. As a result, the English navy were able to roam the Iberian coast, defeating Spinolas's galleys; firstly at the Battle of Sesimbra Bay, and secondly with the Dutch, at the Battle of the Narrow Seas, thus gaining supremacy in European waters.

Richard Boyle was the first to bring news of the victory to court in London – Elizabeth greeted it with joy and relief. News of another victory came through just days later – the English and Dutch garrison led by Francis Vere, besieged at Ostend had just repelled a huge Spanish assault at great cost to the latter. The year 1602 for England had opened with two major successes against Spain – both Mountjoy and Vere were celebrated as heroes. Mountjoy in particular was mentioned in popular ballads and poems - and was forefront in the subject of Richard Vennar's play England's Joy which represented the nation's triumphs over Spain in a masque. The victory had also done so much to further a smoother succession once Elizabeth had died - which Mountjoy would later be recognized for. The campaign in Ireland however as a whole had been very costly, and with the Crown's obsolete financial system, Elizabeth had only just avoided bankruptcy. Such was the state that captured Spanish silver from the campaign for one was used by the English to mint new coinage for Ireland.

=== Spanish inquiry ===
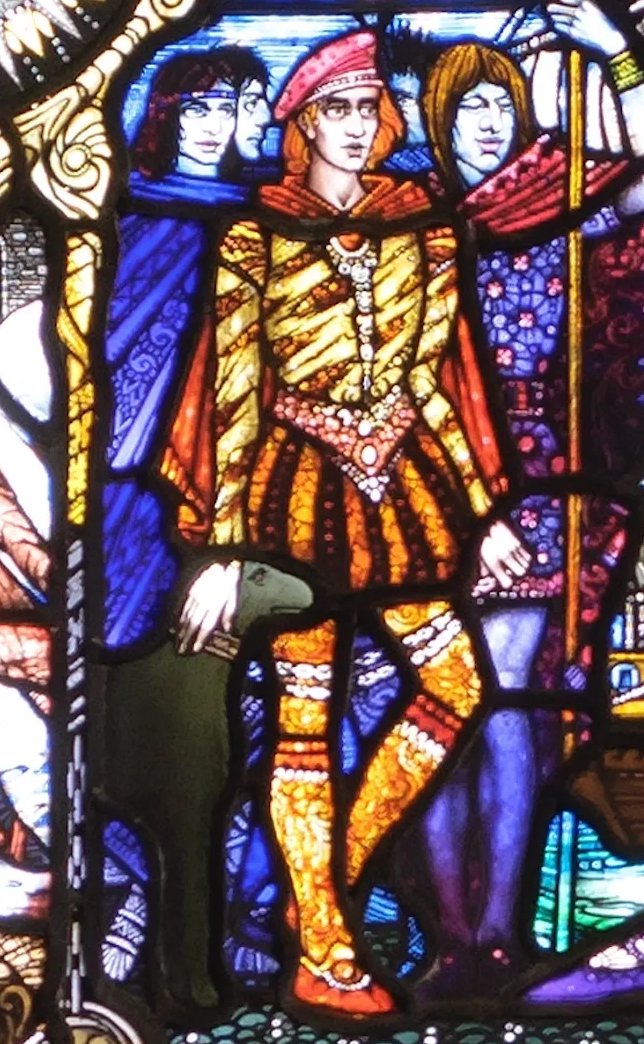
1934 portrait of O'Donnell

The Irish exiles led by O'Donnell were furious at Águila for the surrender of the three places that had been held. Spain's court too were angered and demanded an inquiry – a council of war was prepared and Águila was immediately used as a scapegoat. He was placed under house arrest, which prevented him from going to Madrid to explain his actions in Ireland. To the Spanish public this became a sensation – what would become known as the 'Águila scandal'. There were twelve charges laid against him, grouped into five topics.

The main question was why Águila came to terms with the English so rapidly, given his ample supplies of food, the known weakness of their forces and the offers of a number of Irish chieftains to keep him supplied. Águila deeply scarred by all the recriminations and unable to face the actions against him died later that year - according to reports, in grief. In late 1602, O'Donnell died in Simancas from a sudden illness. Prior to his death he petitioned Philip III to send another Spanish naval fleet to Ireland.

After Águila's death the council decided to fully acquit him. Diego Brochero too was cleared, but Philip ordered further investigations into those who appeared guilty. Heredia, the defender of Ringcurran, was thrown into prison, accused of having abandoned its defence. López de Soto and Zubiaur were also blamed for the disaster – both were condemned for failing to send any more Spanish soldiers to join Tyrone, against the express orders of Águila. López de Soto was convicted and banished from court for two years. Zubiaur was arrested for his initial failure to land in Ireland, and for his defeat by Leveson. He too was put on trial and convicted on only one of the four charges made against him.

The inquiry went until 1605 – the court found that the failure had been due to inexpert advice and failing resources. Oviedo was eventually cleared, but banished from court forever. Zubiaur after three years in prison was freed the same year in view of his thirty-seven years' service. He commanded a fleet against the Dutch in 1605, but died of the wounds sustained in battle.

=== Ending the wars ===
The failure of the fourth armada had put an end to Spain's long cherished dreams of conquering England, and ended help for Ireland. It also meant that the Duke of Lerma was now forced to put pressure on Philip III to extricate Spain from the war - the crown's finances had become severely stretched, and therefore a cut back in foreign expenditure was necessary. Negotiations thus became easier with amicable contacts being developed. This was also accelerated by the death of Elizabeth in March 1603, for whom the war was a fiercely personal matter. The ascension of King James I made peace more possible, as the latter desired an end to the war too. In June England and Spain began negotiations, which eventually concluded with the signing of the Treaty of London in August 1604. Ostend finally fell the following month - peace with the Dutch was concluded in 1609 after Spain was forced into bankruptcy as a result of the wars.

Tyrone made peace with Mountjoy on 30 March 1603, signing the Treaty of Mellifont. Mountjoy was well rewarded - appointed by James I as Master of the Ordnance, he was also given the more distinguished title of Lord-Lieutenant (1603–1604) and also created the Earl of Devonshire, granting him extensive estates. Despite the peace, Tyrone and his allies subsequently fled Ireland for good in 1607, which became known as the Flight of the Earls. The English then carried out a policy of colonisation known as the Plantations of Ireland following which the Protestant Ascendancy was assured.

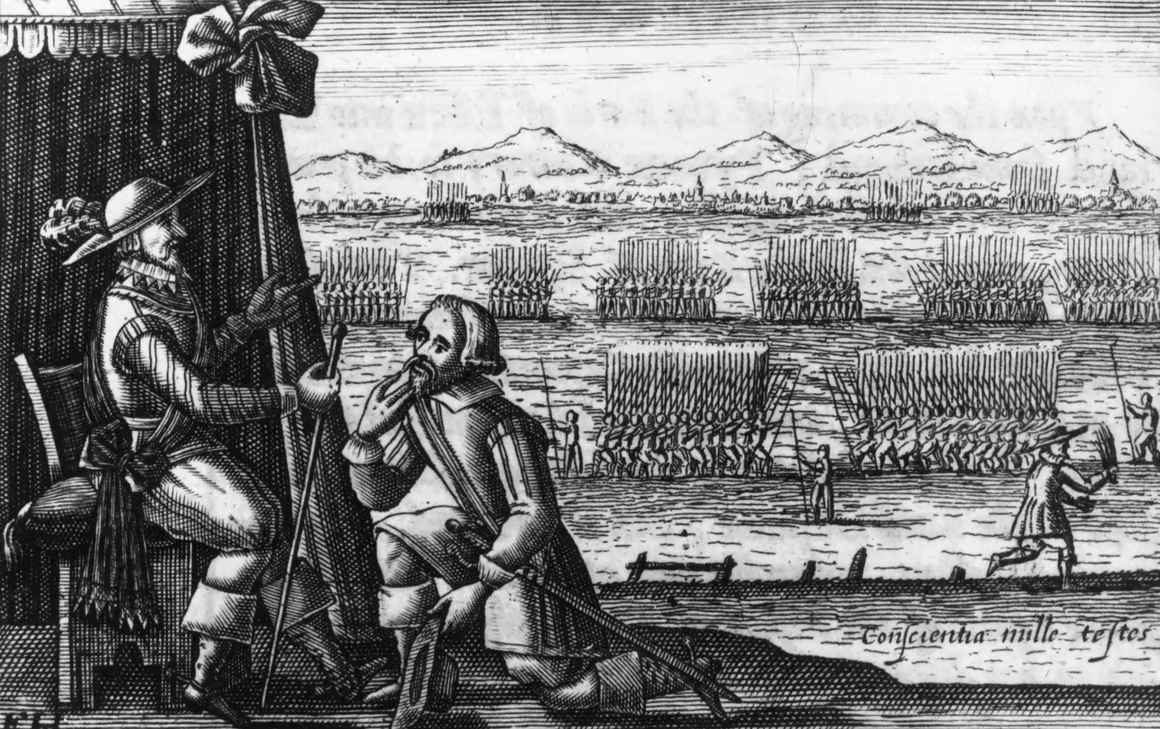
Treaty of Mellifont - Tyrone's submission to Mountjoy

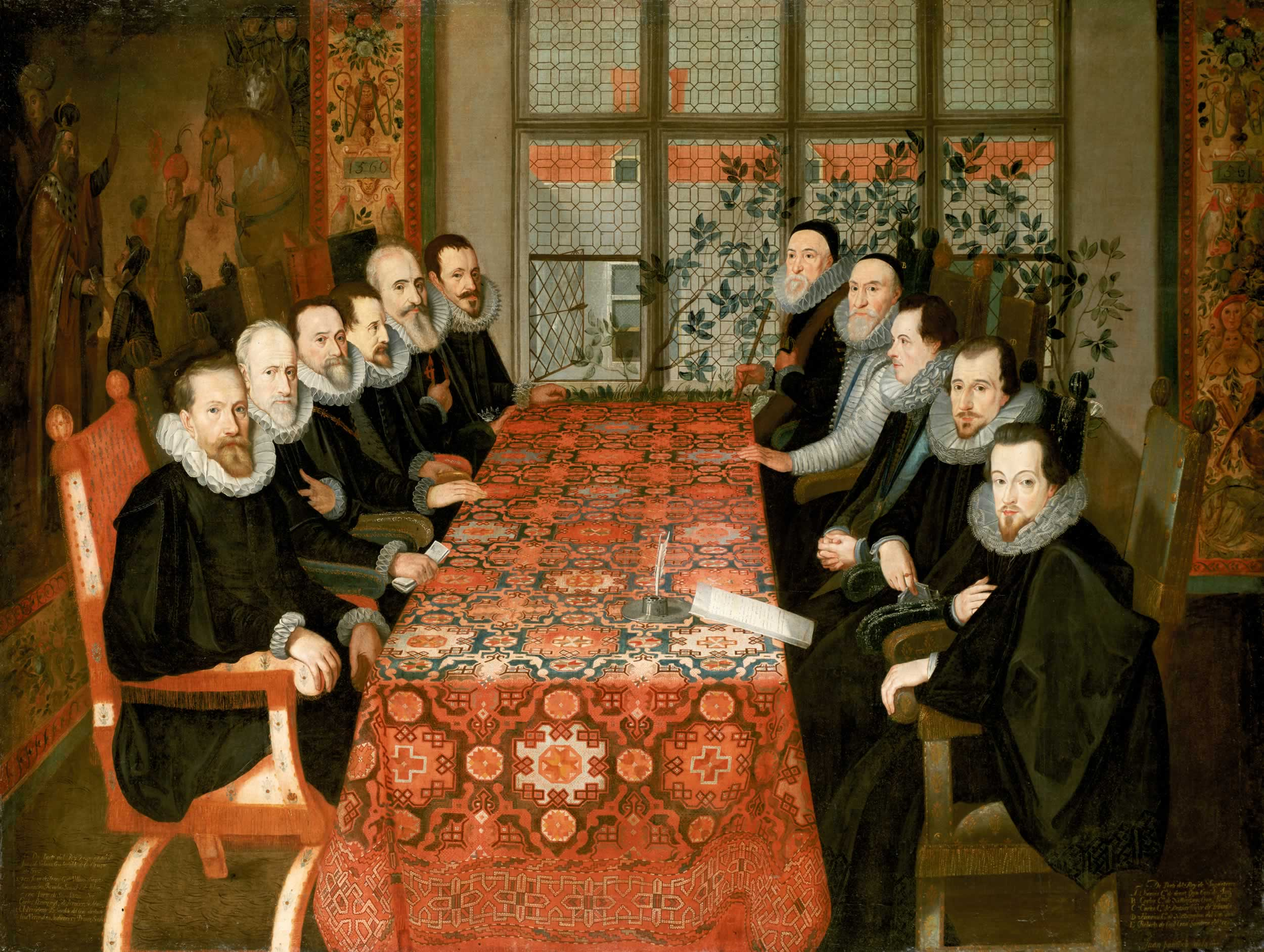
Treaty of London - the English delegation is on the right with Mountjoy (hand clasped) in the middle.

Following the Spanish withdrawal, the English strengthened the defences in Southern Ireland. In Kinsale James's Fort was later built on the site of 'Castle Ny-Parke', whilst on the other side Charles Fort was built in 1670's on the site of Ringcurran Castle. Defences were also strengthened at Cork Harbour, Baltimore and Berehaven.

The next time an attempt to invade the Southern coast of Ireland would be the Expédition d'Irlande in 1796.

== See also ==
- French expedition to Ireland (1796)

== Bibliography ==
Books

- Allen, Paul C (2000). Philip III and the Pax Hispanica, 1598-1621. New Haven. ISBN 9780300076820.
- Bicheno, Hugh. (2012). Elizabeth's Sea Dogs: How England's Mariners Became the Scourge of the Seas. Conway. ISBN 978-1-84486-174-3.
- Childs, David (2014). Pirate Nation: Elizabeth I and her Royal Sea Rovers. Seaforth. ISBN 9781848322943.
- Dutton, Richard (2006). Kewes, Paulina (ed.). The Uses of History in Early Modern England. Angel City Press. ISBN 9780873282192.
- Ekin, Des (2014). The Last Armada: Siege of 100 Days: Kinsale 1601. O'Brien Press. ISBN 9781847176998.
- Falls, Cyril (1997). Elizabeth's Irish Wars. Syracuse University Press. ISBN 9780815604358.
- Graham, Winston (2013). The Spanish Armadas. Pan Macmillan. ISBN 9781447256847.
- Hillgarth, J. N (2000). The Mirror of Spain, 1500-1700: The Formation of a Myth. University of Michigan Press. ISBN 9780472110926.
- Lenihan, Padraig (2014). Consolidating Conquest: Ireland 1603-1727 Longman History of Ireland. Routledge. ISBN 9781317868675.
- Consolidating Conquest: Ireland 1603-1727 Longman History of Ireland. Routledge. 2014. ISBN 9781317868675.
- MacCaffrey, Wallace T (1994). Elizabeth I: War and Politics, 1588–1603. Princeton Paperbacks Princeton University Press. ISBN 978-0691036519.
- McCoog, Thomas M (2012). The Society of Jesus in Ireland, Scotland, and England, 1589-1597: Building the Faith of Saint Peter Upon the King of Spain's Monarchy. Ashgate & Institutum Historicum Societatis Iesu. ISBN 978-1-4094-3772-7.
- Morgan, Hiram (2004). The Battle of Kinsale. Wordwell Ltd. ISBN 1869857704.
- Ó Buachalla, Breandán (2006). The Crown of Ireland. Syracuse University Press. ISBN 9781903631416.
- O'Connor, Thomas; Lyons, Mary Ann (2003). Irish Migrants in Europe After Kinsale, 1602-1820. Four Courts Press. ISBN 9781851827015.
- Palmer, William (1994). The Problem of Ireland in Tudor Foreign Policy, 1485-1603. Boydell & Brewer Ltd. ISBN 9780851155623.
- Pendrill, Colin (2002). Spain 1474-1700. The Triumphs and Tribulations of Empire. Pearson Education. ISBN 9780435327330.
- Quinn, David B; Ryan, A N (2023). England's Sea Empire, 1550-1642. Taylor & Francis. ISBN 9781000963748.
- Roy, James Charles (2021). The Elizabethan Conquest of Ireland. Pen & Sword Books. ISBN 9781526770752.
- Silke, John J (2000). Kinsale: the Spanish intervention in Ireland at the end of the Elizabethan wars. Liverpool University Press. ISBN 978-1-85182-551-6.
- Shapiro, James (2009). A Year in the Life of William Shakespeare 1599. Harper Collins. ISBN 9780061840906.
- Sloan, Geoffrey R (1997). The Geopolitics of Anglo-Irish Relations in the Twentieth Century. A&C Black. ISBN 9780718513566.
- Stafford, Thomas (1896). A history of the wars in Ireland, during the reign of Queen Elizabeth Vol. II. Downy. ISBN 1-170-31027-3.
- Stradling, R A (1994). The Spanish Monarchy and Irish Mercenaries: The Wild Geese in Spain, 1618-68. Irish Academic Press. ISBN 9780716525097.
- Wernham, R B (1994). The Return of the Armadas: The Last Years of the Elizabethan Wars Against Spain 1595-1603. Oxford: Clarendon Press. ISBN 978-0198204435.

Journals

- O Scea, Ciaran (January 2003). "The significance and legacy of Spanish intervention in west Munster during the Battle of Kinsale". ResearchGate. Four Courts Press.
- Silke, John J (March 1963). "Why Aguila Landed at Kinsale". Irish Historical Studies. 13 (51). Cambridge University Press: 236–245. doi:10.1017/S002112140000866X. JSTOR 30021973.
