= Jeff Martin 777 =

- Origin: Perth, Western Australia, Australia
- Genres: Alternative rock, hard rock
- Years active: 2010–2012
- Past members: Jeff Martin; Malcolm Clark; Jay Cortez
- Website: jeffmartin777.com

Jeff Martin 777 was an Australian-Canadian rock band from Perth, Western Australia. The band's name was inspired by Jeff Martin's study of the occult, specifically the work of Aleister Crowley. Martin formed the band with former Sleepy Jackson members Malcolm Clark and Jay Cortez in 2010, after the demise of his previous band The Armada. The band ended in 2012 after the re-activation of Martin's former group The Tea Party in 2011.

== Biography ==
Following the disbanding of his group The Tea Party in 2005, Canadian singer-songwriter Jeff Martin lived for sometime in Ireland before settling in Perth. In 2008 he formed The Armada, releasing a self-titled album. After this, Martin toured as a duo with Jay Cortez, formerly of Perth bands End of Fashion and The Sleepy Jackson and in 2010 the pair formed a new band with Sleepy Jackson drummer Malcolm Clark. "Perth is where I met two of the finest musicians in the country" said Martin. This group was dubbed "Jeff Martin 777", a name Martin derived from his interest in the works of Aleister Crowley, in this case his 777 and Other Qabalistic Writings. Work commenced on an album at Clark's Perth studios.

During the year, Martin toured as a duo with DIG drummer Terepai Richmond while the album was mastered. In January 2011, the album's title track was released on Martin's MySpace page. The Ground Cries Out was released in Canada on 1 March 2011 and the band undertook a short Canadian tour. The album peaked at No. 51 on the Canadian Albums Chart. It was subsequently released in Australia in April, followed by a tour in May 2011. Soon afterward, The Tea Party reunited permanently and this band ended.

== Band members ==
- Jeff Martin – vocals, guitar
- Malcolm Clark – drums, backing vocals
- Jay Cortez – bass, backing vocals

== Discography ==
=== Album ===
- The Ground Cries Out – 1 March 2011 (#51 Canada) - described as Middle Eastern inflected super rock with a country-tinged blues sound.
