= Third Spanish Armada =

Fleet of Spanish ships, intended to attack England in 1597

- Part of the Anglo-Spanish War
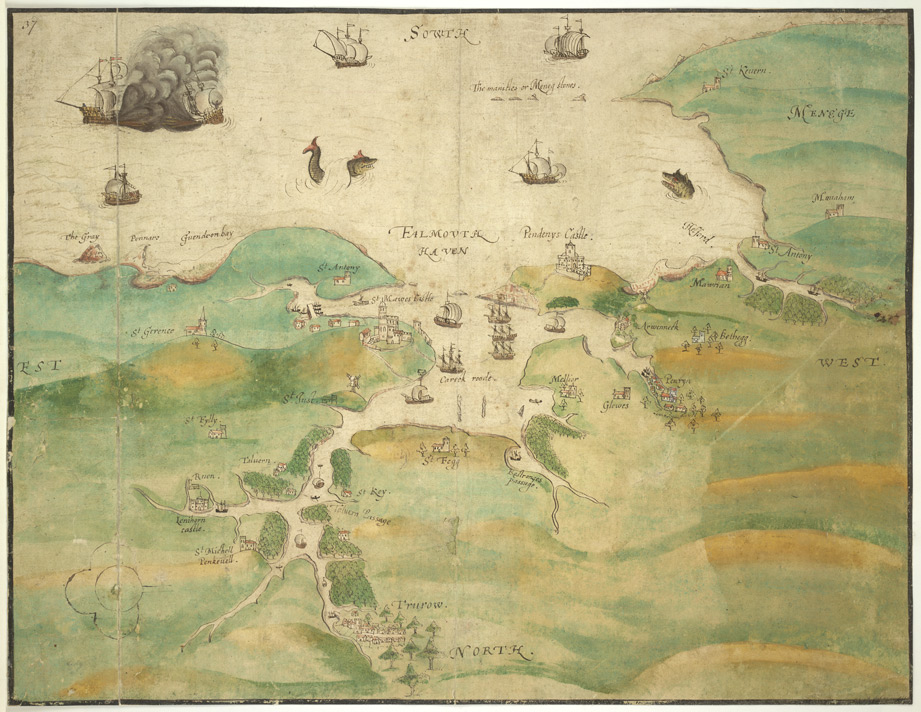
- Falmouth at the time of invasion
Date	18 October – 15 November 1597
Location	Cornwall, Wales, English Channel
Result	English victory

Belligerents
Spain	England

Commanders and leaders
(Spain) Philip II (Spain) Juan del Águila (Spain) Diego Brochero (Spain) Martín de Padilla (Spain) Carlos de Amésquita (Spain) Pedro de Zubiaur	(England) Elizabeth I (England) Charles Howard (England) Charles Blount (England) Walter Raleigh (England) Robert Devereux (England) Ferdinando Gorges

Strength
Fleet: 44 galleons 16 merchant galleons 52 hulks 24 small craft Troops; 9,634 soldiers 4,000 sailors Total: 140 ships 13,000–14,000 men	Fleet: 12 ships rising to 120 ships (23 October); Troops: 500 (October) rising to 8,000 (November)

Casualties and losses
6 ships captured, 400 captured Storms; 22 ships sunk or destroyed 1,000 dead Total: 28 ships, 1,500 killed or captured	1 bark sunk Low

The Third Spanish Armada, also known as the Spanish Armada of 1597, was involved in a major naval event that took place between 18 October and 15 November 1597 as part of the Anglo–Spanish War. The attack of the armada, which was the third attempt by Spain to invade or raid the British Isles during the war, was ordered by King Philip II of Spain in revenge for the English attack on Cádiz following the failure of the 2nd Spanish Armada the previous year due to a storm. The Armada was executed by the Adelantado Martín de Padilla, which had the same objective as the second armada – the support of the Irish rebels in rebellion against the English crown. It was also an opportunity to intercept and destroy the English fleet under Robert Devereux the 2nd Earl of Essex as it returned from the failed Azores expedition. The objective of landing in Ireland changed due to conflicting ideals - instead the armada was to capture either the important port of Falmouth or Milford Haven and use those places as a base for invasion.

With 140 ships and 14,000 soldiers and sailors the Spanish set out in October 1597 and arrived in the English Channel. As they approached near the Lizard they were dispersed by a storm which scattered their fleet. Even so, some ships did push on and even landed troops on the English and Welsh coasts. The returning English fleet, which had been scattered by the same storm, were unaware that the Spanish had come to intercept them, and had arrived safely in England with the loss of only one ship. Padilla realising his fleet was unable to make full landfall, finally ordered a retreat back to Spain. The returning English ships captured a number of Spanish ships, from which valuable information was obtained about the Armada.

Panic in England then ensued, partly because the English fleet had been out to sea with the English coast virtually undefended. This caused the relationship between Queen Elizabeth I of England and the Earl of Essex to deteriorate further and Charles Howard, the 1st Earl of Nottingham, took over from Essex as commander of the English fleet. Howard immediately sent the fleet out to hunt the Spanish Any remaining Spanish ships were rounded up and captured along with their soldiers and crew, most of whom had arrived back at port. Philip took much of the blame for the failure by the Armada commanders, particularly Padilla. The Armada was the last of its kind that the Spanish would execute under Philip II before his death.

== Background ==
The war with Spain and England had been going on for nearly twelve years and both sides had achieved little in their goals. The result of the intervention of Philip II in the religious war in France in support of the Catholic League, meant that the Spanish had established coastal garrisons along the French and Flemish coast by the 1580s. These bases had a huge strategic value because they allowed England to be threatened by the Spanish fleet and troops. Meanwhile, England also intervened in France, but in support of King Henry IV of France, by the Treaty of Greenwich in 1591. The Spaniards had captured Calais in 1596 which meant that an invasion of England could be more achievable. As a result, after desperate French demands to keep her from signing peace with Spain, the English signed the Triple Alliance with the Dutch Republic and France. England had sent an armada the next year under the Earl of Essex and Charles Howard to Cádiz which was captured and sacked. An angered Philip soon after took into consideration the defence of the peninsula.

In a wave of revenge after the defeat at Cádiz, Philip II sent out orders for a large armada to do the same to England by way of taking the French port of Brest. Just after they set off however the fleet was obliterated in autumn storms off Cape Finisterre causing severe losses in ships (including a few galleons known as the Apostles), men, supplies, and money. The cost was ruinous; the two ships carrying the pay-chests disappeared below the waves. The Spanish King not to be disheartened ordered another invasion despite the Cortes Generales claiming funds would not be available in time. As a result, the Cortes was asked to be dissolved by Philip and a financial crisis loomed. The Cádiz defeat, the failure of the Armada, as well as the war in France and the Netherlands that year meant that Philip's nation went into bankruptcy; the third of his reign. Adding to the King's and Spain's woes, a poor harvest began to take effect in the country and thousands were affected. This caused many to protest as they were unable to pay their taxes. The formation of the Triple Alliance meant that grain from abroad was harder to obtain. Despite this, the fleet albeit with great difficulty was mustered and men were pressed into service across the empire. There was a heavy reliance on the Italian holdings to make up the losses from the previous year's failed armada as well as funds and supplies.

=== The Armada ===
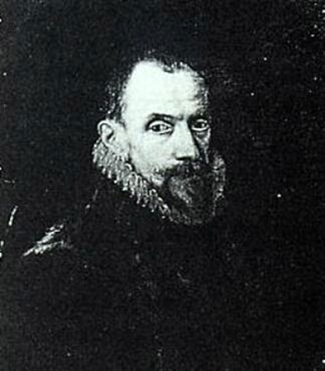
Juan del Aguila - Field master general of the Armada

Pedro Lopez de Soto, of Castile, the Secretary of the Adelantado, was to command the fleet. The whole force, according to Lopez de Soto's estimate was huge in terms of men, ships, and supplies. The primary original objective was Ireland to support the rise of the rebels under Hugh O'Neill, Earl of Tyrone, but the senior Spanish commanders wanted to attack England instead. The Spanish King however intervened and ordered an attack on Brest to divert troops from the garrisons in the Low Countries. When news came however that the English had sailed in force again under Essex, and were first on the coasts of the Peninsula, and then cruising round the Azores to capture the treasure fleets, there was shock at the Spanish court. This news would put difficulties which Philip's system had created for himself. The King was swept away by a passion for revenge so much so he resolved to carry out his objective as swiftly as possible even at the expense of preparation.

At A Coruña the fleet was assembled under the command of Juan del Aguila as field master general, and Martín de Padilla the Adelantado, commander of the invading troops. The plan had now switched from Ireland with the objective of the Port of Falmouth in Cornwall. The Spanish were to hold the town and port and force Elizabeth into a peace or hoping to attract the Catholic followers and rise up in support. It was estimated that this would be far larger than that of the 1588 invasion attempt. The troopships were to take Falmouth, while the warships would also intercept and destroy Essex's returning fleet from the Azores. The other target as a failsafe as well as a strategic diversion was Milford Haven in Wales, a good landing ground from which Henry VII had landed his men to defeat King Richard III in 1485. A Spanish observer had noted that Milford contained many Welsh Catholics who were hostile to the English. The true intentions of the Armada, however, were confusing to the captains and officers, as they didn't really know whether this was an invasion, a raid, or a naval interception. For fear of spies and deserters in the fleet, only the high command knew, and they were taking no chances. All would be revealed only as they approached the English Channel.

Location of Milford Haven in Pembrokeshire, Wales

The taking and holding of Falmouth or Milford was a strategy the Spanish would use to hold a piece of England in retaliation for the seizure of Cádiz. In turn this would be used as a bargaining chip to force English troops to withdraw from the continent, both in France and the United Provinces. If they did not, then the captured places would also be used as a forward base for the harassment of English and Dutch trade.

In all 108 ships were at A Coruña, most others would join after departing from other ports. By 1 October the fleet consisted of 136 ships of 34,080 tons, of these were 44 royal galleons, of an aggregate tonnage of 12,686 tons; 16 merchantmen, of 5880 tons, 52 German and Flemish hulks for stores, of 15,514 tons, and 24 caravels, pinnaces, and barks. There were 8,634 soldiers, 4,000 sailors, a total of 12,634 men and 300 horses. In this squadron of 32 Andalusia troopships included Carlos de Amésquita who had raided Cornwall two years earlier. These carried the elite Spanish military units known as tercios, many were from the Spanish domains in Italy such as Naples and Lombardy and had rarely been beaten in battle.

The Spanish Armada of 1597, as incomplete as it was, put to sea from A Coruña on 18 October. However, with a military force very different from that foreshadowed by Lopez de Soto's estimate.

== Execution ==
The Armada left A Coruña and Ferrol after which a fleet under Admiral Diego Brochero was to meet another from Blavet in Brittany (under Spanish rule) with a thousand men under Pedro de Zubiaur. Zubiaur joined them for a council of war which was made to settle the final details of the landing.

After three days of sailing in good weather, the fleet arrived in the Channel, after advancing towards the English coast without opposition. As they sailed on, an English bark was intercepted and sunk, with what was left of the crew being taken prisoner.

=== Storm ===
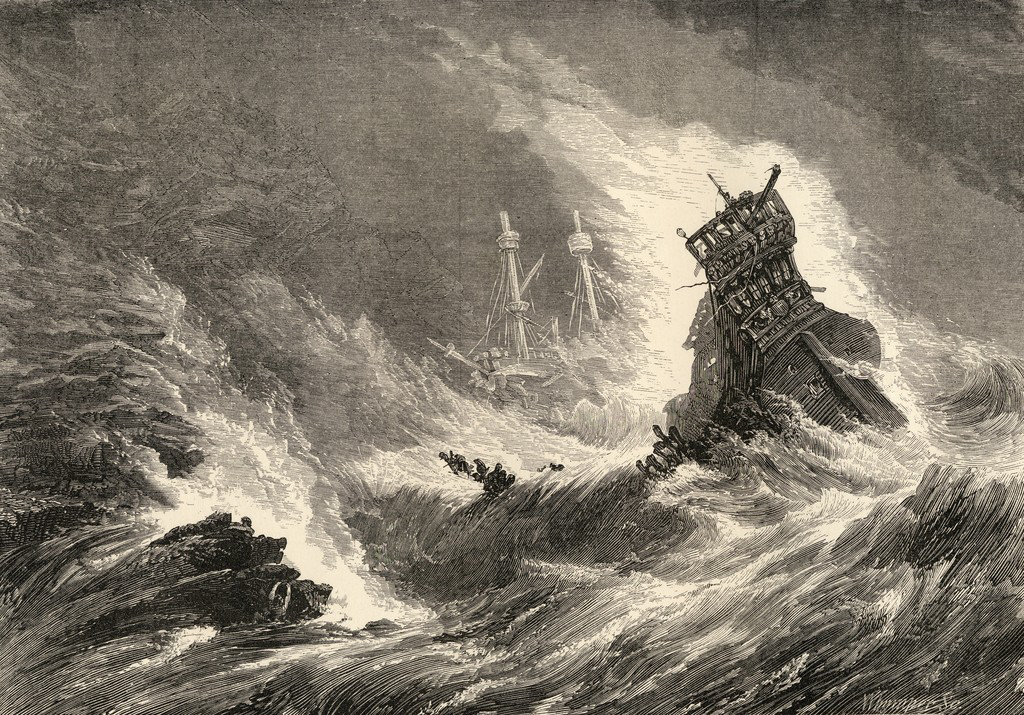
Spanish ships in a storm.

Events changed otherwise as the weather turned. An easterly wind turned into a gale and for a few days the storm would continue. This time however there were no catastrophic results such as those of 1588 and the Spanish were more organised in ship-to-ship communication.

At first, the Adelantado tried to ride out the storm in the hope that the weather would relent. But at dawn the next day, the winds only intensified. For three days the storm blew, Spanish ship losses increased, the San Lucas ran aground off the Lizard casting away their horses and mules. The galleon carrying Don Pedro Guevera – General of artillery - caught fire, blew up in a tremendous explosion, and was never seen again. Another large vessel with siege equipment and flammables (for burning English ships in Falmouth) also suffered a catastrophic explosion which took with her a chartered French ship full of soldiers. Only one of the large galleons sank, the San Bartolomé, when it was dashed on rocks near the Isles of Scilly. In the San Pedro, Brochero had to drop out of the station to a Biscay port as the ship was so badly damaged, but he was put to sea again in a flyboat and rejoined the armada. He attempted to rally them in one last effort to make a landing at Milford Haven, Waterford, Cork or Brest. On the night of 25 October, seeing that the currents were unrelenting he reluctantly ordered the remaining ships to start to part company and to scatter, each one thinking of their own safety.

=== Interceptions and landings ===
One Spanish ship dismasted by the storm was captured off the Scilly Isles by an English pinnace. Even though it sank on its way to Penzance, the prisoners, including its captain, master, and purser, were brought in and sent to Falmouth. Here the English captain reported that the Spanish fleet was some thirty leagues off the Scilly Isles. In addition the Spanish prisoners had with them letters and plans on their rendezvous at Falmouth. This was the first indication of presence of the Armada off the Cornish shores and immediately the Privy Council met. However, the evidence from only one ship was not enough. Also, the English fleet had not yet arrived. They could only send orders, pay, and supplies to the fleet in hope that it would return in time. The few ships in the area, including the Vanguard, were immediately sent. The Queen's cousin, the Earl of Ormond, was given command of all military forces in Ireland in case the Spanish ships decided on landfall there. Elizabeth herself was told of the Spanish fleet on 26 October, two days after opening Parliament.

The storm had a huge effect on the Spanish fleet. Several ships were swept up much further north of Cornwall to the Welsh coast. The Spanish captains then rendezvoused as instructed. Three Spanish ships came near Pembrokeshire and headed towards Milford Haven, the secondary objective. The forty-ton caravel Nuestra Senora Buenviage was driven ashore by the storm in Milford Haven, where she was captured and then plundered. She had gold and silver aboard, and the Welsh militia fought over it, with a man wounded. Another vessel was beached near Aberdyfi on 26 October, the 120-ton Bear of Amsterdam. Poor navigation meant that she had missed Milford Haven but had sailed via the Dyfi Estuary instead. They landed men ashore but were ambushed by the Merionethshire Militia having lost two killed and four captured. They then retreated back to their ship but were unable to leave due to lack of wind. Off Caldey Island, a Spanish treasure ship from Dunkirk had run aground, but disorder among the locals allowed the ship to escape.

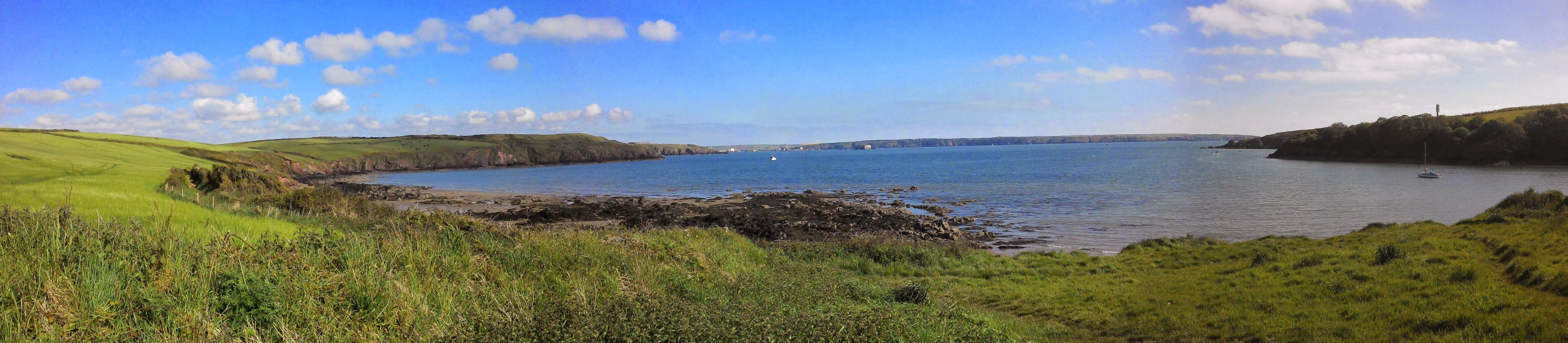
Panoramic of Sandy Haven beach near Milford Haven. A few Spanish ships ended up around here.

In Cornwall a Spanish force landed 700 elite soldiers on a beach in one of the creeks off the Helford River near Falmouth, and dug in, waiting for reinforcements. English militia began to arrive in large numbers (although poorly armed), but the Spanish fleet was still hopelessly dispersed. With no hope of reinforcement, the Spanish troops re-embarked in the dark, after just two days ashore.

=== English preparations ===
The rumours caused confusion and as a result Plymouth and the surrounding area were put on alert. Sir Ferdinand Gorges, the Governor of the Fort at Plymouth, put a 500-man guard on the town and a pinnace was sent out to feedback sightings of the Spanish fleet. Gorges was fed reports of the landings in Cornwall and Wales and sightings of Spanish ships. He immediately sent the information to parliament and the Queen in London in the quickest possible time. An excited panic set in motion across much of England and Wales. Troops were being recalled from Amiens in France (it had recently been captured by the Anglo-French force the previous month) and for the mobilization of troops in the West Country. Charles Blount, the 8th Baron Mountjoy, was put in command of the English land forces while the few galleons from Chatham were sent to the Cornish and Devon coasts. Although dispersed by a storm they reached Falmouth a few days later, but on arrival had not seen any Spanish ships.

At the same time some of the Spanish ships were still a presence off the coast of England, milling about in confusion without being able to make any harbour. Eventually with a wind astern, the order was given by Brochero to head back to Spain and they sailed back in disorder to A Coruña.

=== English fleet arrives ===
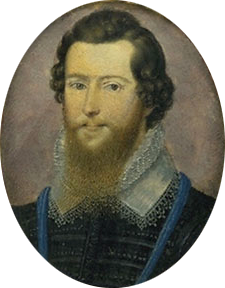
The Earl of Essex

On 23 October the day after the Spanish had ordered a dispersal, leading elements of the English fleet had started to return to Falmouth, Plymouth, and Dartmouth but amazingly had completely missed the retreating Spanish fleet. At one point both fleets English and Spanish were on converging lines with one another. Essex on arrival soon learned from Mountjoy of the situation and both were surprised as each other as to how the English fleet had missed the Spanish. Essex immediately wrote letters to parliament and the Queen in order to salvage the situation. Initially he was invested by the Queen with full powers sent down to him. The channel squadron was ordered to join his flag. The government soon after were impressed by his actions and understandings of the intentions of the Spanish fleet: the capture of Falmouth or Milford Haven or the interception of the English fleet from the Azores. However soon after in one spirited letter by the Queen he was reprimanded by her for his failings in the Azores and the addition of England having been left unguarded. Essex immediately went to Court to explain his actions but was to be met by an icy disapproval from the Queen, after which he went home to Wanstead to nurse his misery. Howard of Effingham in Essex's absence was given the command of the fleet to make sure the threat was alleviated.

A few days later the last of the English had arrived which included Vice Admiral of the fleet Sir Walter Raleigh in the galleon Warspite under commander Sir Arthur Gorges who was swept up round to St Ives. Warspite was heading into the port for repairs but soon sighted a Spanish bark and a pinnace. Gorges intercepted them and after a very brief action captured them both along with the soldiers and crew. Then he took the prizes into St Ives. Juan Triego, the captain of the pinnace, was interrogated by Gorges and Raleigh. He was forced to give away Spanish plans and dispositions. They also learnt that the Spanish had previously gathered intelligence on the English coast a year before. Perez, the captain of the bark, also confirmed the same information. All the other prisoner officers and captains both from St Ives and Milford Haven were interrogated. Detailed information of the strength and organisation of the fleet was obtained. Its formidable size was clearly understood for the first time. The Spanish fleet had come as close as ten leagues from The Lizard, although the danger at this time was still real. Reports from returning English ships from the Azores voyage had seen Spanish ships albeit at long range.

=== Sortie ===
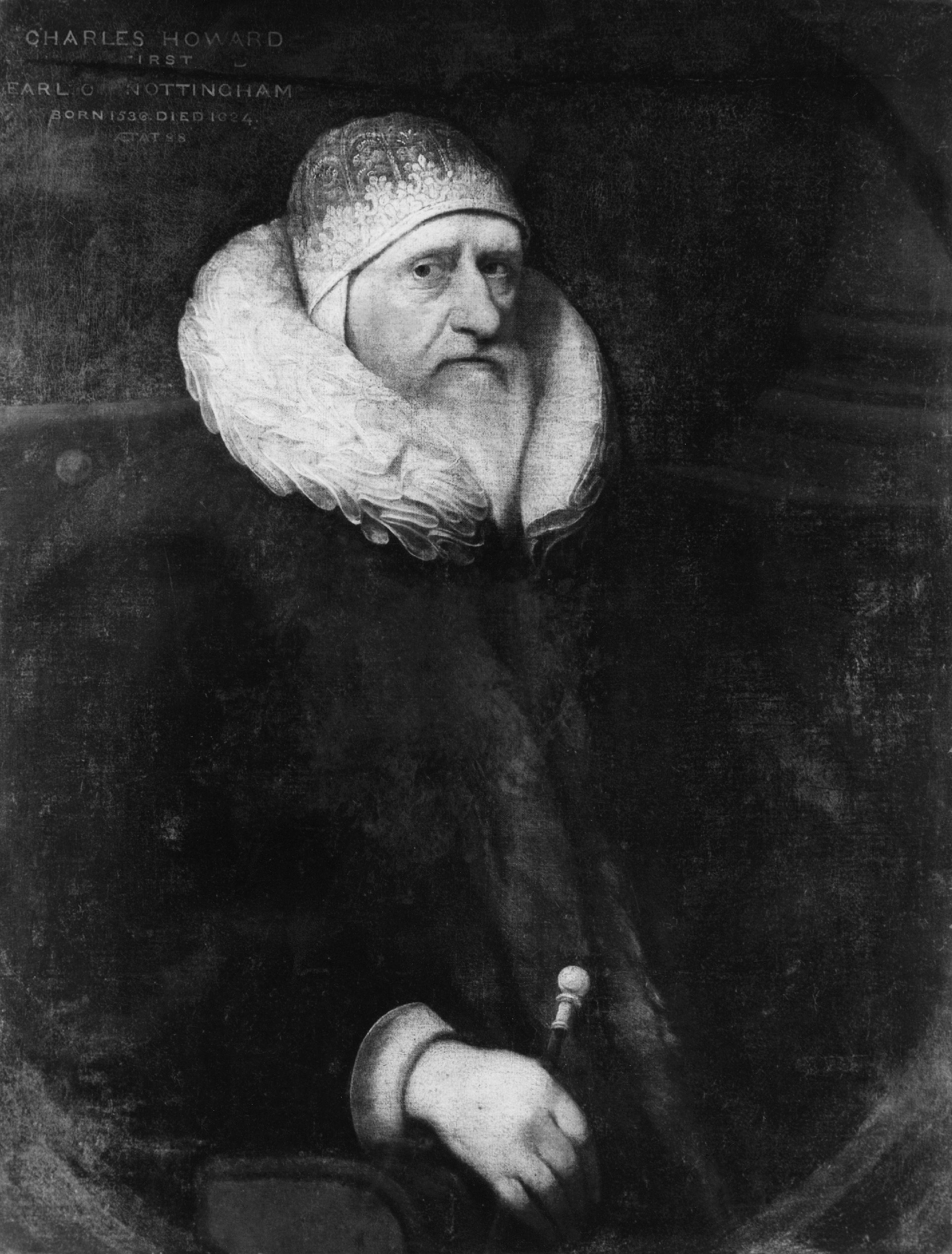
Charles Howard, 1st Earl of Nottingham

Raleigh, having been made Lieutenant General, went overland from St Ives and joined Howard in Plymouth. They hurriedly put a small fleet to sea (many of the crew were exhausted from the Azores cruise) to pursue the Spanish. Mountjoy took command on land organising the troops and militia of Plymouth and the surrounding area, and would soon be reinforced by troops from the Low Countries. By the time the English had put to sea the lead elements of the Spanish had already arrived safely at A Coruña although the English knew nothing of this. The English scouted as far as the Bay of Biscay, even heading to Western French ports for any evidence of Spanish arrivals.

On the 30th a warship under the command of Captain Bowden from Howard's fleet intercepted and captured a ship from the Spanish fleet off Cape Finisterre. The prize was a flyboat carrying an army captain and 40 soldiers besides sailors, and Bowden boarded and took her with a crew of only 28 men and boys. The captain and officers were again interrogated and the same evidence of the Spanish invasion was given, but the news this time was that the captain had only seen one of his cohorts, heading some 30 leagues to the coast of Spain. Further evidence of the Spanish retreat was given by Sir George Carew in the Adventure who after a storm had driven his squadron further south. He saw and immediately pursued eleven ships bearing the flag of Castile hastening back home to Spain. The Spanish ships were too far ahead to be intercepted however so Carew joined Howard with the main fleet to give the news. These two reports meant that the invasion was effectively over; Howard and Raleigh sent the fleet back to Plymouth to report the news to Parliament and court.

=== End ===
The only Spanish ship in the area left from the Armada; the 120-ton Bear of Amsterdam was still at Aberdyfi. After ten days because of a lack of wind the Bear of Amsterdam could not be boarded by the militia as there were no suitable boats. An attempt to burn the ship was thwarted by the wind and the Bear of Amsterdam eventually left. She was driven around the Cornish peninsula and swept up the channel by an easterly gale suffering some damage. Hoping to see the Spanish already at Falmouth, the ship was captured not far off from there on 10 November by a waiting English squadron. She was led into Dartmouth with 70 Spaniards taken prisoner, and this being the last ship from the Armada to be captured.

== Aftermath ==
By the middle of November it was clear that the Spanish Armada invasion had obviously failed and some floating remains of Spanish ships were coming ashore on the English coast. The fleet, militias, and troops were kept on alert but it was realized that the danger had passed and were thus disbanded for winter quarters. Troops that had arrived from the continent either returned to Holland or France once the situation had abated.

Overall seven ships and around 15 other vessels were sunk. Six Spanish ships in total from the armada were captured by the English all over the South West of England and West Wales. Only one large galleon was lost, while a merchant hulk was captured by the French in which its 300 crew were imprisoned. In all between 1,500 and 2,000 troops, sailors, and civilians were lost, captured, or were sick to disease. A muster on 21 November put the number of ships at A Coruña at 108 vessels with many in need of repairs, while the entire fleet required new provisions, especially victuals. With these losses, the failure of the campaign ended any hope of making an attack for the remainder of the year. In addition the core of the English Catholics did not rise up in rebellion even when the Spanish fleet offshore was known to them, in fact many had even spoken out in support of fighting them. King Philip according to the Spanish commanders had more trust in God than in preparation. Padilla was so angered at the lack of preparation that he said to the Spanish King:

If your majesty decides on an attempt on England, take care to make preparations in good quantity and in good time and if not then it is better to make peace.

— Martín de Padilla to the King

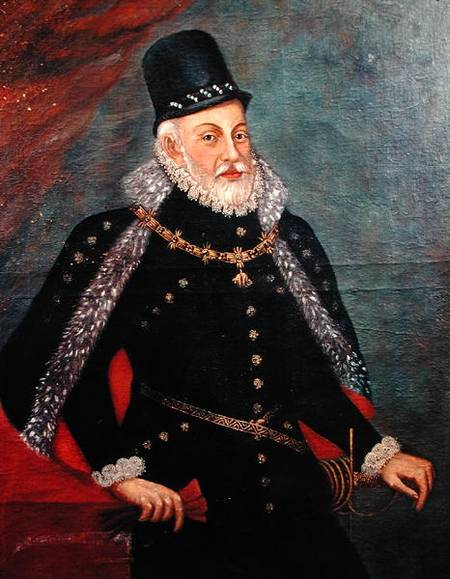
Philip II of Spain

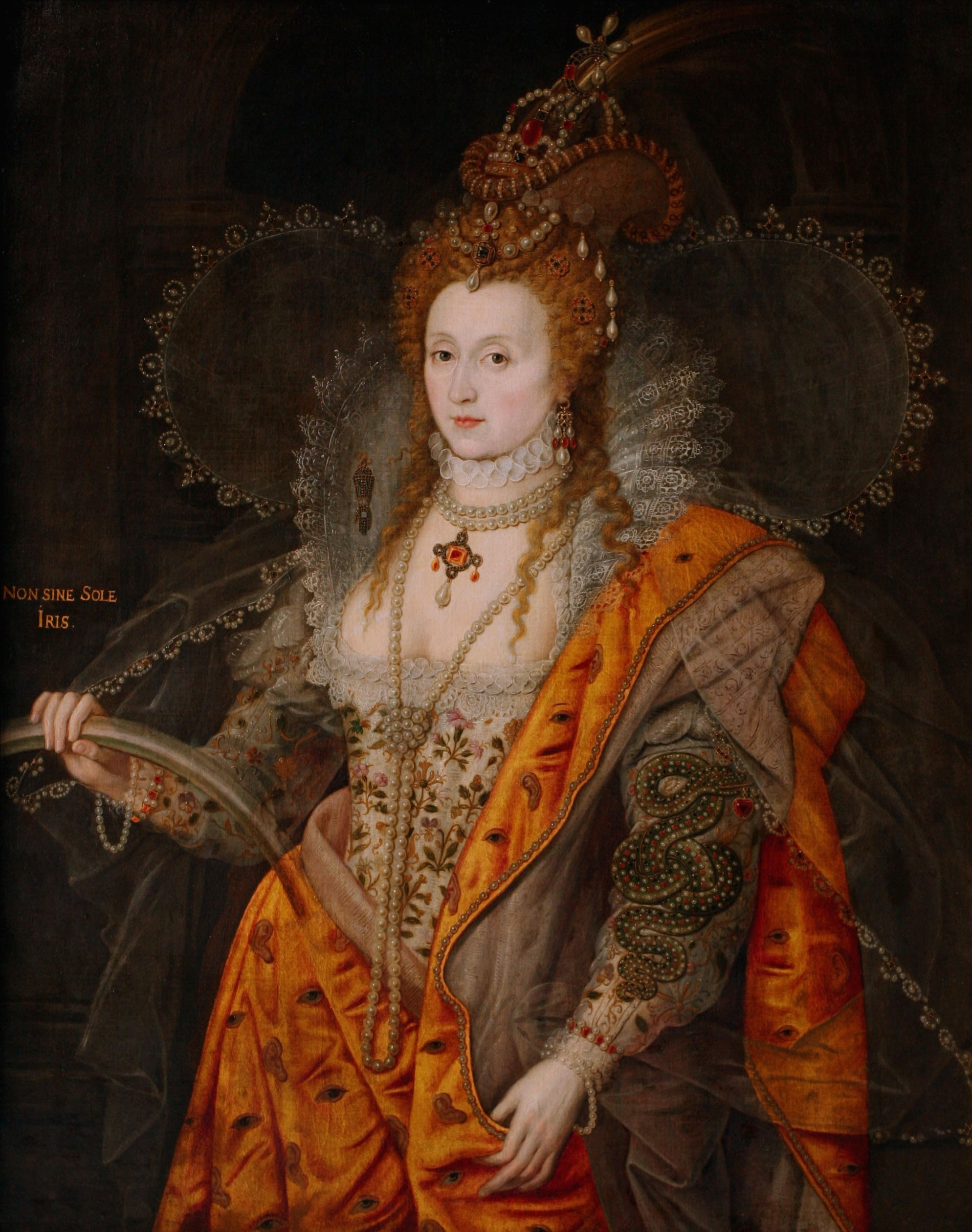
Elizabeth I of England

The Spanish king was distraught by the news and he knew there was no possibility a third attack by an armada could be attempted. He afterwards fell ill, went into a palsy, and shut himself away in his palace. Bonfires and processions all over Spain were lit in the hope of his health returning. Before he was taken ill, Philip had decided that he only wanted peace. His health did not improve and he resultingly died the following year.

For the English, and in particular Queen Elizabeth, it was more about luck as to how England had been saved. However, she was displeased with Essex by the fact that the Azores expedition was a failure as well as leaving England's coastline defenceless. The English had obtained vital information from the captured Spanish ships and prisoners. They were able to learn what was happening, including the objectives and overall strategy of the Spanish Armada as a whole within a few days, whilst the ships were off the English and Welsh coasts. Howard on his return was rewarded soon after by the Queen and was created Earl of Nottingham.

Lessons were learned, however, in particular at Falmouth, where Mountjoy's consultant military engineer Paul Ivey was responsible for strengthening the castles at St Mawes and Pendennis. These were put into immediate effect – information from prisoners claimed that an invasion would be attempted the following summer but only if the taking of Falmouth or Milford had succeeded. This was confirmed by an English spy in Spain who commented on the Spanish confusion and misfortune in the aftermath but "bragged about what they would do next Spring". Plymouth and Milford Haven's defences were also improved as well as militia units trained in the art of war. In all, two companies of English foot soldiers from the Low countries had been in place in Cornwall. English troops from France on standby returned there to fight with Henry IV in Brittany at the closing of the Franco-Spanish war before the Peace of Vervins was signed.

The Spanish would never again try sending a large naval armada directed at England. The cost had almost been ruinous to Spain and nearly bankrupted the country's finances again. It was not as bad as the previous year's failure, however, since gold and silver bullion was still arriving in quantity from the Americas. The insurmountable debt rose and soon after the campaign there was a further arrangement to clear it.

The new King Philip III in 1598 would be more cautious. Under the advisement of Don Francisco Gómez de Sandoval, 1st Duke of Lerma he would try one more attempt. The final Armada was sent in 1601 in support of Irish clans under Hugh O'Neill against English rule. Although smaller -33 ships with 4,500 men, the Armada led by Juan del Águila and Pedro de Zubiaur succeeded in landing, after a severe storm again nearly put paid to the operation. This venture too ended in disaster when the entire Spanish force capitulated after their defeat at the Battle of Kinsale.

The failure of the armadas thus ceded the naval initiative to England who were still able to launch expeditions to Spain without much hindrance. For the first time in English naval history, effective offshore blockades were launched with expeditions such as one led by William Monson and Richard Leveson most notably off Sesimbra in 1602. They could also defend the Channel when some months later a Spanish fleet of Galleys was defeated by an Anglo-Dutch force. It was only until peace was settled that Spain could spare any harm on its colonies and its merchant ships from England's seas dogs.

== Legacy ==
In 1953 during the coronation of Queen Elizabeth II, in Aberdyfi a local ship was fitted out to represent the Spanish caravel The Bear of Amsterdam. She was moored mid-river and set on fire. A restaurant in the same town is also named after the ship.

== Miscellany ==
- The events are the plot of the historical novel, The Grove of Eagles by Winston Graham

== See also ==
- Spanish Armada
- English Armada
- Invisible armada
- Fourth Spanish Armada

== Bibliography ==
- Bardon, Jonathan (2008). A History of Ireland in 250 Episodes: A Sweeping Single Narrative of Irish History from the End of the Ice Age to the Peace Settlement in Northern Ireland. Gill & Macmillan Ltd. ISBN 9780717157549.
- Barratt, John (2005). Armada 1588: The Spanish Assault on England. Pen & Sword Books. ISBN 9781844153237.
- Bicheno, Hugh (2012). Elizabeth's Sea Dogs: How England's Mariners Became the Scourge of the Seas. Conway. ISBN 9781844861743.
- Cruz, Anne J (2008). Material and Symbolic Circulation Between Spain and England, 1554–1604. Ashgate Publishing. ISBN 9780754662150.
- Duerloo, Luc (2012). Dynasty and Piety: Archduke Albert (1598–1621) and Habsburg Political Culture in an Age of Religious Wars. Ashgate Publishing, Ltd. ISBN 9781409443759.
- Ekin, Des (2014). The Last Armada: Siege of 100 Days: Kinsale 1601. The O'Brien Press. ISBN 9781847176998.
- Elton, G.R (2012). England Under the Tudors. Routledge. ISBN 9781136786600.
- Fitzpatrick, Joan (2004). Shakespeare, Spenser and the Contours of Britain: Reshaping the Atlantic Archipelago. Univ of Hertfordshire Press. ISBN 9781902806372.
- Goodman, David (2003). Spanish Naval Power, 1589–1665: Reconstruction and Defeat. Cambridge University Press. ISBN 9780521522571.
- Glete, Jan (2002). Warfare at Sea, 1500–1650: Maritime Conflicts and the Transformation of Europe. Routledge. ISBN 9781134610785.
- Graham, Winston (2013). The Spanish Armadas. Pan Macmillan. ISBN 9781447256847.
- Hammer, Paul E. J. (1999). The Polarisation of Elizabethan Politics: The Political Career of Robert Devereux, 2nd Earl of Essex, 1585–1597. Cambridge University Press. ISBN 9780521434850.
- Hammer, Paul E. J. (2003). Elizabeth's Wars: War, Government and Society in Tudor England, 1544–1604. Palgrave Macmillan. ISBN 9781137173386.
- Harrison, G.B (2013). A Second Elizabethan Journal, Volume 2. Routledge. ISBN 9781136355578.
- Hernon, Ian (2013). Fortress Britain: All the Invasions and Incursions Since 1066. The History Press. ISBN 9780752497174.
- Highley, Christopher (1997). Shakespeare, Spenser, and the Crisis in Ireland. Cambridge University Press. ISBN 9780521581998.
- Hume, Martin (2004). Treason and Plot: Struggles for Catholic Supremacy in the Last Years of Queen Elizabeth. Kessinger Publishing. ISBN 9781417947133.
- Innes, A.D (2012). England under the Tudors. Amazon (Kindle). ISBN 9781176595903.
- Kamen, Henry (1997). Philip of Spain. Yale University Press. ISBN 9780300078008.
- Loades, David (2012). The Tudors: History of a Dynasty. A&C Black. ISBN 9781441136909.
- MacCaffrey, Wallace T (1994). Elizabeth I: War and Politics, 1588–1603. Princeton Paperbacks Princeton University Press. ISBN 9780691036519.
- McCoog, Thomas M (2012). The Society of Jesus in Ireland, Scotland, and England, 1589–1597: Building the Faith of Saint Peter Upon the King of Spain's Monarchy. Ashgate & Institutum Historicum Societatis Iesu. ISBN 9781409437727.
- Nelson, Arthur (2001). The Tudor Navy: The Ships, Men and Organisation, 1485–1603. Conway Maritime Press. ISBN 9780851777856.
- Nolan, Cathal J (2006). The Age of Wars of Religion, 1000–1650: An Encyclopaedia of Global Warfare and Civilization, Volume 2. Greenwood Publishing Group. ISBN 9780313337345.
- Palmer, William (1994). The Problem of Ireland in Tudor Foreign Policy, 1485–1603. Boydell & Brewer Ltd. ISBN 9780851155623.
- Pattison, Paul (2009). Pendennis Castle and St Mawes Castle. English Heritage. ISBN 9781848020221.
- Taunton, Nina (2001). 1590s Drama and Militarism: Portrayals of War in Marlowe, Chapman and Shakespeare's Henry V. Ashgate. ISBN 9780754602743.
- Thackeray, Frank W; Findling, John E, eds. (2012). Events That Formed the Modern World: From the European Renaissance through the War on Terror. ABC-CLIO. ISBN 9781598849028.
- Wernham, R.B. (1994). The Return of the Armadas: The Last Years of the Elizabethan Wars Against Spain 1595–1603. Oxford: Clarendon Press. ISBN 978-0198204435.
- Williams, Glanmor (1993). Renewal and Reformation: Wales C. 1415-1642 Volume 3 of History of Wales History of Wales, Vol 3. Oxford University Press. ISBN 9780192852779.
- Wilson, Peter Hamish (2009). The Thirty Years War: Europe's Tragedy. Harvard University Press. ISBN 9780674036345.

Journals

- The Historian, Historical Association, 1996
