= The Armada (band) =

Three-piece rock band based in Ireland

- Wayne Sheehy, Gareth Forsyth, and Jeff Martin

Background information
- Origin: Cork, Ireland
- Genres: Hard rock, world music, blues
- Years active: 2008–2010
- Label: Kingdom
- Members: Jeff Martin; Wayne Sheehy; Jay Cortez
- Past members: Gareth Forsyth
- Website: thearmada.com

The Armada were a three-piece rock band based in Cork, Ireland fronted by Jeff Martin, formerly of The Tea Party. The band was formed when Jeff Martin and Wayne Sheehy met in an Irish pub. The two hit it off immediately and soon started making music together.

The name of the band refers to the Spanish Armada:

"We were like, what is this?" [Jeff Martin] said. "It's massive, but what do we make of this?" That's when Sheehy commented, "It's kind of like the Spanish Armada . . . attacking you from all fronts."

On 27 September 2008, Gareth Forsyth was announced as the band's touring bassist/keyboardist through the band's MySpace. Their debut album, The Armada, was released through the Kingdom Records website on 4 November 2008.

By 2009, after Sheehy moved to Perth to join Martin and prepare for a tour, Jay Cortez was the band's bass player, playing his first show in the band on 1 July 2009. Sheehy announced on Facebook in September 2010 that he left the band after its first tour, but stayed involved due to the release of the Live at WOMadelaide 2010 DVD. In 2010 Martin formed Jeff Martin 777, with Cortez and Malcolm Clark on drums, and The Armada effectively ended.

== Members ==
- Jeff Martin – vocals, guitar
- Wayne Sheehy – drums
- Jay Cortez – bass

== Discography ==
- The Armada (2008)
- Live at WOMadelaide 2010 (2010)
