= Second Spanish Armada =

Fleet of Spanish ships, intended to attack England in 1596

- Part of the Anglo-Spanish War
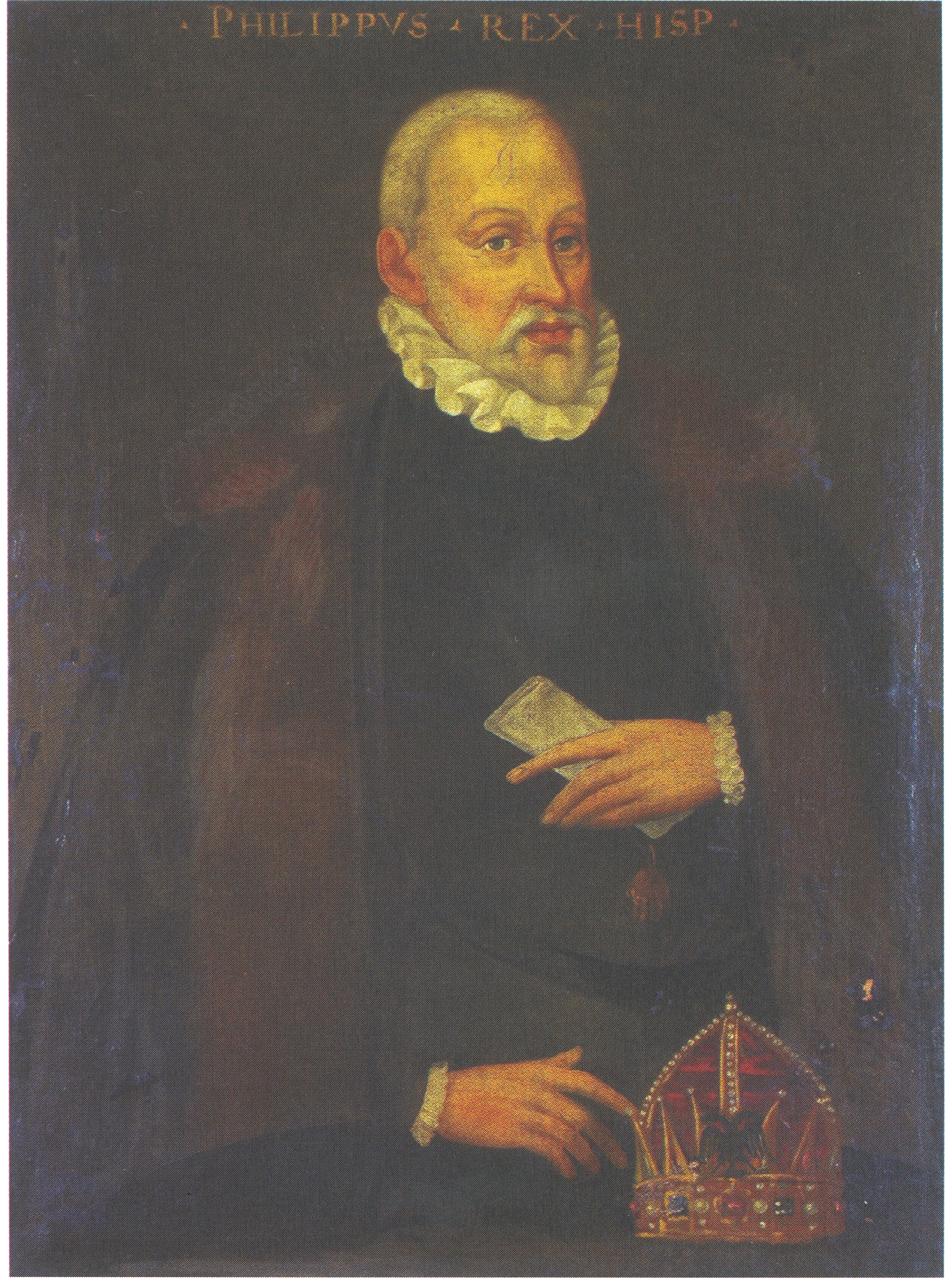
- Philip II of Spain in his old age, ordered the Armada of 1596 in revenge for the English attack on Cádiz
Date	24 October – 1 November 1596
Location	Cape Finisterre, Atlantic
Result	English victory

Belligerents
Spain	England

Commanders and leaders
(Spain) Philip II (Spain) Martín de Padilla (Spain) Diego Brochero (Spain) Sancho Martínez de Leyva (Spain) Carlos de Arellano	(England) Elizabeth I (England) Robert Devereux (England) Charles Howard (England) Walter Raleigh

Strength
Fleet; 24 galleons 53 armed merchant ships Total; 126 - 140 ships 19,500 men (approx.)	Various shore defences 13 galleons 74 armed merchant vessels 12,000 men

Casualties and losses
1 Flyboat captured Storms/Disease: 5 galleons sunk 38 other ships sunk or scuttled 5,000 dead	Unknown

The Second Spanish Armada also known as the Spanish Armada of 1596 was a naval operation that took place during the Anglo–Spanish War. Another invasion of England or Ireland was attempted in the autumn of 1596 by King Philip II of Spain. In an attempt at revenge for the English sack of Cádiz in 1596, Philip immediately ordered a counter strike in the hope of assisting the Irish rebels in rebellion against the English crown. The strategy was to open a new front in the war, forcing English troops away from France and the Netherlands, where they were also fighting.

The Armada under the command of the Adelantado, Martín de Padilla was gathered at Lisbon, Vigo and Seville and set off in October. Before it had left Spanish waters, storms struck the fleet off Cape Finisterre. The storms shattered the Armada causing much damage and forcing the ships to return to their home ports. Nearly 5,000 men died either from the storm or disease and 38 ships were lost, which was enough for a long-term postponement of the Irish enterprise. The material and financial losses added to the bankruptcy of the Spanish kingdom, during the autumn of 1596.

== Background ==
Spain and England had been at war for nearly twelve years, with neither side gaining the upper hand. The result of the intervention of Philip II in the religious war in France in support of the Catholic League, meant that Spanish forces had established coastal garrisons along the French and Flemish coast by the late 1580s. These bases had a huge strategic value because they allowed England to be threatened by the Spanish fleet and troops. England, on the other hand, had also intervened in France, but in support of King Henry IV of France, as a result of the Treaty of Greenwich in 1591. The Spanish had captured Calais in 1596, which meant that a strike against England was potentially more achievable. After desperate French demands to keep her from signing peace with Spain, the English signed the Triple Alliance with the Dutch Republic and France.

England had sent an armada under Robert Devereux and Charles Howard to Cádiz, which was captured, sacked and held for two weeks in the summer of 1596. Philip soon after took into consideration the defence of the peninsula but most of all sought revenge even if it meant selling everything he had.

The leading English Jesuit exile in Spain, Robert Persons, went to an audience with Philip, hoping to take advantage of the situation in trying to get the King to act. Persons argued for a winter attack when the Queen would least expect it. This meant an army of moderate size rather than a vast Armada that would give away the element of surprise, in which Persons referenced the failed Spanish Armada in 1588.

Persons noted that the point of entry for the Spanish would have been from Scotland, Kent, or Milford Haven in Wales, citing that Henry VII had successfully invaded from there in 1485. Here it was believed the Spaniards would find a vast reservoir of Catholic support. Detailed charts on the ports of England and Wales had been drawn up. Other plans suggested occupying the Isle of Wight. A number of the King's advisers however saw an invasion of Ireland as a better way to destabilize England. The use of Ireland as a springboard for a new invasion was nothing new. Marquis of Santa Cruz, the first commander of the Spanish Armada, had advocated landing in Cork or Wexford in 1586. The plan was only scrapped because of the delays caused by Drake's raid on Cádiz the following year.

Philip began by ordering Martín de Padilla, the Count of Santa Gadea, the Adelantado to assemble a new fleet intending to land on Ireland in the hope of increasing the rebellion under Hugh O'Neill, Earl of Tyrone. As early as 1595, O'Neill and Hugh Roe O'Donnell wrote to Philip for help and offered to be his vassals. They also proposed that Philip's cousin Archduke Albert be made Prince of Ireland, but nothing came of this. In January 1596, Philip replied encouraging them to keep their faith in their Catholic religion, Spanish intervention and not to make peace with Elizabeth. For the Spanish the strategy was simple – the war in Ireland would create a new front, hoping to draw English troops away from the fighting in the United Provinces, and from which the English would have to fight. In Spain's eyes, the English fighting on this new front was one they could not afford to do.

== Armada ==
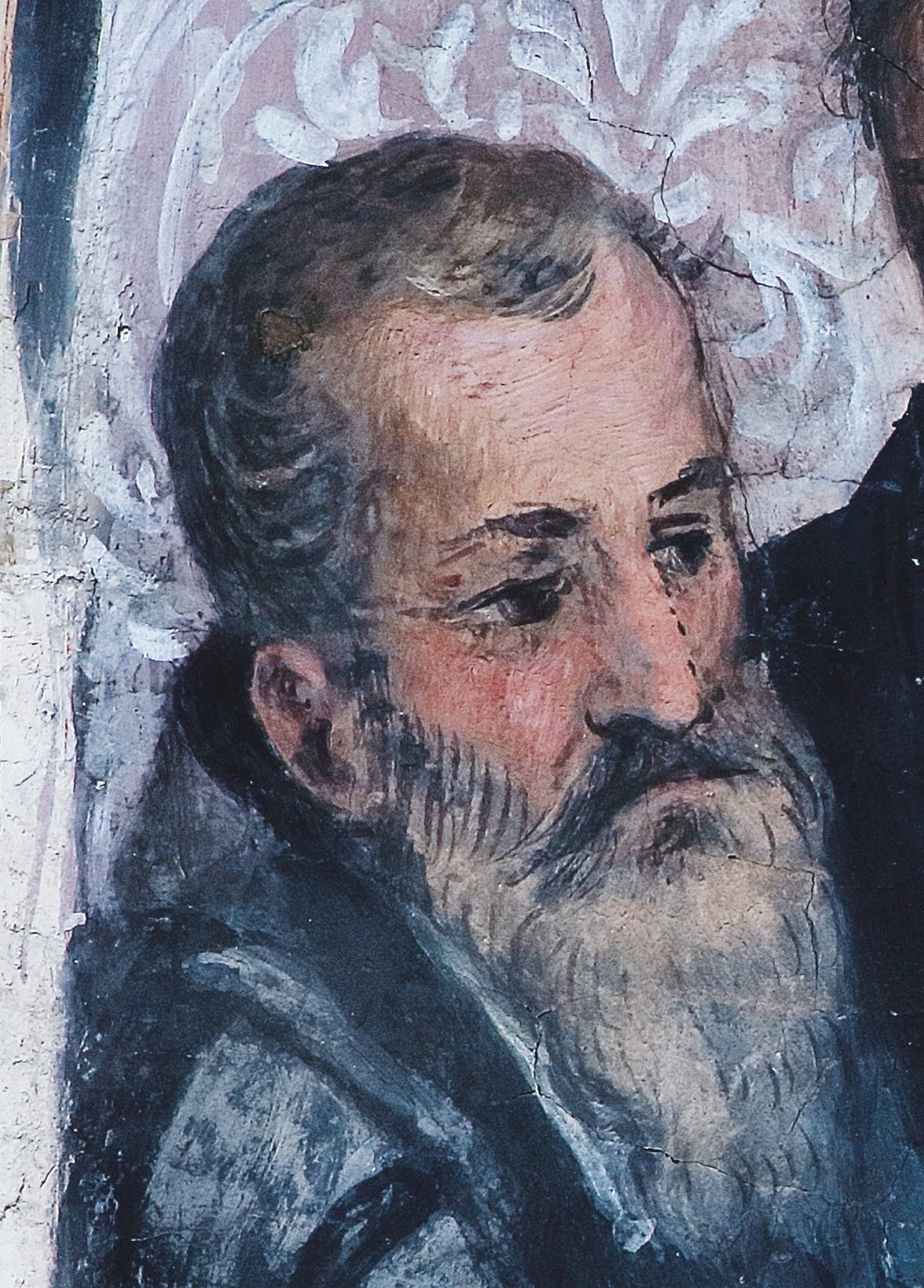
Hugh O'Neill, Earl of Tyrone

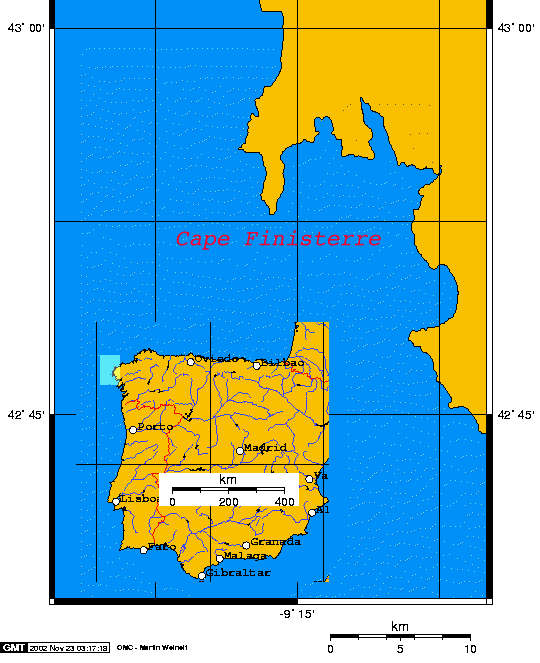
Location of Cape Finisterre

Philip II placed great hope in the new Grand Armada that was being organised in Lisbon. There were fifteen galleons from Castile and nine from Portugal, 53 Flemish and German boats which had been impounded, six pinnaces and one caravel, with 10,790 men. From Seville 2,500 troops would depart in 30 flyboats to join the fleet in Lisbon. In the north, at Vigo, a further 41 vessels of various tonnage were waiting, with around 6,000 men. The Adelantado's total force consisted of 11,000 badly furnished and sick infantry and 3,000 cavalry, in addition to the sailors which numbered 5,500.

Besides the Adelantado the principal leaders were Carlos de Arellano, Major-general Sancho Martínez de Leyva and General Admiral Diego Brochero. Rumours were rife and long before its actual departure, reports were reaching the Spanish authorities of the disembarkation of their troops in O'Neill's territory. In Lisbon Cornelius O'Mulrian followed with intense interest the preparations of the new armada. According to the reports the nuncio was sending to Rome, the invasion of Ireland was imminent. He wished to dispatch O'Mulrian, together with many Jesuits and other priests to organise the Catholic restoration in Ireland.

In July, the Earl of Essex had been fed reports from spies and merchants that there were forty-six ships in Lisbon and that new warships were being built at many places on the Biscay coast. This information was conveyed to Queen Elizabeth, but she was informed that it would not strike because of the expected autumn storms. Nevertheless, preparations were made and the Navy was put on alert. Reinforcements arrived to protect the Isle of Wight, Falmouth and even the mouth of the Medway where at Chatham the English fleet lay in dock. The English field commander Lord Willoughby's main anxiety, however, was for Ireland, Scotland, and the English held Dutch Cautionary Towns such as Vlissingen.

At the beginning of October, the Armada was still in no shape to depart. Lack of food and money as well as potential mutiny forcibly delayed the expedition, which infuriated Philip. The Adelantado had preparation for the Armada as his main priority but soon asked to be relieved of his command to defend himself, which Philip refused. Philip instead abruptly cancelled the Irish enterprise altogether. The relenting weather, lateness of the season and disease amongst ship crews were the reasons. The Adelantado instead was to sail to La Coruna, where he was to be given orders to seize the French Port of Brest, which they had briefly held in 1594 only to be defeated by Anglo French troops who took the fort there. Brest was chosen simply because it was closer to Spain but also could be used as a base to attack England and also to help the Irish rebels.

=== Execution ===
The weather finally relented on the morning of 24 October permitting the Armada, numbering eighty-one ships, to depart the harbour of Lisbon. The fleet along with the army set sail from Lisbon on 25 October, heading towards La Coruña and sailed in safety as far as Viana do Castelo where they had to anchor and wait for a wind. When the wind came, they neared Cape Finisterre, the land's end at the north-west of the Spanish peninsula. It was to be their furthest point and almost immediately they encountered an unexpected storm. The rest of the ships that succeeded in weathering the Cape were scattered into the ports of the Bay of Biscay, many battered beyond repair. The whole Spanish force had ceased to exist as an effective fighting fleet. Forty battered vessels managed to turn back and enter the port of Ferrol, including the Adelantado in the flagship San Pablo.

By 1 November, what remained of the fleet had returned and the cost was counted. The Adelantado informed the court of the disaster, much to Philip's sadness.

Meanwhile, reports of the Armada having sailed began to filter in England, but also that a rumour from Ireland was that one thousand five hundred Spanish had landed, with the whole island in revolt. Charles Howard sent out a powerful fleet which included thirteen galleons, to find the dismembered remainders of the Armada but found only floating wreckage and bodies. A Spanish flyboat, however, was captured along with 200 of her crew and from this the knowledge and extent of the Armada was then discovered.

None of the Spanish ships ever made it to the English Channel and as a result Brest, Ireland and England had been spared a major assault.

== Aftermath ==
At first the damage appeared to be minimal and Philip hoped that once the Adelantado had reassembled the ships, he could continue his voyage, but as time passed the enormity of the disaster became apparent. Losses to the Armada at Ferrol were significant. There was general confusion and sadness at the disaster. In mid-November the nuncio sent a sorrowful summary of the facts: thirty vessels were missing, thirteen had crashed into the reefs and there were many dead from the Portuguese upper class. Eighteen of the sunken ships were embargoed hulks, whose loss could easily be replaced, but five of the King's principal ships known as the Apostles had perished. The worst loss was the 900-ton galleon Santiago, which had carried 330 soldiers as well as sailors, of whom only twenty-three survived. Disease had ravaged the ships ever since they had been at port. These could not be replaced so easily and there were few survivors in others. In all, nearly 5,000 men either perished in shipwrecks or were dead or sick with disease.

As the magnitude of the disaster became more fully known, Philip reluctantly cancelled the enterprise on 13 November. The disaster was ruinous in terms of finance as the ships La Capitana de Levante and Santiago, each transporting the paychests of 30,000 ducats, were lost. The Armada was to winter in Spain and to depart the following spring, without further diversions or postponements. A great fear then gripped Galicia in January 1597 that the English navy would possibly show up at any moment, a situation similar to that in 1589. The Armada was rebuilt in Ferrol with the help of replacement artillery and monies recovered from the shipwrecks. The Spanish authorities were more concerned with defending the peninsula.

The shock of the disaster reverberated into every corner of Philip's dominions, loosening everywhere the frayed bonds of his system and threatening to complete what Essex's successful Cádiz campaign had left undone. After the defeat at Cádiz, bankruptcy had stared the King of Spain in the face and in the aftermath of the Armada, he was forced to suspend payment to creditors. Philip had declared the third major bankruptcy of his reign. The King desperately wanted only a postponement of the Armada, not an abandonment and was obliged to borrow more money but this time from his Italian holdings.

The Irish leaders in exile continued to believe that the Armada was bound for Ireland. A year later, another attempt would be made. This time, after so many changes in strategy, it was on England, with the addition of destroying the English fleet returning from the failed Islands Voyage. The Armada of 1597 in the autumn was executed and despite encountering a storm which scattered the fleet, some managed to reach and in some cases land troops in Cornwall and Wales. With the majority of the fleet scattered and little cohesion between ships, the Adelantado ordered the fleet to retreat to Spain, losing a number of ships to the returning English fleet they had failed to destroy.

== See also ==
- Spanish Armada
- 3rd Spanish Armada
- English Armada
- 4th Spanish Armada

== Bibliography ==
- Bicheno, Hugh (2012). Elizabeth's Sea Dogs: How England's Mariners Became the Scourge of the Seas. Conway. ISBN 978-1844861743.
- Childs, David (2009). Tudor Sea Power: The Foundation of Greatness. Seaforth Publishing. ISBN 978-1473819924.
- Hammer, Paul E. J. (2003). Elizabeth's Wars: War, Government and Society in Tudor England, 1544–1604. Palgrave Macmillan. ISBN 978-1137173386.
- Hume, Martin (2004). Treason and Plot: Struggles for Catholic Supremacy in the Last Years of Queen Elizabeth. Kessinger Publishing. ISBN 978-1417947133.
- Kamen, Henry (1997). Philip of Spain. Yale University Press. ISBN 978-0300078008.
- Mattingly, Garrett (2000). The Defeat of the Spanish Armada. Pimlico (3rd Ed). ISBN 978-0712666275.
- MacCaffrey, Wallace T. (1994). Elizabeth I: War and Politics, 1588–1603. Princeton University Press. ISBN 978-0691036519.
- McCoog, Thomas M. (2012). The Society of Jesus in Ireland, Scotland, and England, 1589–1597: Building the Faith of Saint Peter Upon the King of Spain's Monarchy. Ashgate & Institutum Historicum Societatis Iesu. ISBN 978-1409437727.
- Morgan, Hiram (2004). The Battle of Kinsale. Wordwell Ltd. ISBN 1869857704.
- Richardson, Glenn; Doran, Susan, eds. (2005). Tudor England and its Neighbours. Palgrave Macmillan. ISBN 978-1137155337.
- Simpson, William (2001). The Reign of Elizabeth Heinemann advanced history. Heinemann (publisher). ISBN 978-0435327354.
- Wernham, R.B. (1994). The Return of the Armadas: The Last Years of the Elizabethan Wars Against Spain 1595–1603. Oxford: Clarendon Press. ISBN 978-0198204435.
