= Siege of Sluis =

The siege of Sluis or Battle of Sluis may refer to:

- Siege of Sluis (1587), a siege and conquest of Sluis by Spanish royal general Alexander Farnese, Duke of Parma
- Battle of Sluis (1603), a naval battle between a Spanish royal and a Dutch rebel fleet
- Siege of Sluis (1604), a siege and conquest of Sluis by Dutch rebel general Maurice of Nassau
