= Joos de Moor =

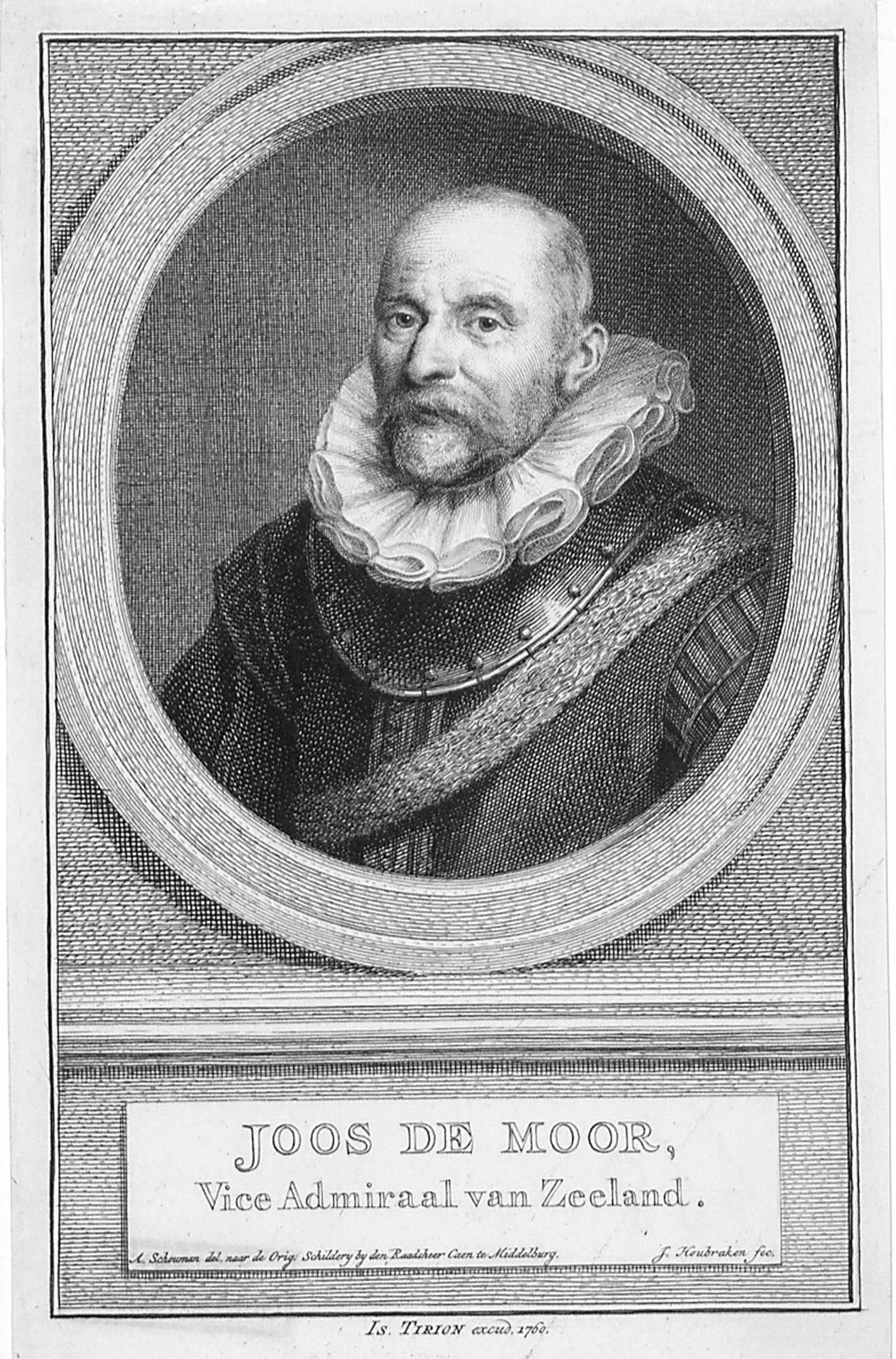

Joos de Moor (1548 or 1558 – 18 February 1618) was a Dutch Vice Admiral of Zeeland from the 16th century. In 1603, in the Battle of Sluis he defeated a Spanish fleet under Admiral Federico Spinola. He was the son of Jan de Moor, first vice-admiral of Zeeland. He was married to Dina Crins (ca. 1562–1583), Janneken Ingels (ca. 1564–1604), and Catarina Struvingts (ca 1563-1613). He died at Vlissingen and is buried in the St James the Great Church.
