= Vlissingen =

Municipality in Zeeland, Netherlands

Vlissingen Vlissienge (Zeeuws) Flushing
- Municipality
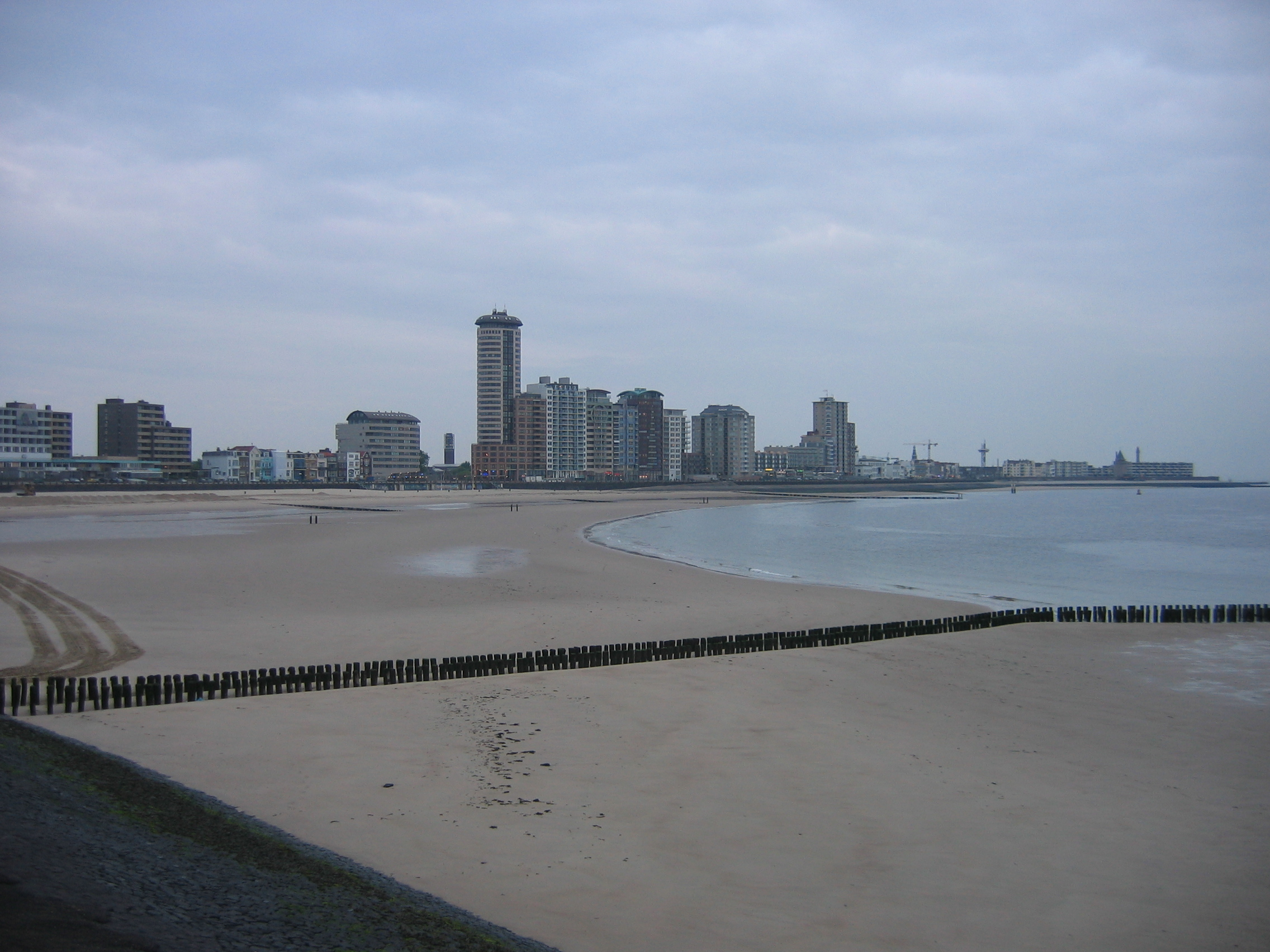
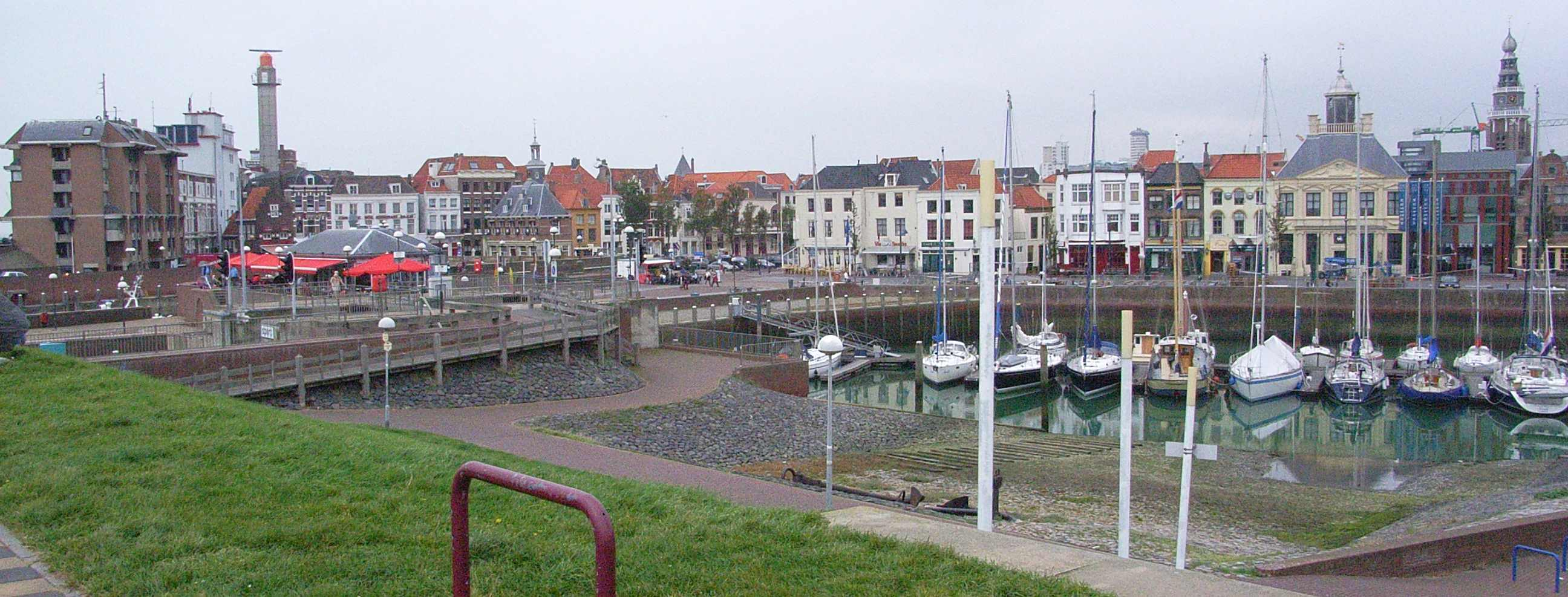
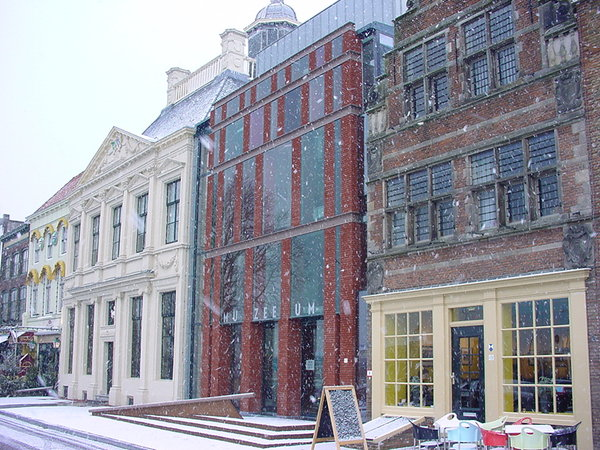
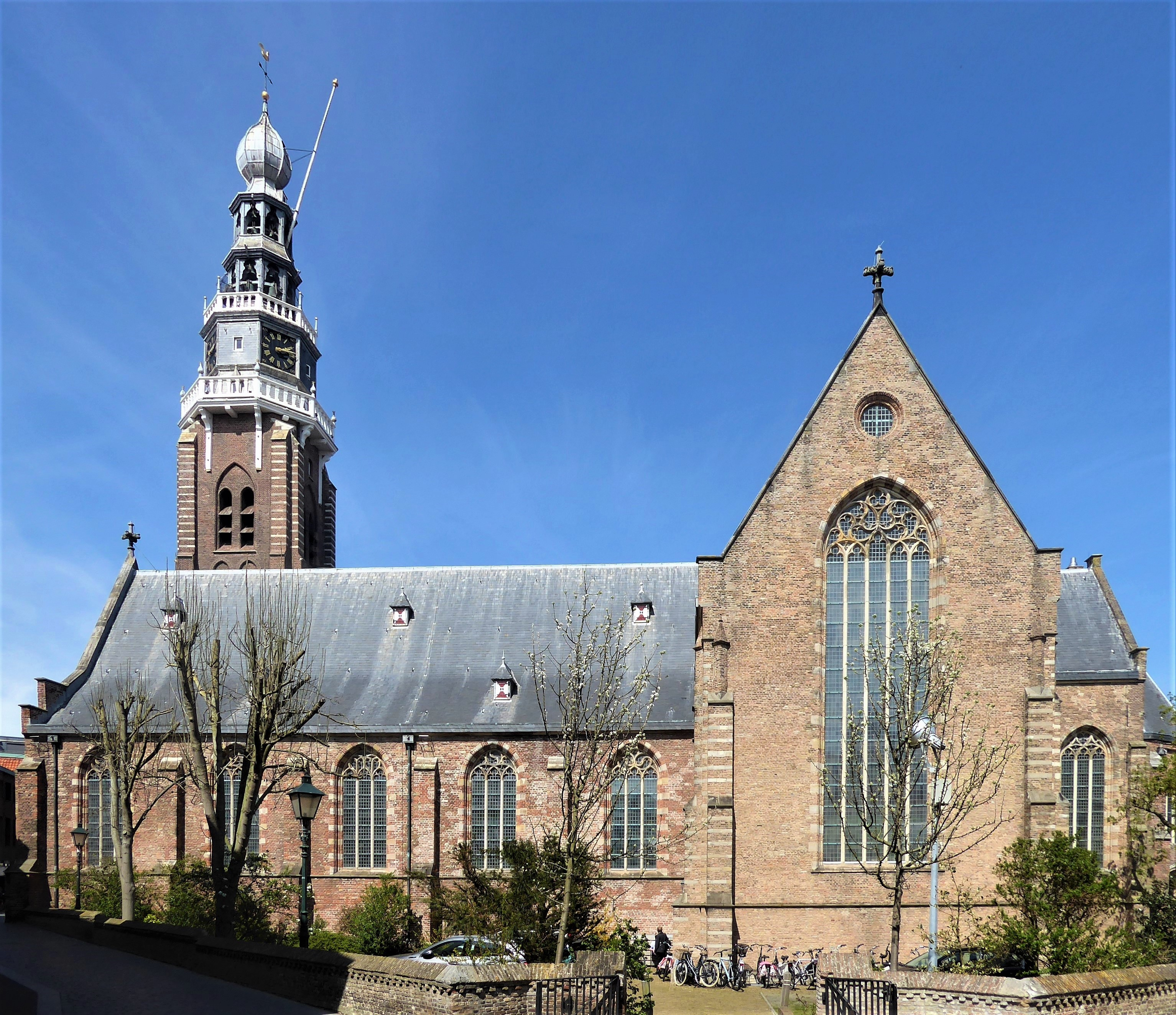
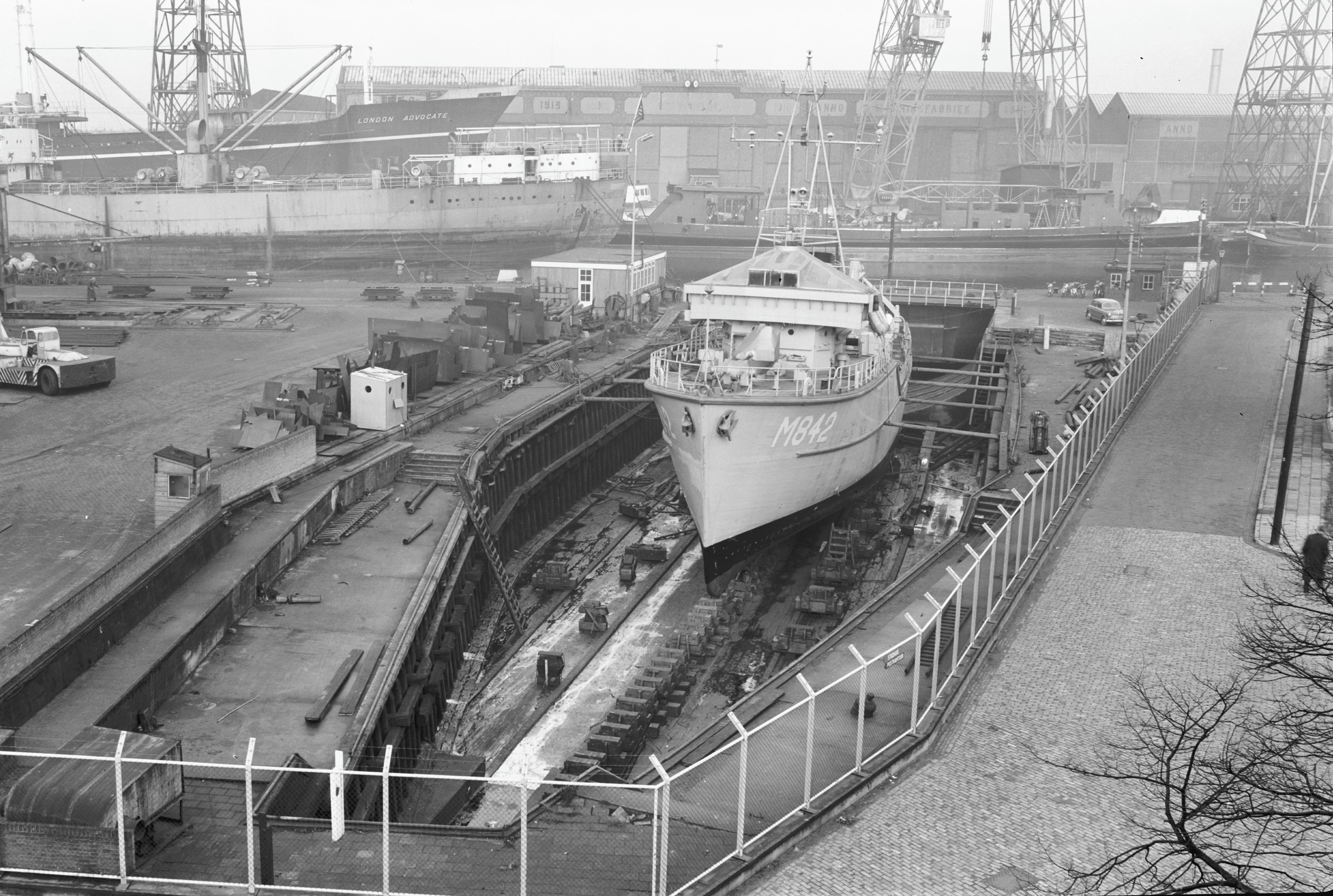
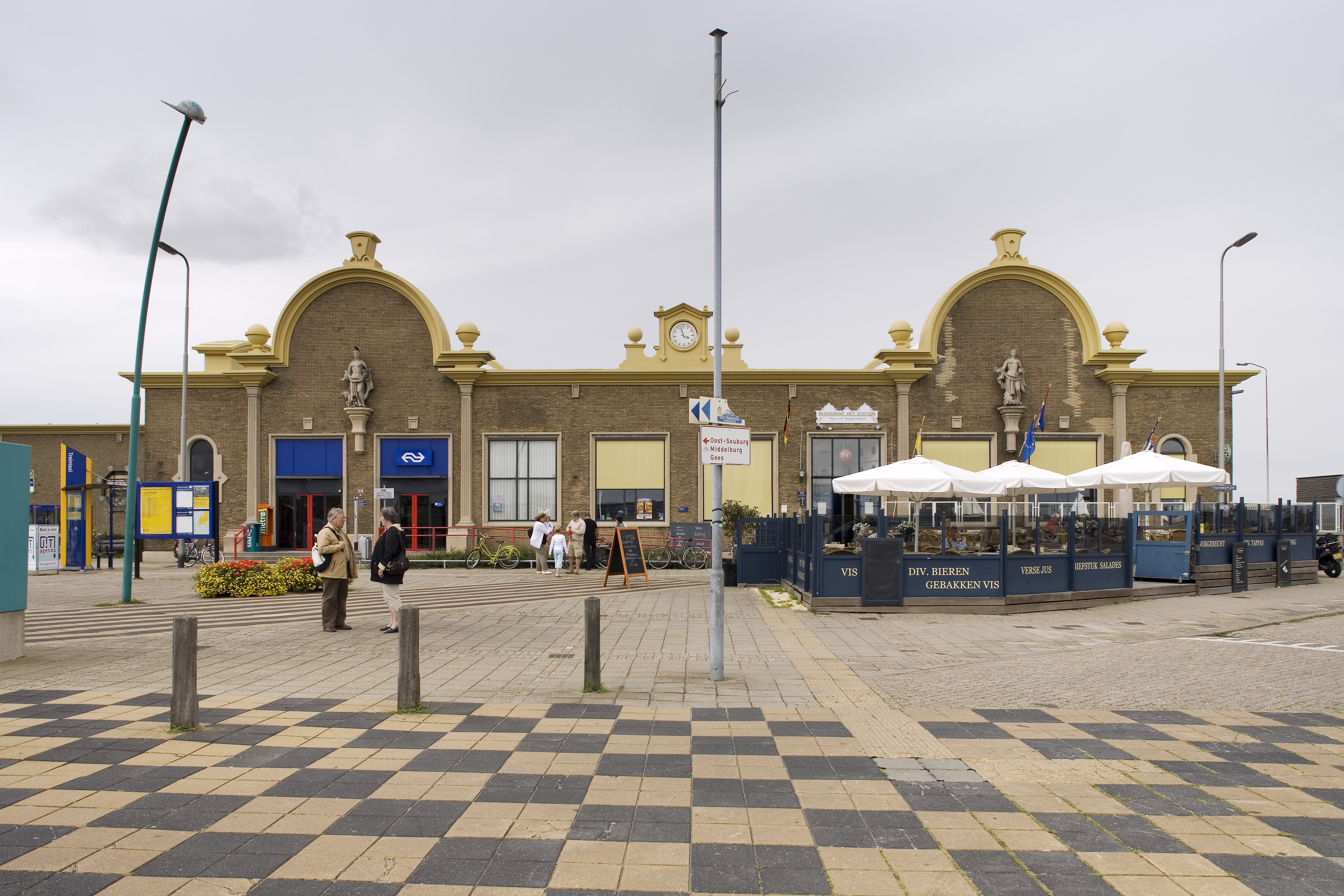
- Boulevard with beach Harbour Zeeuws Maritiem muZEEum St James the Great Church Vlissingen Navy Drydock Railway station

- Flag Coat of arms

- Location in Zeeland

- Location within the Netherlands Location within Europe
- Coordinates: 51°27′N 3°34′E
- Country: Netherlands
- Province: Zeeland
- Boroughs: 8 Districts: Binnenstad; Middengebied; Paauwenburg-Westduin; Lammerenburg; Oost-Souburg; Ritthem; Binnen- en Buitenhavens; Sloegebied

Government
  - Body: Municipal council
  - Mayor: Bas van den Tillaar (CDA)

Area
  - Total: 344.84 km^{2} (133.14 sq mi)
  - Land: 34.31 km^{2} (13.25 sq mi)
  - Water: 310.53 km^{2} (119.90 sq mi)
- Elevation: 1 m (3.3 ft)

Population (January 2021)
  - Total: 44,358
  - Density: 1,293/km^{2} (3,350/sq mi)
- Demonym: Vlissinger
- Time zone: UTC+1 (CET)
  - Summer (DST): UTC+2 (CEST)
- Postcode: 4380–4389
- Area code: 0118
- Website: vlissingen.nl

Vlissingen (Dutch: [ˈvlɪsɪŋə(n)]; Zeelandic: Vlissienge) is a municipality and a city in the southwestern Netherlands on the island of Walcheren. With its strategic location between the Scheldt river and the North Sea, Vlissingen has been an important harbour for centuries. It was granted city rights in 1315. In the 17th century the roadstead of Vlissingen was a main harbour for ships of the Dutch East India Company (VOC). It is also known as the birthplace of Lieutenant-Admiral Michiel de Ruyter.

Vlissingen is mainly noted for the yards on the Scheldt where most of the ships of the Royal Netherlands Navy (Koninklijke Marine) are built.

== Geography ==
The municipality of Vlissingen consists of the following places:

- City: Vlissingen
- Villages: Oost-Souburg, Ritthem, and West-Souburg
- Hamlet: Groot-Abeele

== History ==
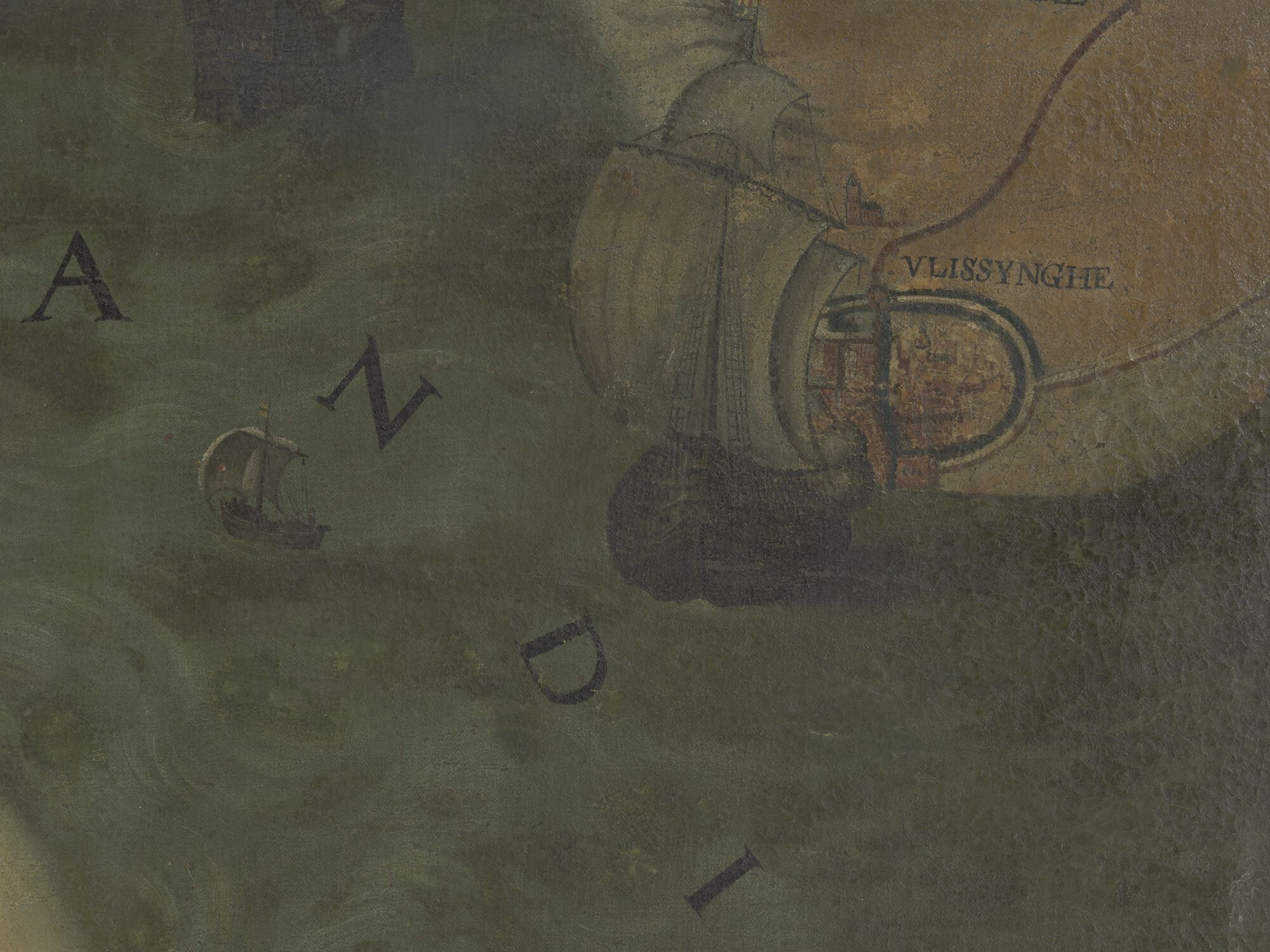
Vlissingen during the Spanish occupation depicted on the Kaart van het Brugse Vrije by Pieter Pourbus, 1571

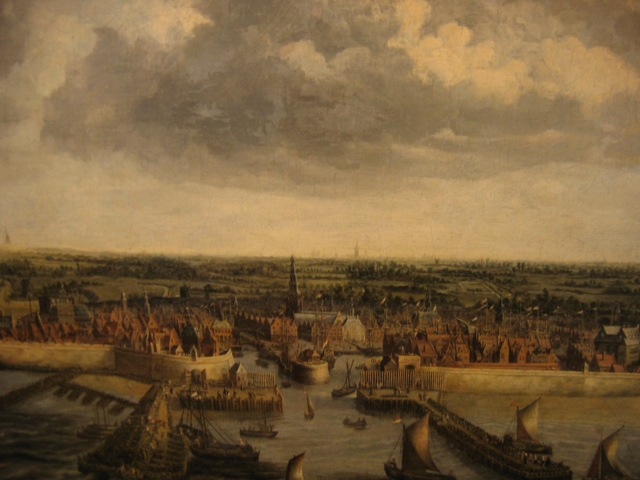
Vlissingen from the sea, 1662

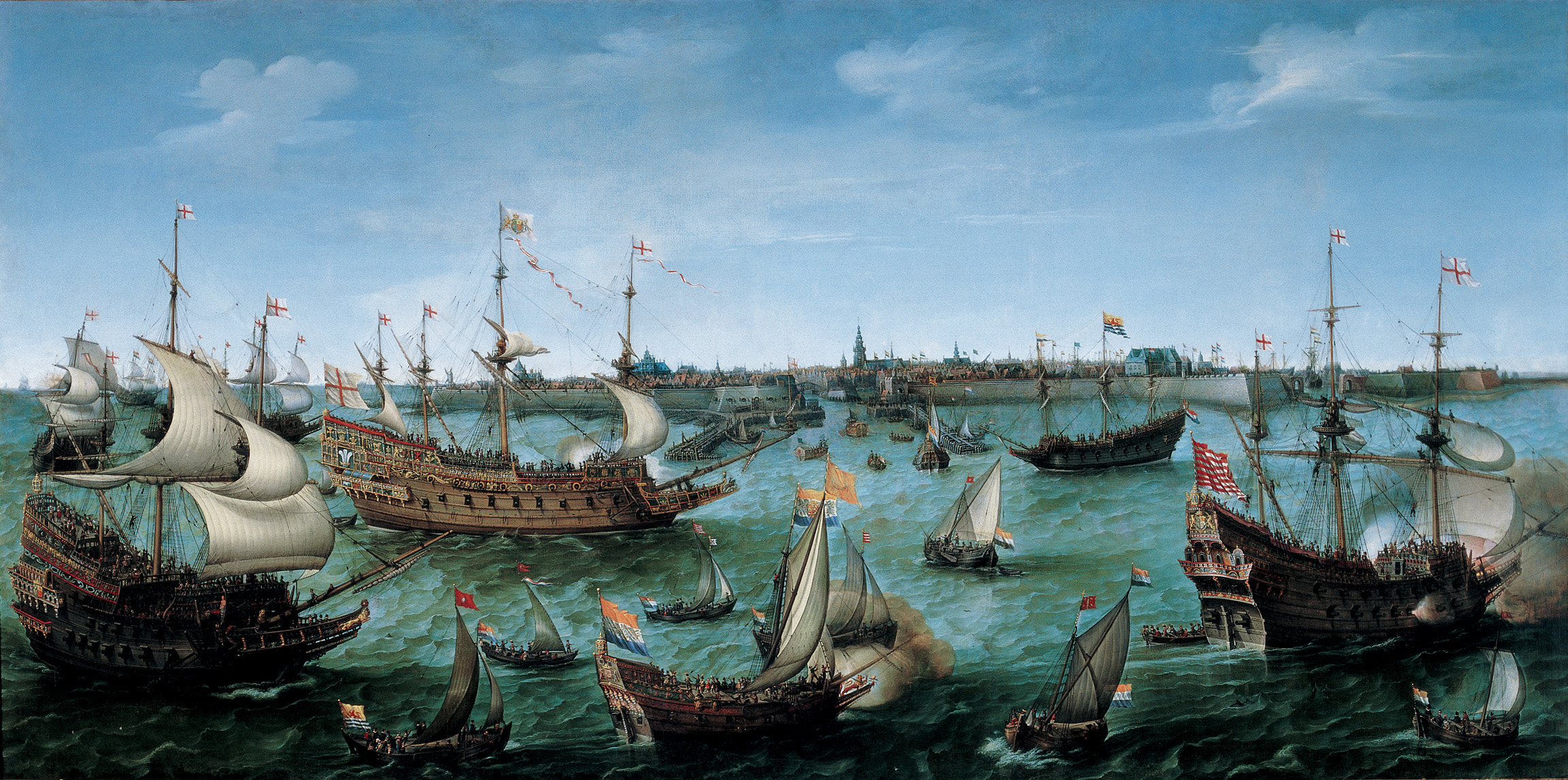
The Arrival at Vlissingen of Frederick V, Elector Palatine, by Hendrick Cornelisz Vroom, oil on canvas.

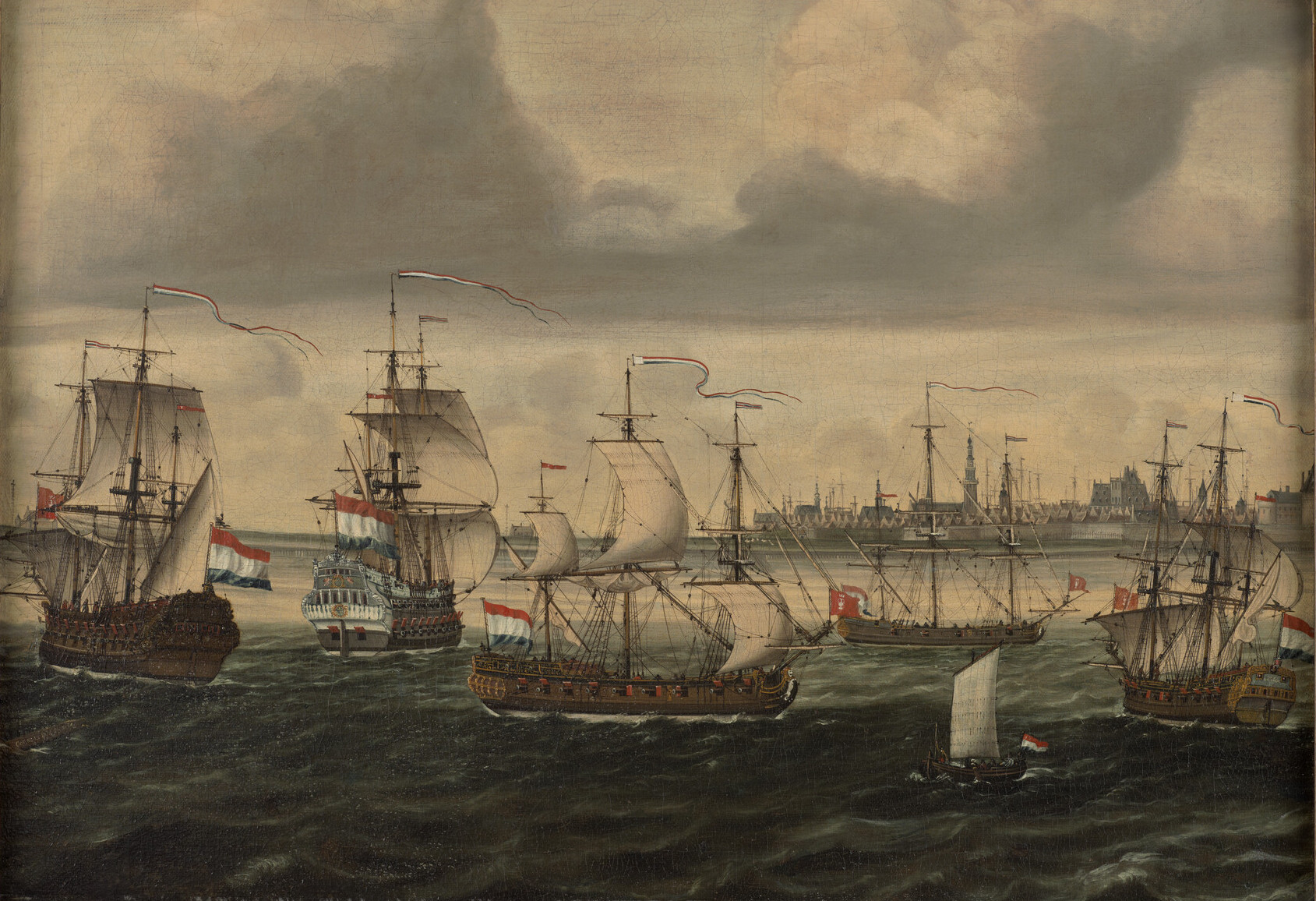
The bringing in of the French warship Le Bourbon, captured at Vigo Bay, to the roadstead of Vlissingen, 1702.

The fishermen's hamlet that came into existence at the estuary of the Schelde around AD 620 has grown over its 1,400-year history into the third-most important port of the Netherlands. The Counts of Holland, Flanders, and Zeeland had the first harbours dug. Over the centuries, Vlissingen developed into a hub for fishing, especially the herring fishery, commerce, privateering and the slave trade.

The first reliable records of Old Vlissengen date from a charter of 1247, when the town already had a church and an infirmary; another in 1264 mentions a steenhuus or castle, the foundations of which were uncovered during the construction of a new town hall in 1965. In 1294, the town was purchased by Floris V, Count of Holland, who recognised the strategic and economic potential of its location and began its development. The port facilities were further extended in the mid-15th century, financed by a local monopoly in the herring trade. In the mid-16th century, the town fell into poverty due to the Eighty Years' War, the Dutch revolt against Spanish occupation, and particularly owing to the punitive taxes imposed by the Duke of Alba. In April 1572, the townspeople staged a successful uprising, expelling the Flemish garrison, firing at ships bringing reinforcements and hanging a Spanish nobleman in front of the town hall. Under the Treaty of Nonsuch in 1585, English garrisons were stationed here and at Brill to keep these ports out of Spanish hands. The towns were sold back to the Dutch in 1616.

During the heyday of the Dutch Golden Age, ships from Vlissingen set sail for the various outposts of the Dutch colonial empire and contributed to the world power of the Seven Provinces.

The history of Vlissingen was also marked by invasion, oppression and bombardments. Because of its strategic position at the mouth of the Schelde, the most important passageway to Antwerp, it has attracted the interest, at one time or another, of the British, the French, the Germans and the Spanish. Floods have also been a constant threat. Vlissingen declined during the 18th century. The Napoleonic Wars were particularly disastrous. After 1870, the economy revived after the construction of new docks and the Walcheren canal, the arrival of the railway and the establishment of the shipyard called De Schelde. The Second World War interrupted this growth. The city was heavily damaged by shelling and inundation but was captured and liberated by British Commandos of 4th Special Service Brigade on 3 November 1944.

The city was rebuilt after the war. In the 1960s, the seaport and industrial area of Vlissingen-Oost developed and flourished. Now this area is the economic driving force behind central Zeeland, generating many thousands of jobs. Nowadays approx. 50,000 ships annually from all corners of the world pass through the Schelde.

Vlissingen's seaside boulevard at the start of the 21st century.

== Name ==
=== Etymology ===
The derivation of the name Vlissingen is unclear, though most scholars relate the name to the word fles ("bottle") in one way or another.

According to one story, when Saint Willibrord landed in Vlissingen with a bottle in the 7th century, he shared its contents with the beggars he found there while trying to convert them. A miracle occurred, typical of hagiography, when the contents of the bottle did not diminish. When the bishop realised the beggars did not want to listen to his words, he gave them his bottle. After that, he supposedly called the city Flessinghe.

Another source states that the name had its origins in an old ferry-service house, on which a bottle was attached by way of a sign. The monk Jacob van Dreischor, who visited the city in 967, then apparently called the ferry-house het veer aan de Flesse ("the ferry at the Bottle"). Because many cities in the region later received the appendix -inge, the name, according to this etymology, evolved to Vles-inge.

According to another source, the name was derived from the Danish word Vles, which means "tides".

The eastern cape of Novaya Zemlya, Cape Flissingsky was named after the city in 1596 by Willem Barentsz.

=== Historical English name "Flushing" ===
Vlissingen was historically called "Flushing" in English. In the 17th century, Vlissingen was important enough for English speakers that it had acquired an anglicised name. For example, Samuel Pepys referred to the town as "Flushing" in his diaries. In 1673, Sir William Temple referred to Vlissingen as "Flushing" once and "Flussingue" twice in his book about the Netherlands. Some English writers in the Netherlands also used the Dutch name.

The American settlement of Flushing, originally a Dutch colonial village founded in 1645 and now part of Queens, New York City, was first called Vlissingen after the town in the Netherlands. The English settlers who also came to live in the village shortened the name to "Vlissing" by 1657 and then began to call it by its English name "Flushing". The Anglicisation of "Vlissingen" into "Flushing" did not occur after the conquest of New Netherland, but in England well before then. This village was the site of the Flushing Remonstrance.

The village of Flushing in Cornwall was also named after Vlissingen. Originally named Nankersey, the village was given its name by Dutch engineers from Vlissingen in the Netherlands who built the three main quays in the village. Michigan and Ohio in the US have villages called Flushing as well.

== Gallery ==
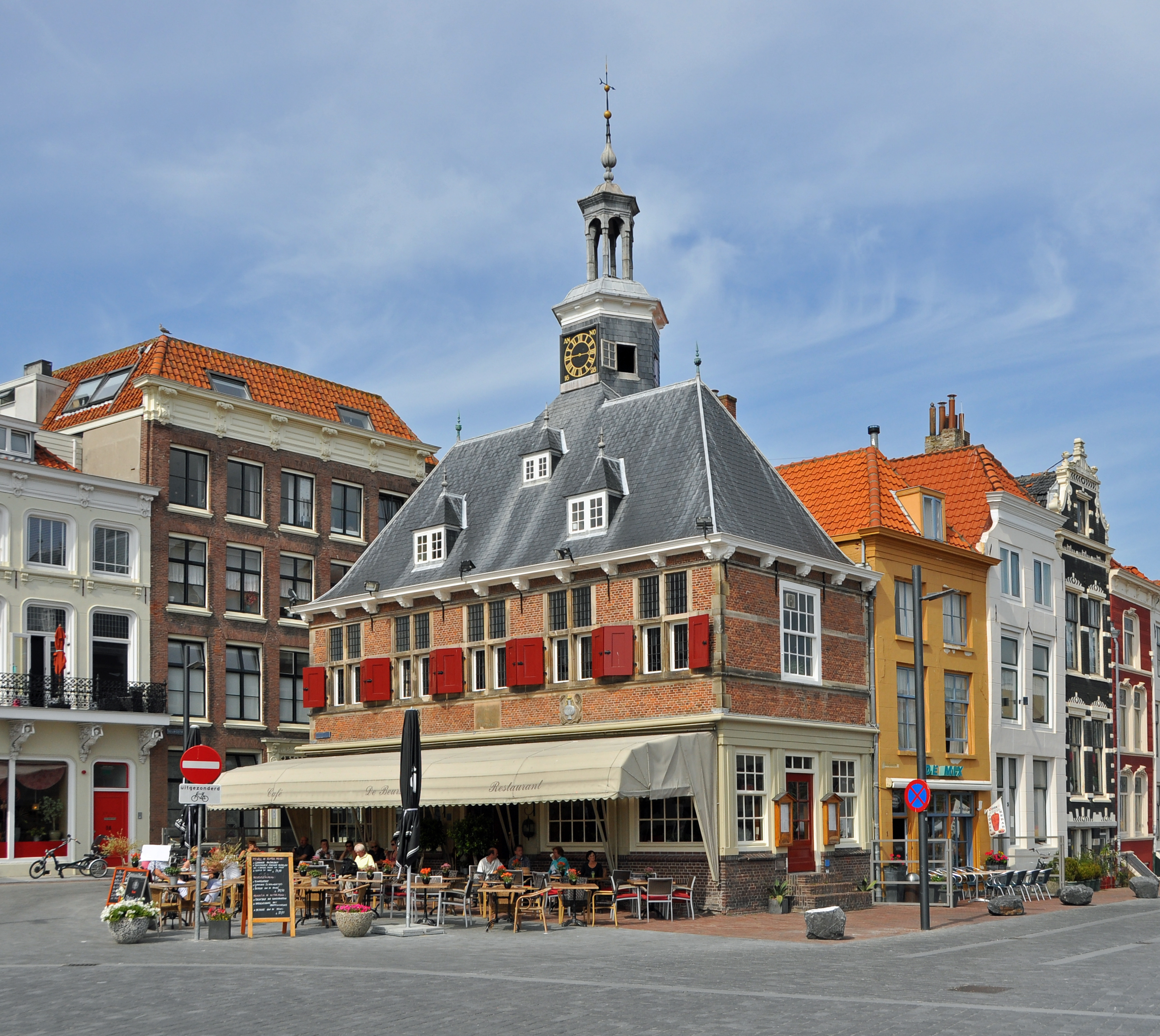
The Market building at Beursplein (Marketsquare)

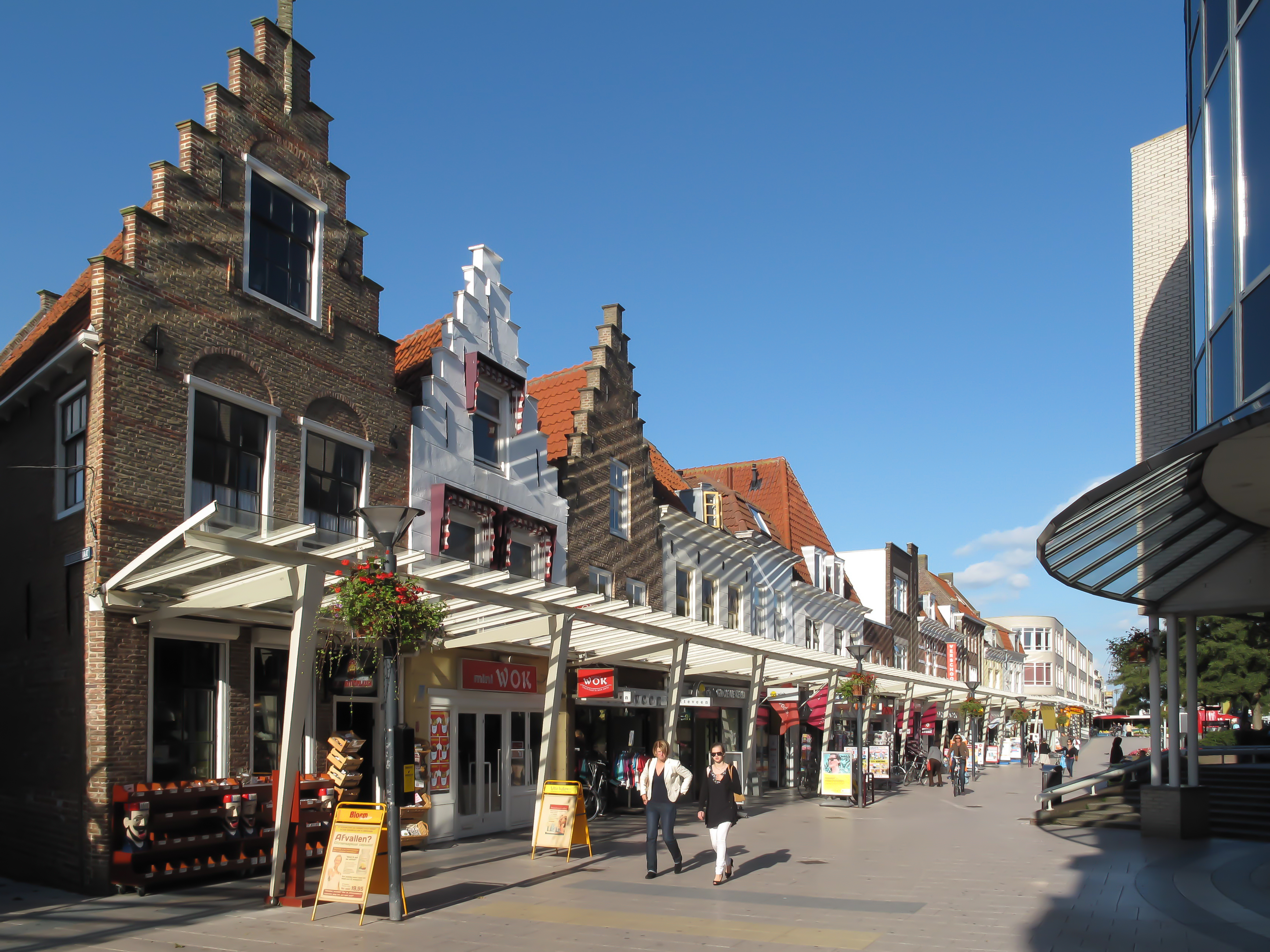
Part of the shopping street Walstraat in 2010

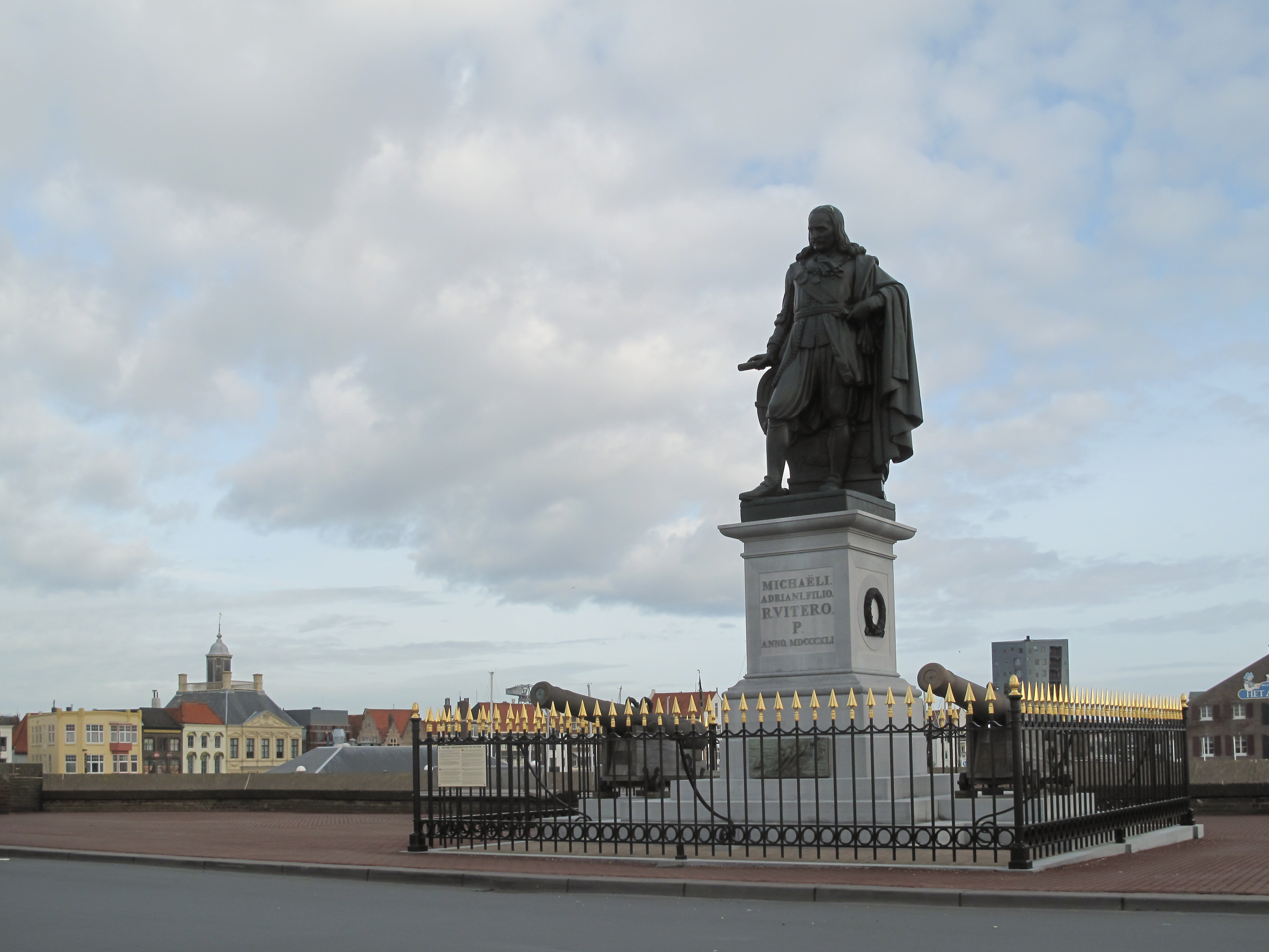
Statue Michiel de Ruyter

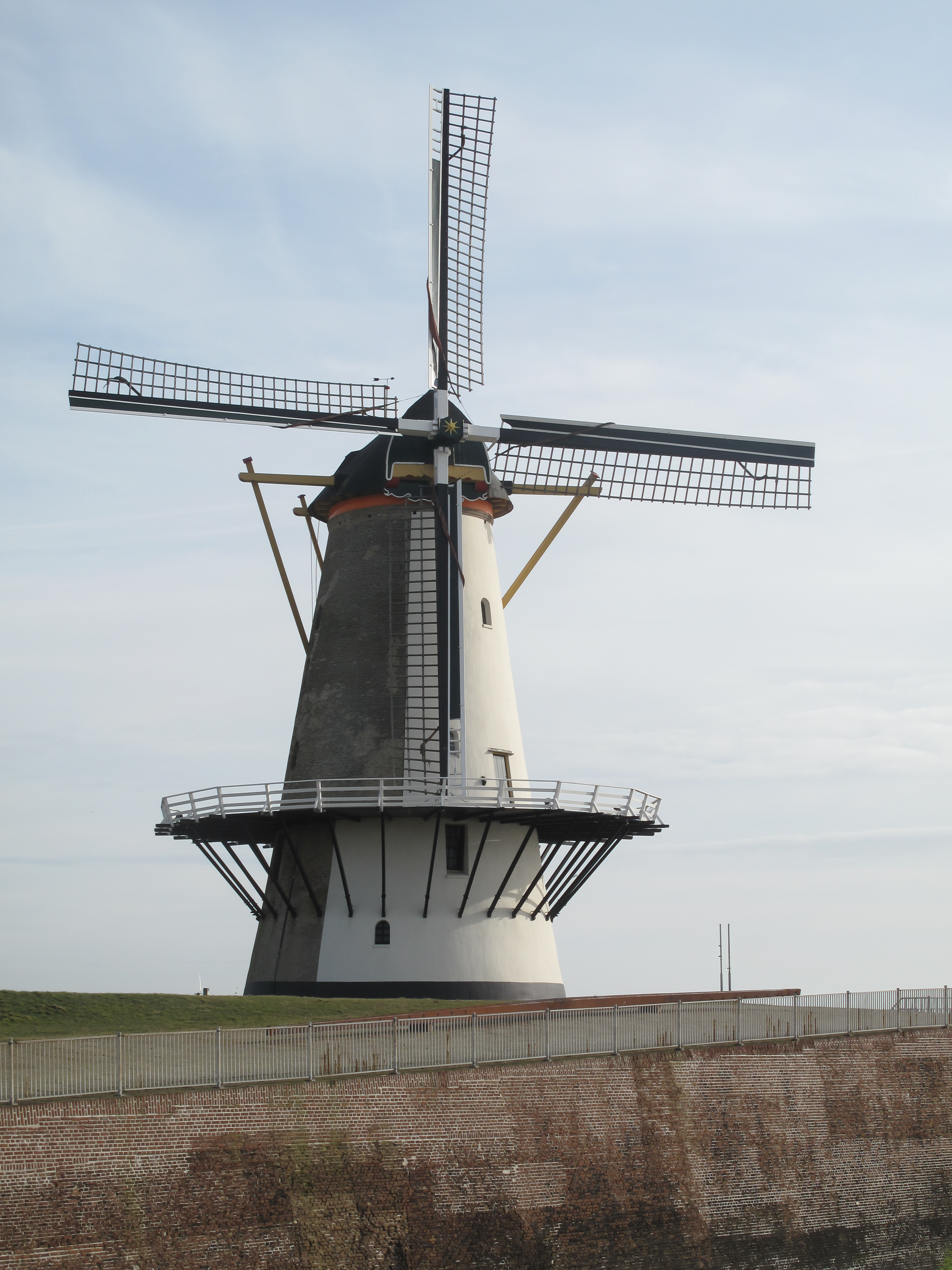
Windmill: de Oranjemolen

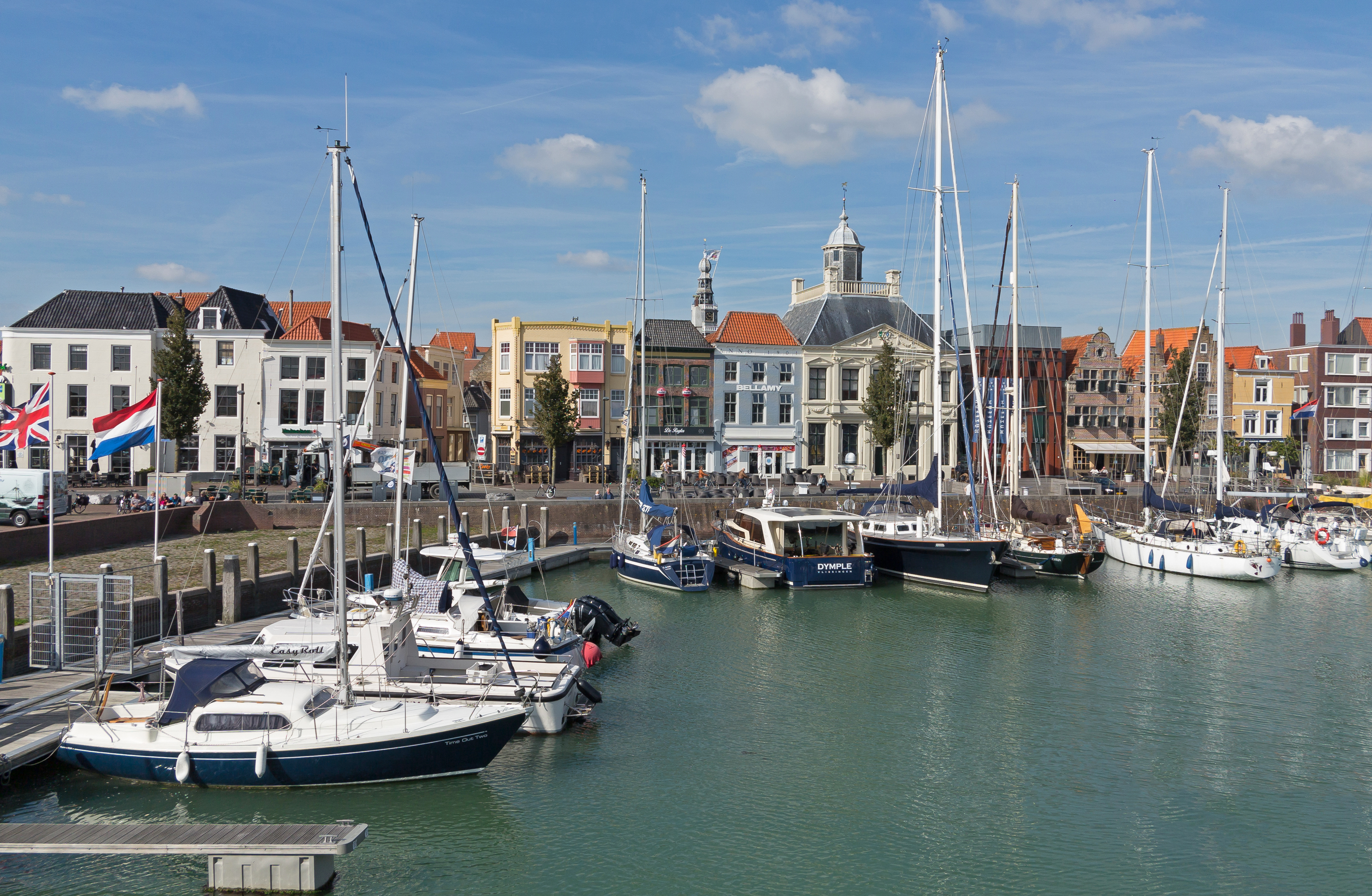
View to a port and a street (de Nieuwendijk)

== Topography ==
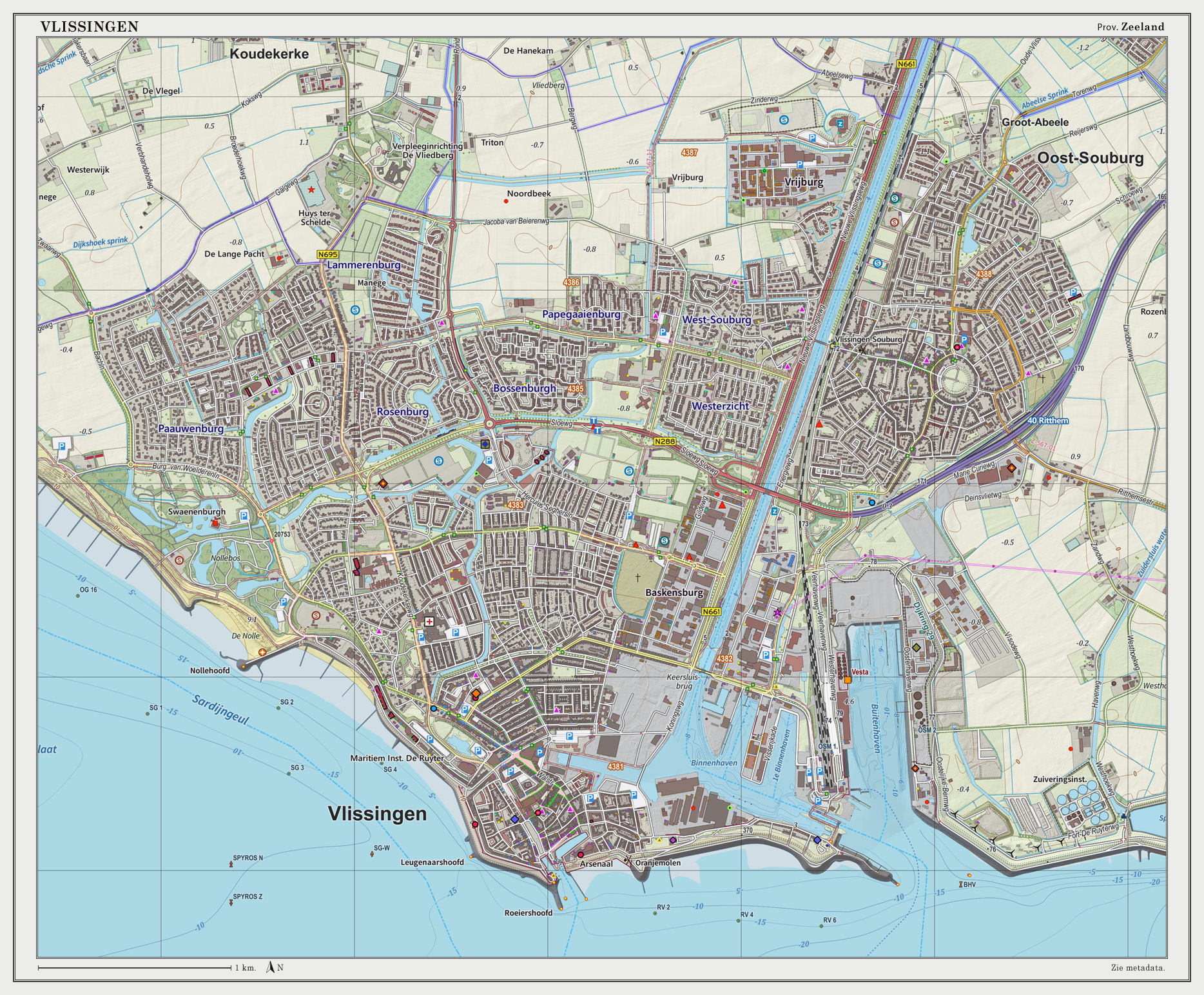

Topographic map of Vlissingen (city), Sept. 2014

== Climate ==
Vlissingen has a temperate oceanic climate (Köppen climate classification Cfb) that is milder than the rest of the Netherlands due to its more southern location on the coast. It is approximately 1.5 degrees Celsius warmer annually than Groningen in the northeast. It is also one of the sunniest cities in the Netherlands, receiving approximately 180 more sunshine hours than Maastricht in the southeast. Its all-time record is 36.8 °C (98.2 °F) set on 27 July 2018 and −18.9 °C (−2.0 °F) on 21 February 1956.

Climate data for Vlissingen (1991−2020 normals, extremes 1906−present)
Month	Jan	Feb	Mar	Apr	May	Jun	Jul	Aug	Sep	Oct	Nov	Dec	Year
Record high °C (°F)	14.2 (57.6)	16.9 (62.4)	21.1 (70.0)	29.9 (85.8)	34.9 (94.8)	35.3 (95.5)	37.3 (99.1)	34.2 (93.6)	33.2 (91.8)	25.0 (77.0)	18.3 (64.9)	14.8 (58.6)	37.3 (99.1)
Mean daily maximum °C (°F)	6.4 (43.5)	6.8 (44.2)	9.6 (49.3)	13.3 (55.9)	16.8 (62.2)	19.6 (67.3)	21.8 (71.2)	22.0 (71.6)	19.0 (66.2)	14.8 (58.6)	10.4 (50.7)	7.2 (45.0)	14.0 (57.2)
Daily mean °C (°F)	4.5 (40.1)	4.6 (40.3)	6.8 (44.2)	9.8 (49.6)	13.3 (55.9)	16.1 (61.0)	18.4 (65.1)	18.6 (65.5)	16.1 (61.0)	12.4 (54.3)	8.5 (47.3)	5.4 (41.7)	11.2 (52.2)
Mean daily minimum °C (°F)	2.6 (36.7)	2.6 (36.7)	4.4 (39.9)	6.9 (44.4)	10.2 (50.4)	13.0 (55.4)	15.4 (59.7)	15.6 (60.1)	13.4 (56.1)	10.1 (50.2)	6.5 (43.7)	3.5 (38.3)	8.7 (47.7)
Record low °C (°F)	−15.3 (4.5)	−18.9 (−2.0)	−6.5 (20.3)	−3.3 (26.1)	0.8 (33.4)	5.0 (41.0)	8.3 (46.9)	8.9 (48.0)	3.9 (39.0)	−1.9 (28.6)	−7.5 (18.5)	−13.5 (7.7)	−18.9 (−2.0)
Average precipitation mm (inches)	58.9 (2.32)	52.8 (2.08)	44.6 (1.76)	35.0 (1.38)	49.4 (1.94)	62.0 (2.44)	72.4 (2.85)	81.8 (3.22)	73.6 (2.90)	73.8 (2.91)	78.9 (3.11)	75.7 (2.98)	758.9 (29.88)
Average precipitation days (≥ 1 mm)	12	9	11	9	10	10	9	10	11	12	13	13	128
Average snowy days	5	5	2	1	0	0	0	0	0	0	2	3	18
Average relative humidity (%)	86.9	85.1	82.1	77.1	76.8	77.4	77.4	77.5	79.6	83.3	86.9	87.4	81.5
Mean monthly sunshine hours	76.3	99.0	155.5	207.5	233.8	230.1	232.1	217.0	170.8	127.0	77.4	62.5	1,889
Percentage possible sunshine	29.1	35.0	42.2	49.7	48.4	46.4	46.5	47.9	44.9	38.2	28.8	25.4	40.2
Source 1: Royal Netherlands Meteorological Institute (1991–2020 normals, precipitation days normals for 1981–2010, snowy days normals for 1971–2000)
Source 2: Royal Netherlands Meteorological Institute

Climate data for Vlissingen
Month	Jan	Feb	Mar	Apr	May	Jun	Jul	Aug	Sep	Oct	Nov	Dec	Year
Average sea temperature °C	6.6	5.8	6.9	9.5	13.2	16.6	19.0	20.0	18.4	15.3	11.4	8.0	12.6
Mean daily daylight hours	8.0	10.0	12.0	14.0	16.0	17.0	16.0	15.0	13.0	11.0	9.0	8.0	12.4
Average Ultraviolet index	0	1	2	4	5	7	7	6	4	3	1	1	3.5
Source: Weather Atlas

== Notable people ==
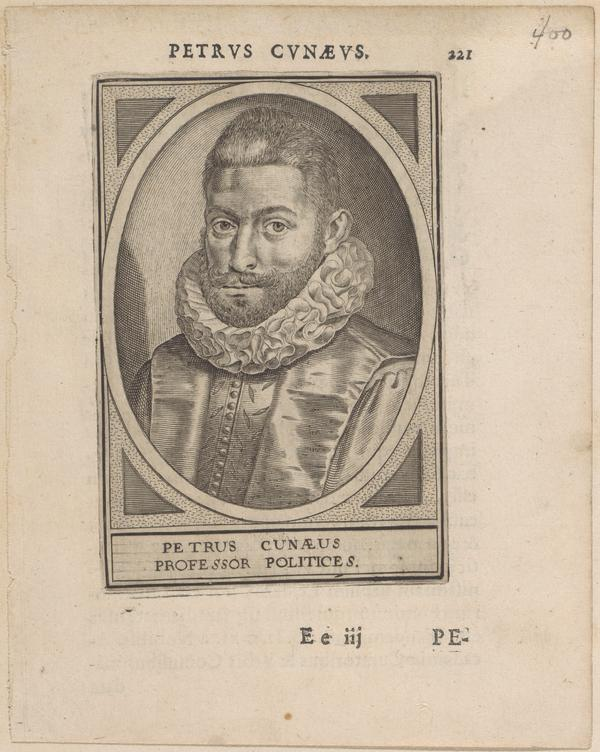
Petrus Cunaeus, ca.1630

=== The arts ===
- Petrus Cunaeus (1586–1638), Dutch Christian scholar, wrote The Hebrew Republic
- Adriaan Dortsman (1635–1682), a Dutch Golden Age architect of Amsterdam
- Betje Wolff (1738–1804), a Dutch novelist
- Jacobus Bellamy (1757–1786), a Dutch poet
- Paula de Waart (1876–1938), a Dutch film actress
- Helene Koppejan (1927–1998), a Dutch astrologer and entrepreneur
- Fred Florusse (1938–2023), a Dutch actor, comedian, stage director and TV and radio presenter
- Hans Verhagen (1939-2020), a Dutch journalist, poet, painter and filmmaker
- Jean-Pierre Guiran (born 1957), accordion player with Accordéon Mélancolique
- Arendo Joustra (born 1957), a Dutch writer and journalist

=== Science ===
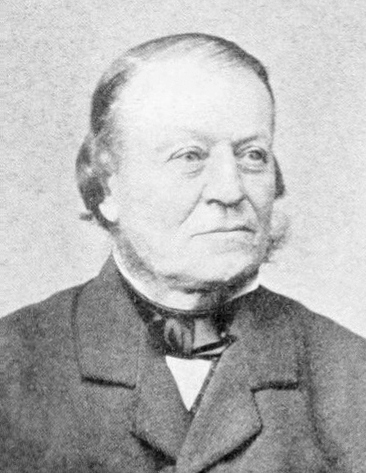
Martin Kalbfleisch, 1893

- Jan Bekker Teerlink (1759–1832), a Dutch plant and seed collector and winemaker
- Martin Kalbfleisch (1804–1873), a Dutch pioneer in the chemical industry and a US politician.
- Egbert Cornelis Nicolaas van Hoepen (1884–1966), a Dutch-born South African paleontologist
- Prof. Bonno Thoden van Velzen (1933–2020), a Dutch anthropologist
- Maarten de Rijke (born 1961), a Dutch computer scientist, worked on modal logic and knowledge representation

=== Admirals ===
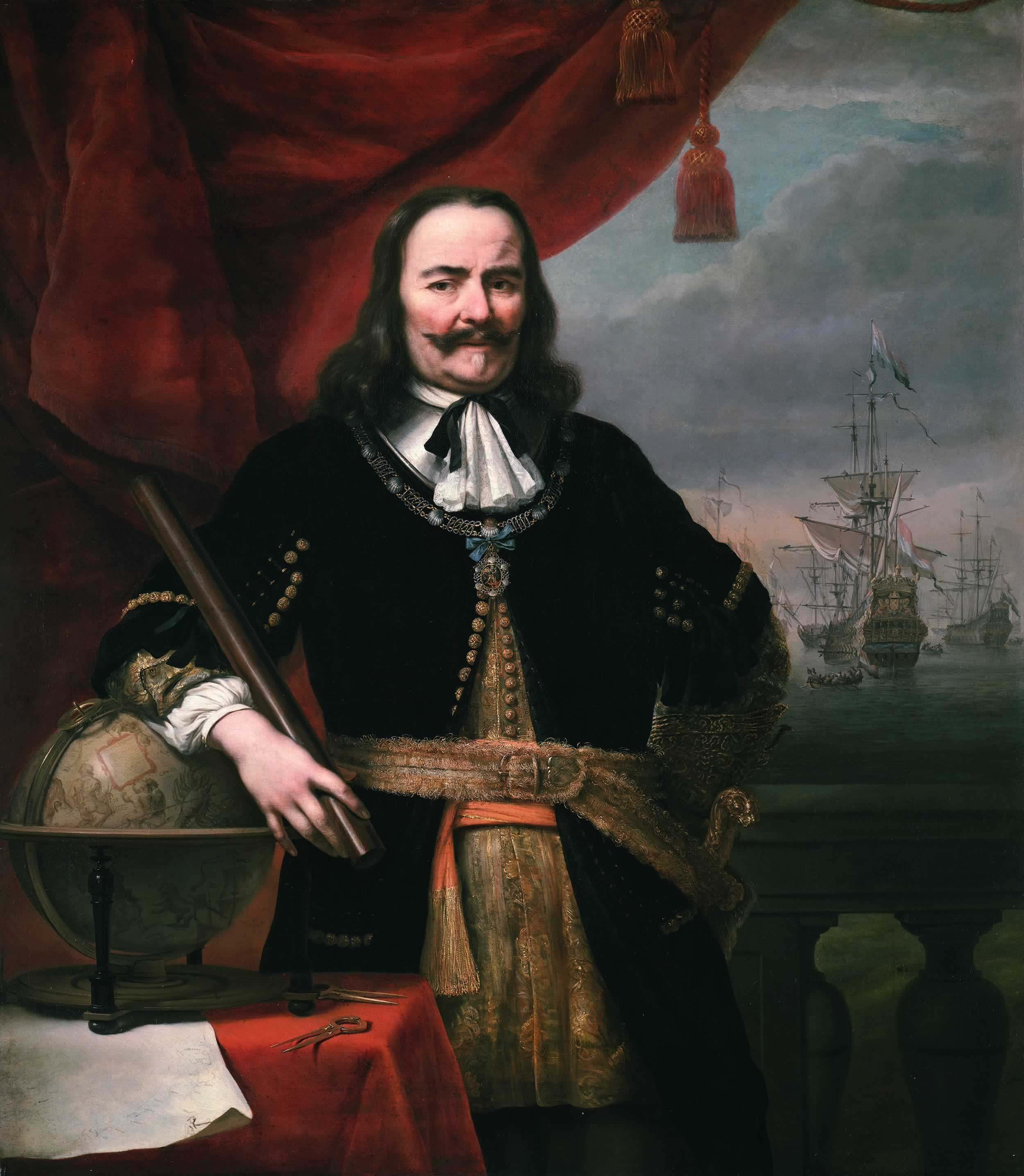
Michiel de Ruyter, 1667

- Joos de Moor (1548 or 1558 – 1618), a Dutch Vice Admiral of Zeeland
- Laurens Alteras (died 1622), a Dutch (Zealandic) vice admiral
- Joost Banckert (c.1597–1647), a Dutch Vice Admiral
- Johan Evertsen (1600–1666), a Dutch admiral
- Mårten Anckarhielm (died 1657), a Dutch admiral who entered into Swedish service
- Abraham Crijnssen (died 1669), a Dutch naval commander
- Michiel de Ruyter (1607–1676), a widely celebrated Dutch admiral
- Cornelis Evertsen the Elder (1610–1666), a Dutch admiral.
- Adriaen Banckert (c.1615–1684), a Dutch admiral
- Cornelis Evertsen the Younger (1628–1679), a Dutch Admiral
- Cornelis Evertsen the Youngest (1642–1706), a Dutch admiral
- Engel de Ruyter (1649–1683), a Dutch vice-admiral

=== Other maritime travellers ===
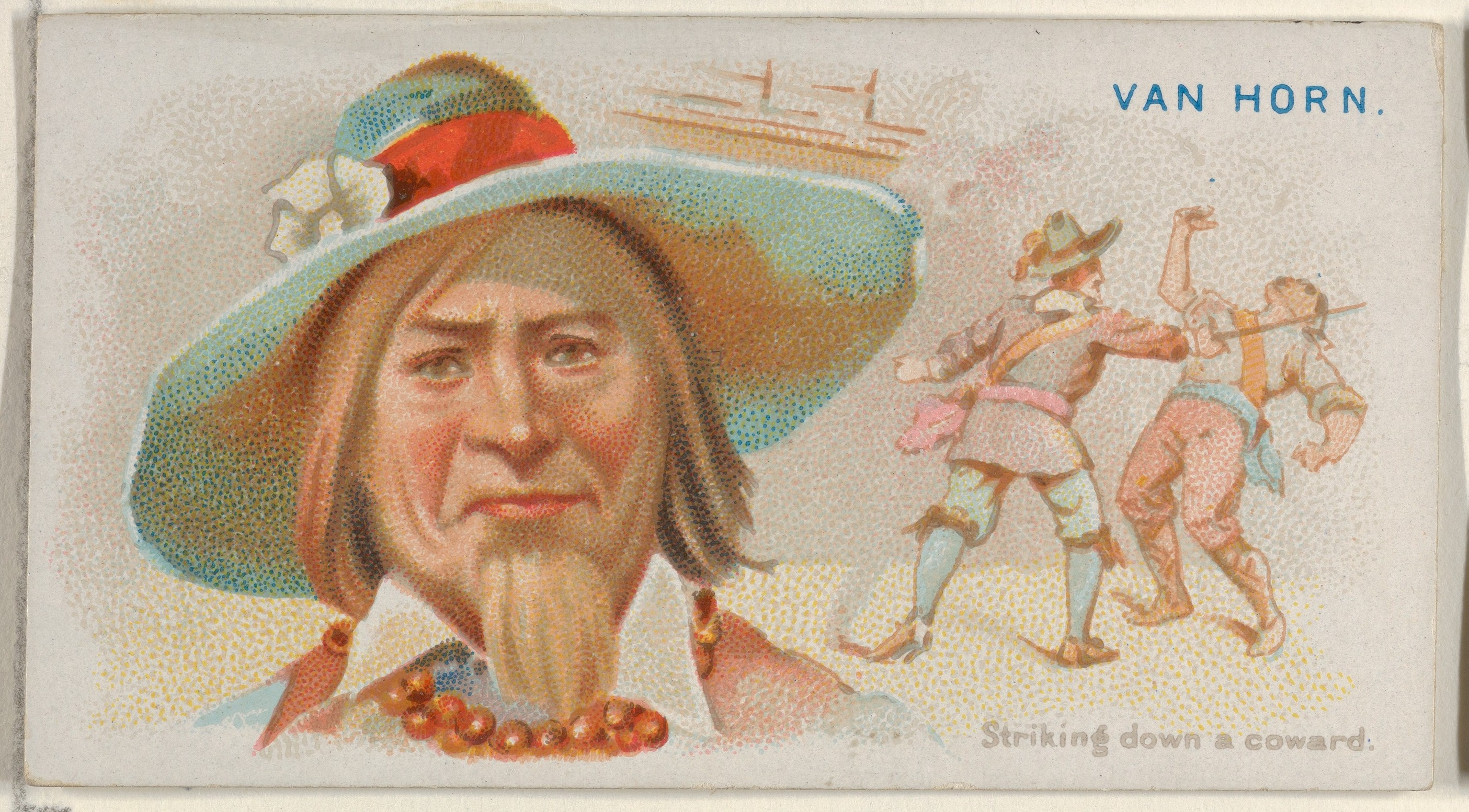
Nicholas van Horn, printed 1888

- Willem Verstegen (c.1612–1659), a merchant in service of the Dutch East India Company and chief trader of factory
- Pieter Ita (active 1620s), a Dutch privateer and an admiral in the Dutch West India Company
- Nicholas van Hoorn (c.1635–1683), a merchant sailor, privateer and pirate.
- Jasper Danckaerts (1639–1702/1704), the founder of a colony of Labadists in Maryland
- Jan Erasmus Reyning (1640–1697), a Dutch pirate, privateer and naval officer
- Samuel van der Putte (1690–1745), a Dutch explorer, linguist and naturalist; journeyed in Asia, especially to Tibet

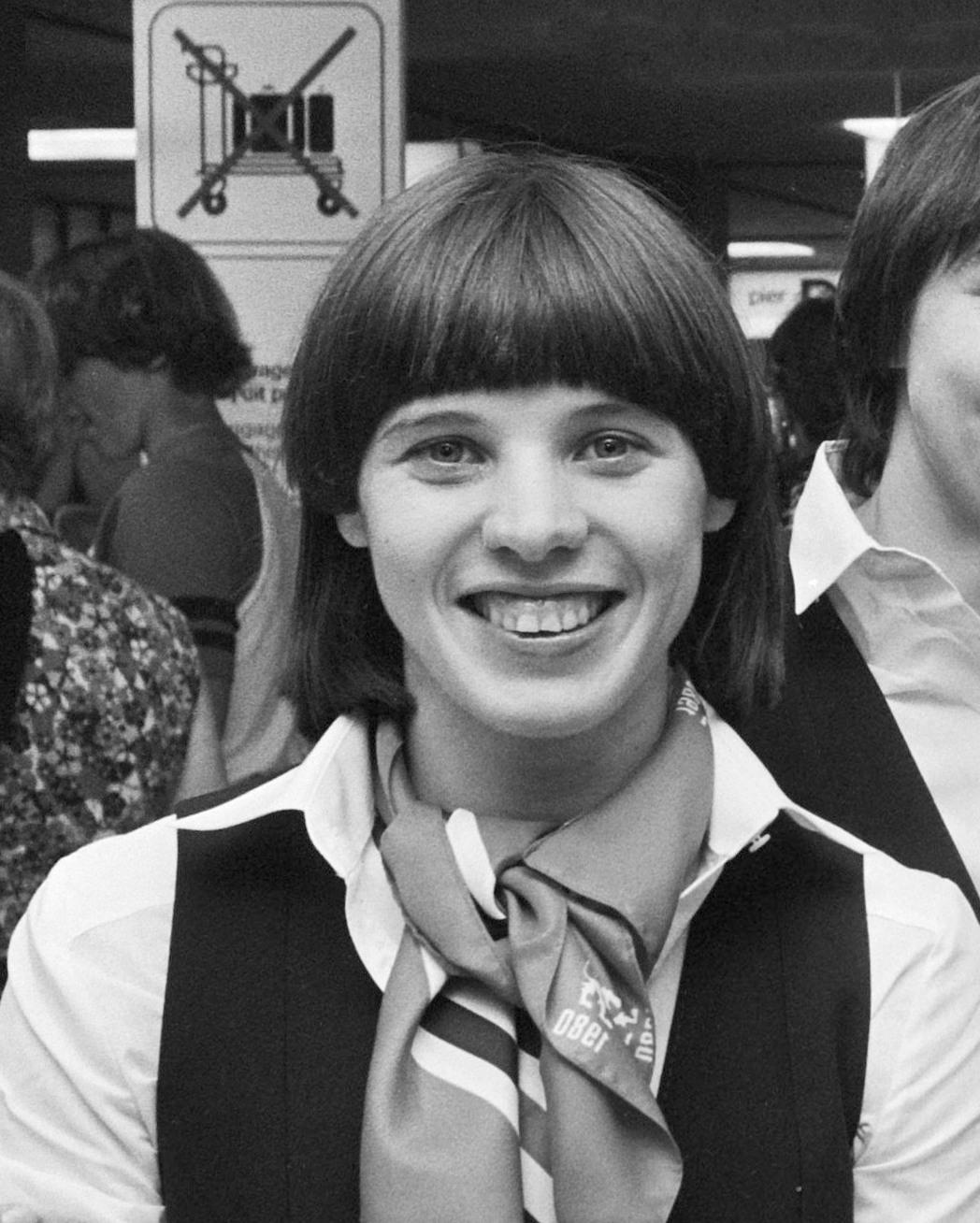
Els Vader, 1980

=== Sport ===
- Joris Tjebbes (1929–2001), a Dutch freestyle swimmer, competed at the 1952 Summer Olympics
- Nel Fritz (born 1937), a retired Dutch gymnast, competed in all artistic gymnastics events at the 1960 Summer Olympics
- Els Vader (1959–2021), a Dutch track and field sprinter, competed at the 1980, 1984 and 1988 Summer Olympics
- Danny Blind (born 1961), a former Dutch international football player
- Lex Veldhuis (born 1983), Dutch professional poker player

== Transport ==
- Railway stations: Vlissingen, Vlissingen Souburg.
- Ferry connection to Breskens, since March 2003 (opening of the Western Scheldt Tunnel) for pedestrians and cyclists only.

- There used to be a ferry service to Sheerness operated by Olau Line. It was discontinued in 1994.

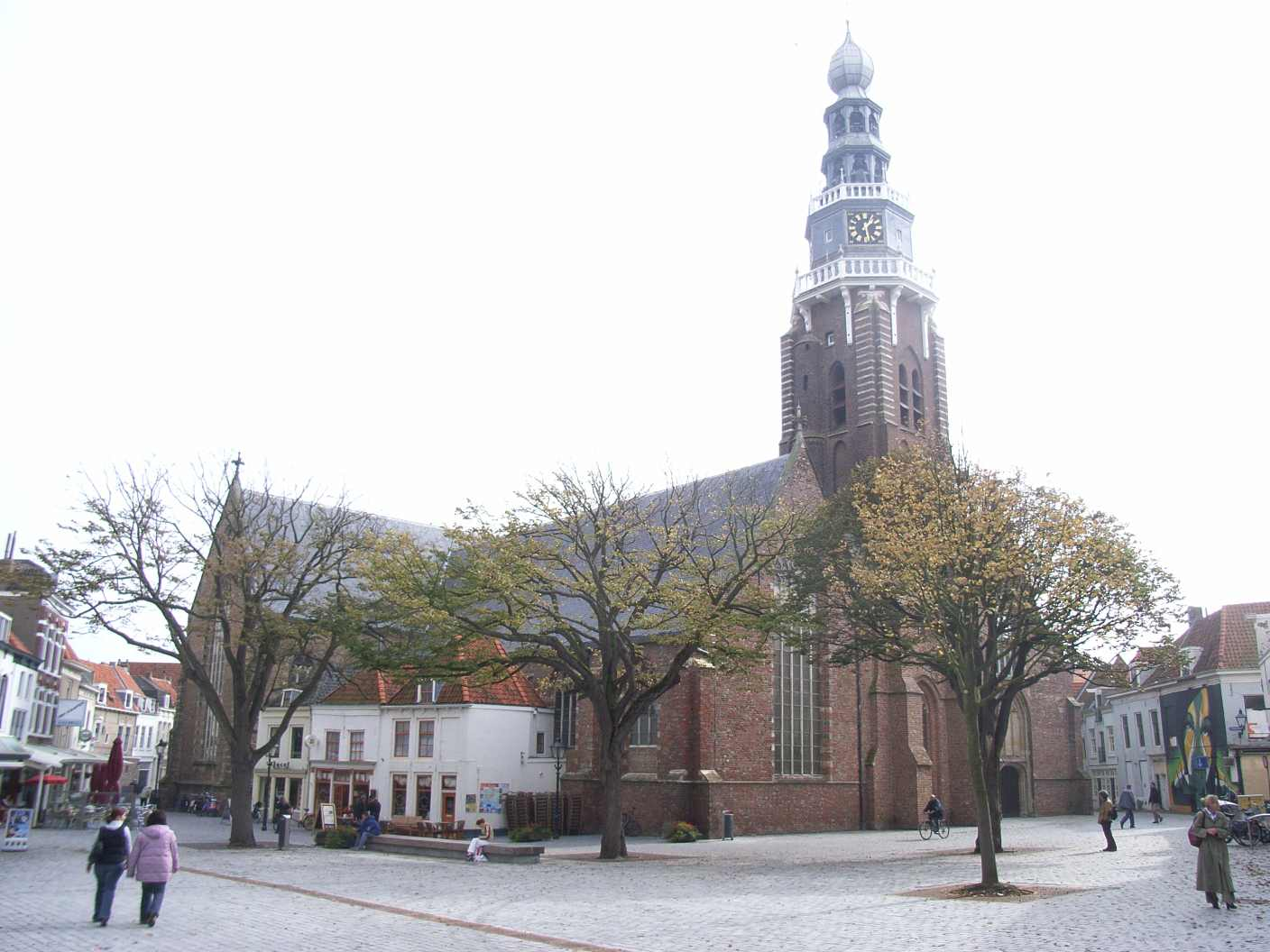
St. Jacobskerk

== In popular culture ==
- Vlissingen is the setting for part of Arthur Ransome's children's adventure novel We Didn't Mean to Go to Sea.
- Vlissingen is also the setting for most of the film The Fourth Man.
- Vlissingen is also the hometown of Mynheer Claessens and his daughter Johanna, the heroine of Rafael Sabatini's 1929 novel "The Romantic Prince". The Hero, Count Anthony and Master Danvelt, having landed by ferry from Breskens, enter the massive fortifications by the Scheldt Gate and ride the short distance to the Claessen's handsome house by the Groote.
- The Forgotten Battle, a Netflix movie.
