= Battle of Sluis (1603) =

1603 naval battle between a Spanish royal and a Dutch rebel fleet

Coordinates: 51°20′N 3°23′E

- Part of the Eighty Years' War
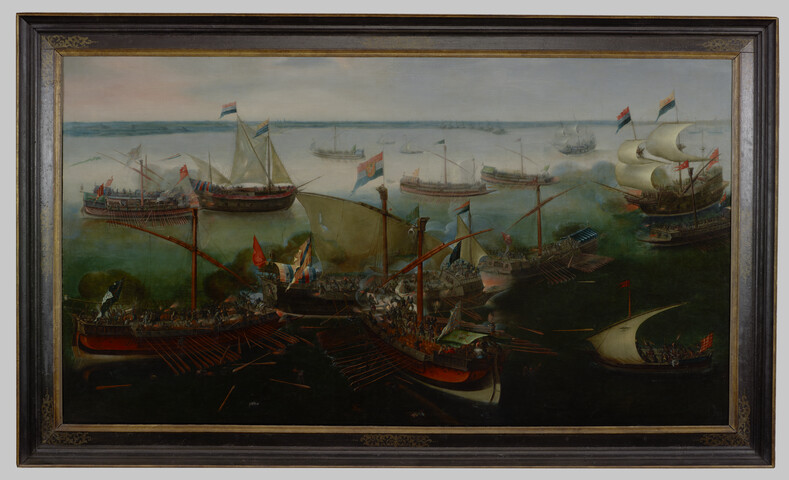
- Battle of Sluis, by Hendrick Cornelisz Vroom
Date	26 May 1603
Location	Sluis (present-day Netherlands)
Result	Dutch victory

Belligerents
Dutch Republic	Spain

Commanders and leaders
Joos de Moor	Federico Spinola †

Strength
3 men-of-war, 2 galleys, several minor vessels(Spanish source); 2 galleys, 2 smaller vessels.(Dutch source)	8 galleys, 1,130 soldiers(Spanish source); 8 galleys, 4 smaller vessels(Dutch source)

Casualties and losses
Dutch source: 50 killed or wounded Spanish source: 720 killed 1 man-of-war sunk	Dutch source: 800 killed or wounded Spanish source: 414 killed

The Battle of Sluis was a naval battle during the Eighty Years' War in which a Spanish squadron commanded by the Italian captain Federico Spinola tried to break through a blockade of Sluis by Dutch ships under the command of Joos de Moor. After about two hours of fighting the heavily damaged Spanish ships returned to Sluis. Federico Spinola was killed during the action.

== Background ==
Federico Spinola was the younger brother of the famous general Ambrogio Spinola. At the end of the 16th century, Federico advised Philip III of Spain to use the galley, a type of ship that was still dominant in the Mediterranean Sea, also to be deployed in Flanders and in Zeeland. The many shallows, winding and narrow streams could give an oar-powered vessel a decisive advantage over ships that depended on the wind. Six large galleys were built and Spinola engaged successfully as a privateer against Dutch and English merchant ships, despite suffering a defeat at Ostend against a squadron from the County of Holland. He used Sluis as a base.

In response to this, the states of Holland and West Friesland had a Red Galley built at Vlaardingen in 1598. In 1600, a larger, thirty meter long Black Galley was built in Dordrecht. These ships were also successful and five new galleys were built by the Dutch. This led to an arms race. Spinola did not have the capacity to build enough ships in Flanders, so in 1602 he attempted to sail from Portugal to Flanders with eight galleys, manned by nine hundred sailors and soldiers and powered by fifteen hundred galley slaves. He built seven of them on his own, after Philip III rejected a much more ambitious proposal to conquer England with an entire armada of galleys. However, his Protestant enemies became aware of these plans. An English squadron of twelve ships intercepted his fleet at the mouth of the Tagus on June 3, 1602 and sank two galleys in the subsequent battle.

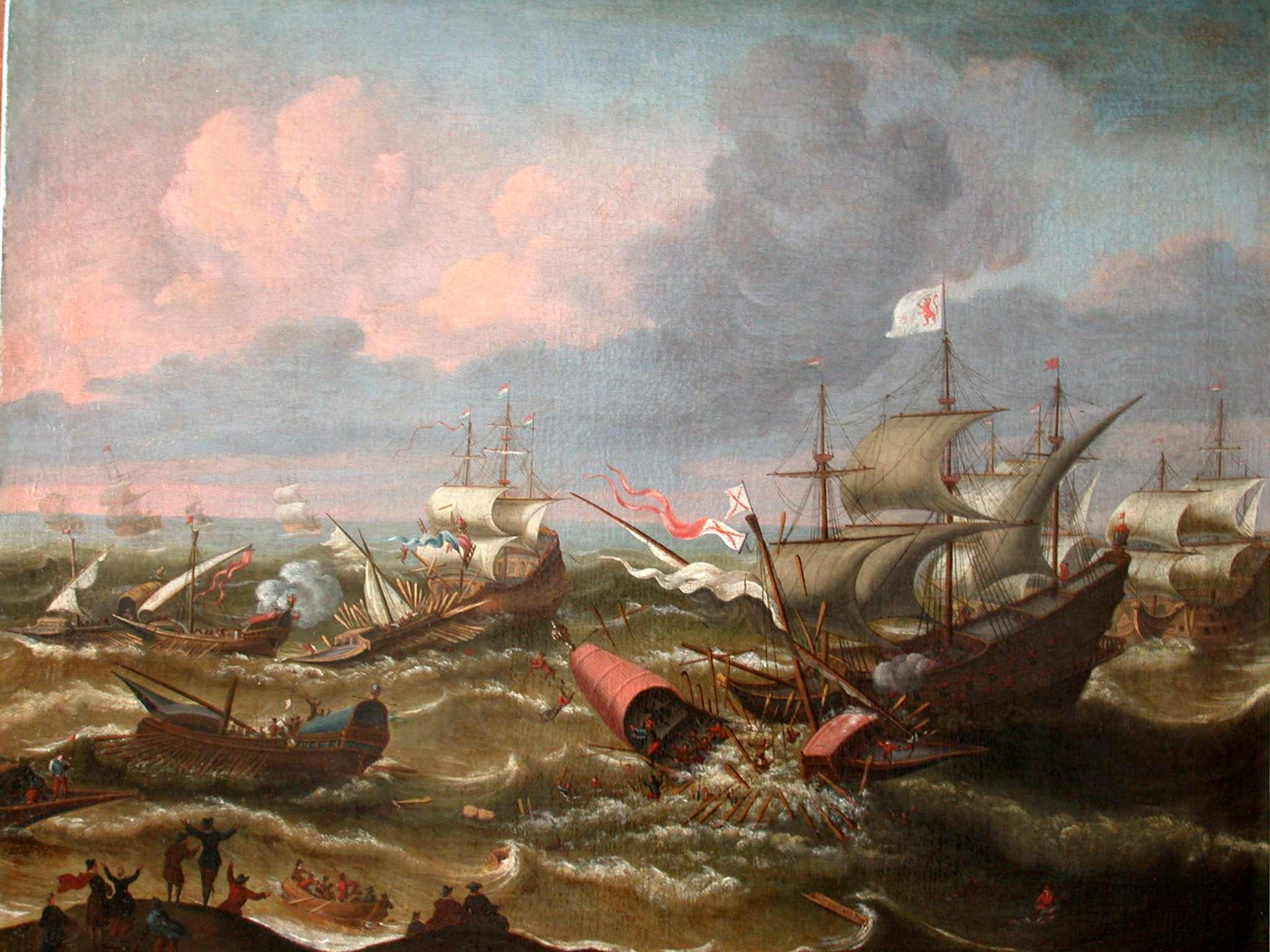
Cant's ship Halve Maene crossed paths with Padilla, on October 3, 1602.

Spinola returned to Lisbon, but attempted to reach Flanders again with the remaining six galleys after embarking additional oarsmen, soldiers and money. Vice Admiral Jacob van Duyvenvoorde was sent to blockade it with nine ships, but upon arrival he discovered that Spinola had already escaped to the north. In the Strait of Dover, Spinola was met by an English flotilla and a Dutch flotilla of four ships commanded by Jan Adriaanszoon Cant, whom Van Duyvenoorde had sent back. Cant's ships sank two galleys on 3 October 1602 during the Battle of the Narrow Seas. Two other galleys fled damaged to Nieuwpoort, another fled to the port of Calais and was seized by the French. Spinola only managed to reach Dunkirk with his own galley San Luis.

However, Spinola repaired the two galleys at Nieuwpoort and managed to concentrate eight galleys in 1603, at Sluis de Knokke. He devised a plan to attack Walcheren, on the other side of the Western Scheldt. However, waiting for him at sea was a blockading squadron, commanded by Joos de Moor, made up of two galleys, the Black Galley and the Zeeland Flesse, two smaller ships and an armed merchant ship. The Dutch Navy rarely built specialized warships during this period, but converted merchant ships as needed.

== Battle ==
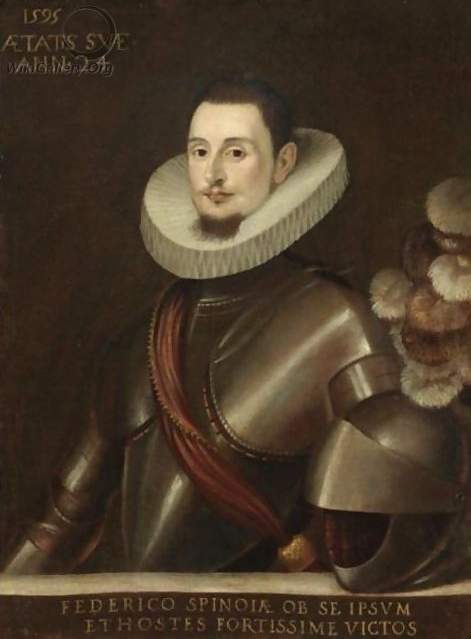
Federico Spinola died in the battle.

On May 26, Spinola left, taking advantage of a lull that prevented the Zeeland fleet at Vlissingen from coming to De Moor's aid. In this way, his ships were able to fully exploit their superior mobility. Spinola had eight galleys and four light frigates, all well manned, the largest ships having 250 oarsmen and another 200 soldiers. The eight galleys first positioned themselves in the shape of a crescent moon, encompassing half of the Dutch fleet, and then divided into two groups of four.

The Black Galley under the command of Captain Jacob Michielsz Wip was rammed by two of the large Spanish galleys, which did not have much effect, as the galleys of that time did not have ram bows. The usual tactic was to slide the long bow over the enemy ship's rail and then board it, supported by the two cannons positioned in the galley's front superstructure, which represented its main firepower. The Spanish thus tried to enter the Black Galley, but were repelled by several well-aimed cannon shots, after which the fight continued with sword, pistol and knife.

After about an hour, Admiral Willem de Zoete, lord of Haultain, managed to leave the port of Vlissingen with the Zealand fleet. This reinforcement clearly turned the odds in favor of the Dutch fleet. The heavily damaged Spanish fleet withdrew to Sluis. Spinola was mortally wounded. De Moor and Pieterssen were also injured but recovered. Captain Jacob Michielsz Wip was killed and Lieutenant Commander Hart led the defense of the Black Galley. Spanish losses were generally heavy, although probably less than the four to eight hundred men mentioned in Dutch reports of the time. The Dutch fleet had 47 casualties. The battle was seen as a clear victory in the United Provinces. The crews received eleven tons of beer and Joos de Moor, Pieterssen and Van Gorcum a gold chain of honor. The battle is the subject of two well-known paintings, one perhaps by Cornelis Vroom, which is currently in the collection of the Het Scheepvaartmuseum in Amsterdam. The second by Andries Eertveld is displayed in the Bell Tower of Sluis.

== Aftermath ==
This was the only naval battle during the Eighty Years' War in which galleys were used on both sides. In 1604, Sluis was conquered by Dutch troops and the galleys quickly lost their significance. A similar development occurred in the Mediterranean Sea, where agile frigates replaced galleys throughout the 17th century.
