= Federico Spinola =

Spanish Navy officer (1571–1603)

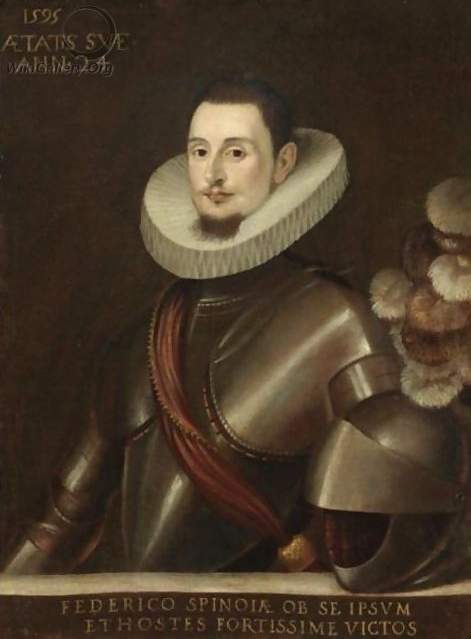
- Portrait by Federico Barocci, 1595
- Born: 1571; Genoa, Republic of Genoa
- Died: 26 May 1603 (aged 31–32); Sluis, County of Flanders, Spanish Netherlands
- Relatives: Ambrogio Spinola (brother)
- Military career
- Allegiance: Spain
- Branch: Spanish Navy
- Service years: 1598–1603
- Rank: Admiral
- Conflicts: Battle of Sesimbra Bay (1602); Battle of the Narrow Seas (1602); Battle of Sluis (1603) †

Admiral Federico Spinola (1571 – 26 May 1603) was a Spanish Navy officer who served in the Eighty Years' War.

== Life ==
Spinola was born in Genoa in 1571 and studied at the University of Salamanca in preparation for an intended ecclesiastical career. Instead he took service in the Army of Flanders under Alexander Farnese, Duke of Parma.

In 1598, he travelled to Madrid with a proposal to build up a fleet of galleys in Flanders that could be used to launch an invasion of England. Approval was granted, and a squadron of six galleys was placed under his command, which he sailed to Sluis in 1599, establishing his base of operations there. A further eight galleys sailed from Spain under his command in 1602, to reinforce the squadron at Sluis, but only four of these made it to port. Two were lost en route in the Battle of Sesimbra Bay and two more during the Battle of the Narrow Seas (1602). On 26 May the following year, Spinola died in the Battle of Sluis (1603), bringing to an end his experiment in adopting Mediterranean naval warfare to northern waters.

A portrait of him was painted by Federico Barocci in 1595, and a poem by Francisco de Quevedo memorializes his exploits.
