= St James the Great Church =

Protestant church in the Netherlands

Coordinates: 51.4427°N 3.5744°E

- Grote Kerk; Sint Jacobskerk
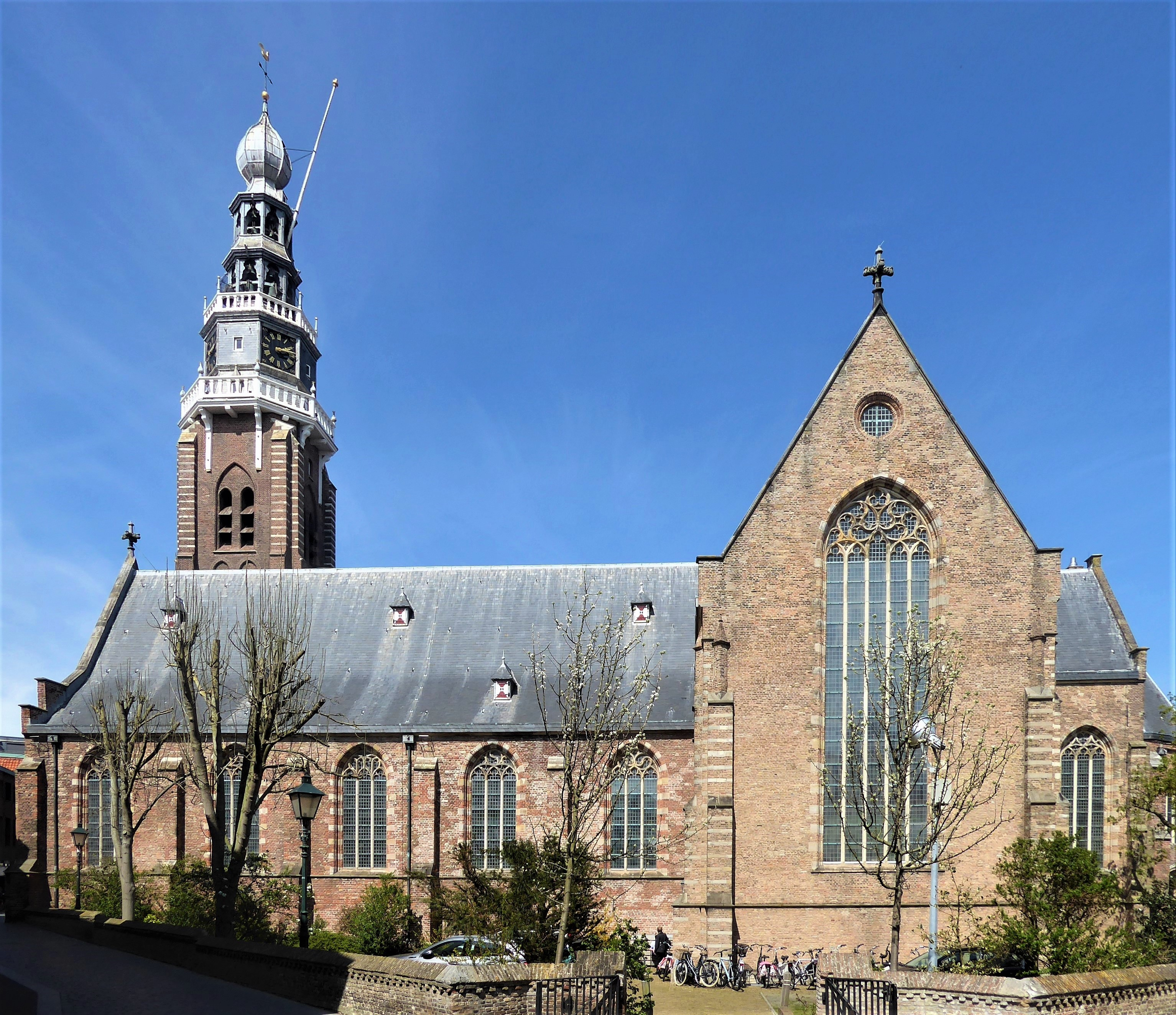
- St James' Church viewed from the south.
- St James the Great Church
- Location: Vlissingen
- Country: Netherlands
- Denomination: Protestant Church in the Netherlands
- Previous denomination: Dutch Reformed Church; Roman Catholic
- Website: sintjacobskerk.nl

Saint James the Great Church is a large Protestant church in the city of Flushing, Netherlands. The building is on the Old Market (Oude Markt); around are the streets called Branderijstraat and Lepelstraat. The original Roman Catholic church of the city, it has belonged to the Dutch Reformed Church since 1572, which became the Protestant Church in the Netherlands in 2004.

The church is pseudo-basilican in style; the aisles are almost as wide as the nave, the three aisles each have their own vault and the nave rises above the aisles, although a clerestory is missing.

== History ==
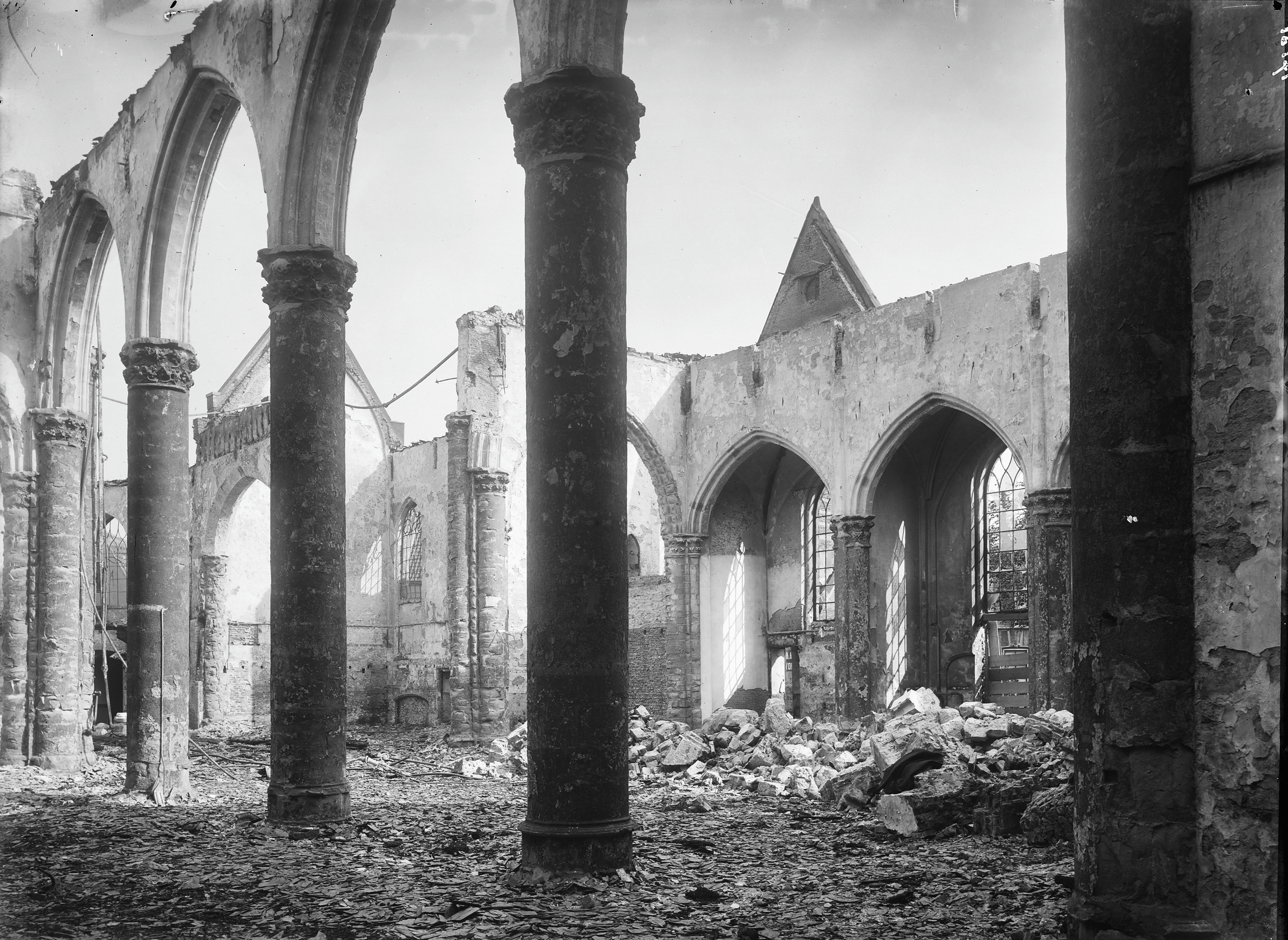
After the 1911 fire.

The church was built between 1308 and 1328. From this period dates the lower brick section of the tower . The Gothic spire was replaced by a wooden crown similar to the current one in 1501. The carillon in the tower is the fourth bells and dates from 1951 .

In 1911 a large fire broke out in which the church heavily damaged. The fire caused steeple to come crashing down and landed on the rest of the church building. A large part of the church has been lost, including the church's organs.

The northern transept was formerly designated for use by the English church. This section was screened by means of a wall. The old door is still visible in the Branderijstraat next to the presbytery. The English moved to the new English church on the site of the current city hall on Paulkrugerstraat in 1914.

== Interior ==
In the church, a number of tombstones lie in the side alcoves. Once there were 466 graves in the church but after the fire of 1911 only a small number were put back for decoration. There is in the one epitaph, eight gravestones, including that of Cornelis Lampsins, and a single tomb, in the shape of a needle, for Daniel Octavus Barwell, a passenger of the shipwrecked Woestduin.

In this church is Admiral Michiel de Ruyter was baptized and married. In 1957 a stained-glass window was dedicated to him in the church.

== Organs ==
In the church are three organs: the principal Flentrop organ (1968), the Slooff chamber organ (1971), and the Klop positive organ. The Flentrop organ is the successor to the Van Dam organ, purchased in 1916 following the fire of 1911. However, during the Second World War it was badly damaged. Before the fire in 1911 there was also an organ by Van Os (1769). The first organ was by Ramault, purchased in 1690.
