= Henry Dudley (conspirator) =

Vice-Admiral Sir Henry Dudley
- Born: 1517
- Died: 1568 (aged 50–51); London
- Relatives: Son of John Sutton, 3rd Baron Dudley and Cicely Grey
- Military career
- Allegiance: Kingdom of England
- Branch: Royal Navy
- Service years: 1536–1568
- Rank: Vice-Admiral
- Commands: Admiral of the Narrow Seas Captain of the Guard at Boulogne
- Conflicts: Boulogne; Battle of Cádiz (1596); Islands Voyage; Siege of Kinsale; Battle of Castlehaven; Battle of Sesimbra Bay
