= English ship Warspite (1596) =

English warship, built 1596

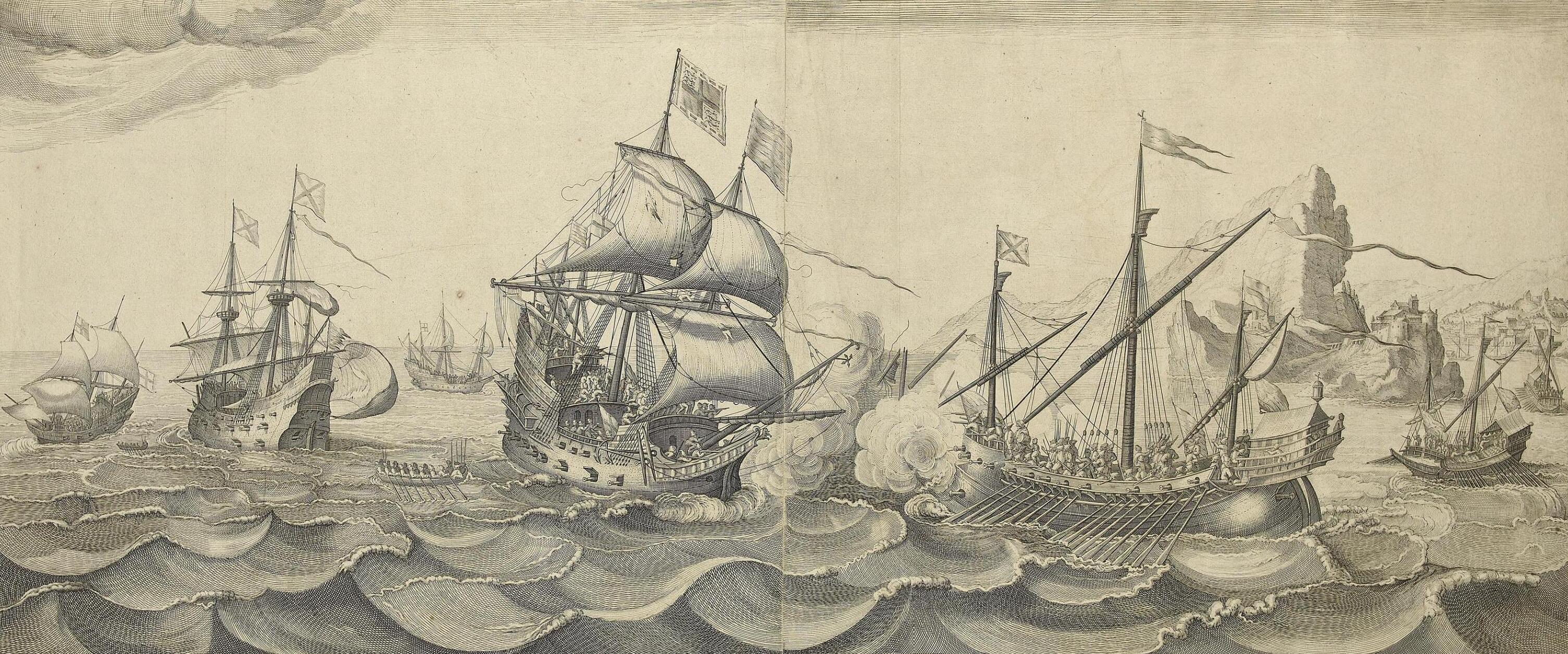
- Warspite at the Battle of Sesimbra Bay

History

England
- Name: Warspite
- Builder: Stevens
- Launched: 1596
- Fate: Sold, 1649
- Notes: Participated in: Battle of Cádiz; Islands Voyage; 3rd Spanish Armada; Fourth Spanish Armada; Battle of Castlehaven; Battle of Sesimbra Bay; Siege of La Rochelle

General characteristics as built
- Class & type: Great ship
- Tons burthen: 648 bm
- Length: 90 ft (27 m) (keel)
- Beam: 36 ft (11 m)
- Depth of hold: 16 ft (4.9 m)
- Sail plan: Full-rigged ship
- Complement: 300
- Armament: 32 guns, in 1603 comprising; 2 cannon periers, 2 demi-cannon, 14 culverins, 10 demi-culverins (br)and 4 sakers.

Warspite (also spelled Warspight) was a great ship (later classed as a second rate) of the English Tudor navy. (Note: The 'HMS' prefix was not used until the middle of the eighteenth century, but is sometimes applied as an anachronism.) The vessel was built at Deptford Dockyard by the master shipwright Edward Stevens and launched about 1 March 1596. She carried a crew of 300 when at sea, of whom 190 were classed as "mariners", manning the guns and fighting the ship; 80 as "sailors", working the sails and ancestors of present-day seamen and 30 "gunners", the armament specialists.

The origins of its name are unclear, although it is probably from the word spight – an Elizabethan-era spelling variation of both spite and speight – in part embodying contempt for the Navy's enemies, but which was also the common name for the green woodpecker, suggesting the 'Warspight' would poke holes in enemy ships' (wooden) hulls.

Following her launching, she was commissioned under Captain Sir Arthur Gorges and on 21 June she led, as flagship of Raleigh's expedition, one of the four squadrons to Cádiz, and in the same year fought in the Battle of Cádiz. In 1597 and three years later Warspite took part in expeditions which brought the indispensable loot of the New World.

She took part in the failed Islands Voyage hoping to intercept the Spanish treasure fleet in which Walter Raleigh sailed as Vice Admiral and commanded by Gorges. On its return to England it faced the Spanish Armada of 1597 which failed due to storms and the safe passage of the English fleet. Warspite, leaking from the same storm, captured two Spanish ships from the Armada off St Ives. The information given by the prisoners was vital on learning the Armada's objectives.

The galleon's next major battle took place during December 1601 in the Irish harbor of Castlehaven where an entire Spanish expedition sent to support the rebellion in Ireland was destroyed in the Battle of Castlehaven. In June 1602 she was off the coast of Spain again and began an attack on Cezimbra Bay near Lisbon (Portugal) which resulted at the Battle of Sesimbra Bay in the capture of a large carrack loaded with treasure valued at a million ducats.

The next event of Warspite's career was less happy—during 1627 she took part in the Duke of Buckingham's ill-fated Siege of La Rochelle to support the Huguenots at La Rochelle in western France. It ended in disaster and the galleon was reduced to a hulk. Warspite was relegated to harbour service in 1635 and was cut down to serve as a lighter. She was sold out of the navy in 1649.
