= Richard Leveson (admiral) =

English naval officer, politician, and landowner

Vice-Admiral Sir Richard Leveson
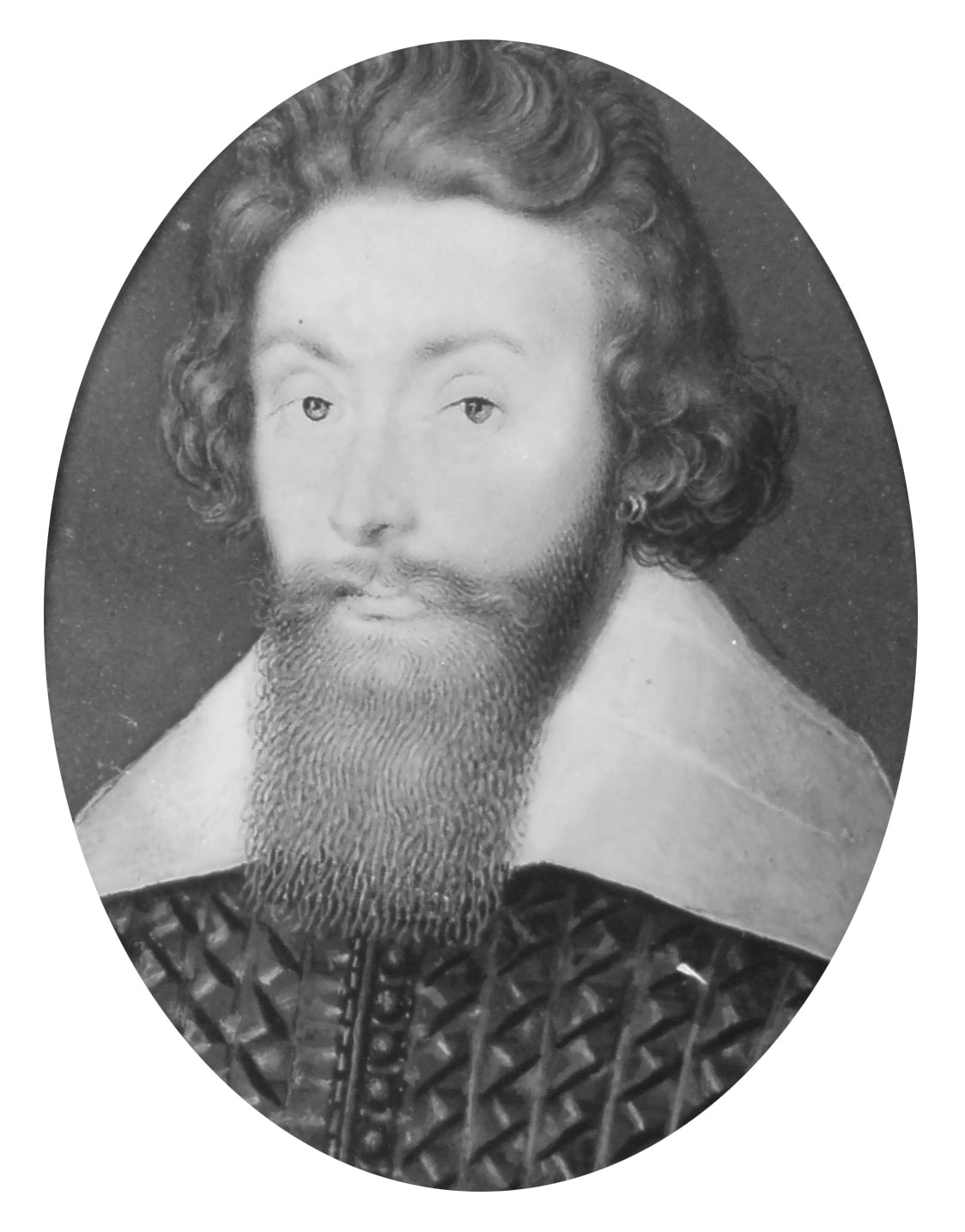
- Portrait of Leveson from a portrait miniature by Isaac Oliver
- Born: c. 1570
- Died: 2 August 1605; London, England
- Burial place: St Peter's Collegiate Church, Wolverhampton
- Relatives: Son of Sir Walter Leveson and Anne Corbet
- Military career
- Allegiance: England
- Branch: Royal Navy
- Service years: 1586–1605
- Rank: Vice-Admiral
- Commands: Admiral of the Narrow Seas
- Conflicts: Spanish Armada; Capture of Cádiz; Islands Voyage; Fourth Spanish Armada; Siege of Kinsale; Battle of Castlehaven; Battle of Sesimbra Bay

Vice-Admiral Sir Richard Leveson (c. 1570 – 2 August 1605) was a Royal Navy officer, politician and landowner. His origins were in the landed gentry of Shropshire and Staffordshire. A client and son-in-law of Charles Howard, 1st Earl of Nottingham, he became a vice-admiral under him. He served twice as MP for Shropshire in the House of Commons of England. He was ruined by the burden of debt built up by his father.

== Family background ==
Richard Leveson's parents were

- Sir Walter Leveson (1551-1602) of Lilleshall, Shropshire, son of Sir Richard Leveson (d.1560) and Mary Fitton (1529–1591). The family name is pronounced /ˈljuːsən/ LEW-sən, and could be rendered in many ways in the 16th century, including Lewson, Luson and Lucen. In the late Middle Ages, the Levesons were important wool merchants and minor landowners based in the Wolverhampton area. They became major landowners in Shropshire and Staffordshire mainly through the acquisition of former church lands by Walter's grandfather, James Leveson, after the Dissolution of the Lesser Monasteries. The most important estates were at Lilleshall, where James Leveson had bought first the Abbey and then the entire manor, and at Trentham, where James bought the lands of the dissolved priory. Walter was initially an enclosing and improving landlord, raising the family's profile still further, and serving as MP for Shropshire three times.

- Anne Corbet, the daughter of Sir Andrew Corbet of Moreton Corbet, who was vice-president of the powerful Council of Wales and the Marches. The Corbets were very important landowners in Shropshire, supplying knights of the shire through much of the reign of Queen Elizabeth: in concert with the Levesons, they could dictate the representation of Shropshire in the English parliament.

The Leveson and Corbet families were the most powerful of the landed gentry families in Shropshire, a county without a resident aristocracy. Both underwent a crisis in the late Elizabethan and Jacobean periods as a result of overspending and succession problems, coupled with unwise exposure to the vagaries of the State. In Richard Leveson's case, the problems stemmed almost entirely from his father's impulsive and irrational behaviour, stemming apparently from a serious mental illness.

== Naval career ==
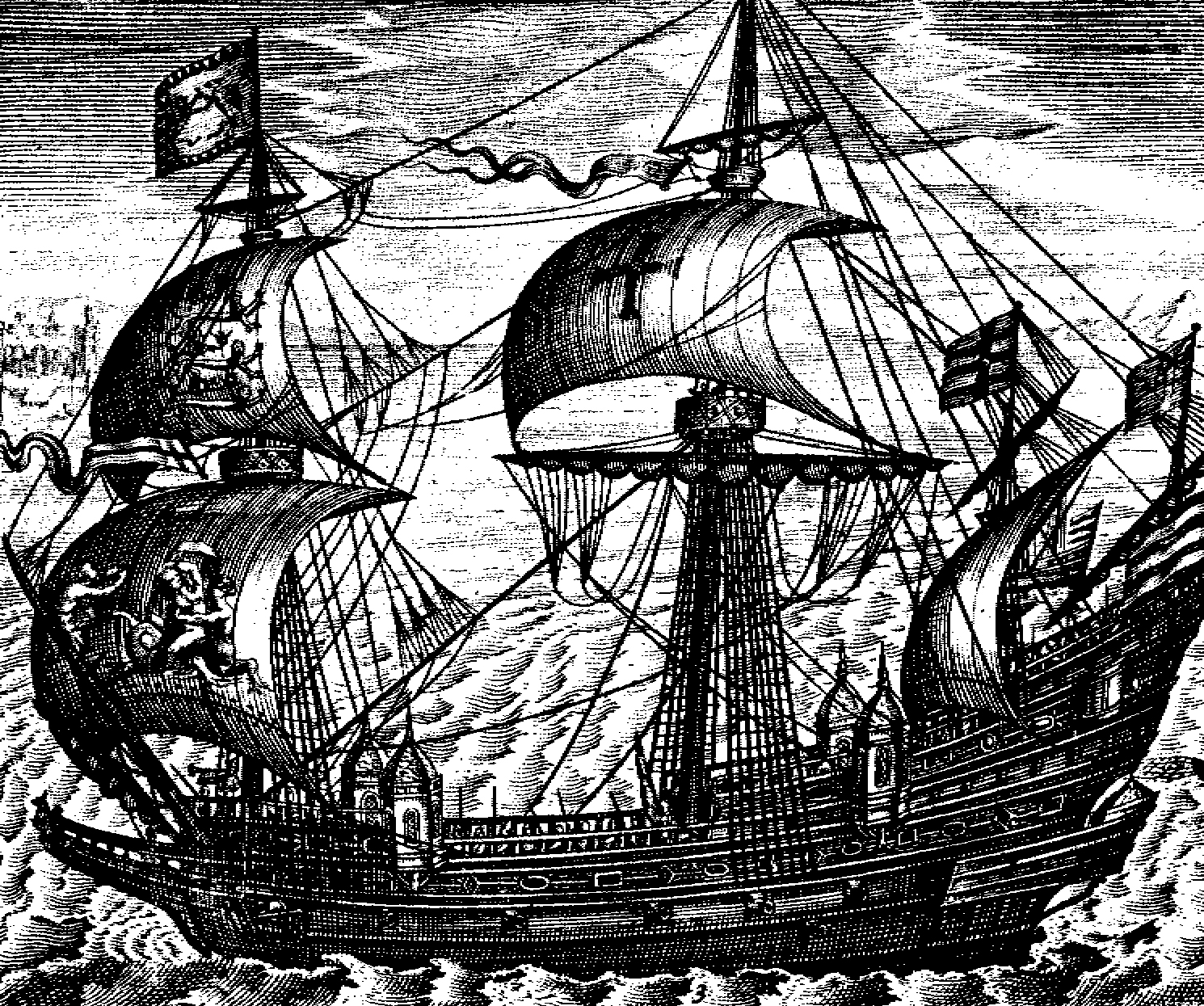
The Ark Royal (1587), by Claes Janszoon Visscher.

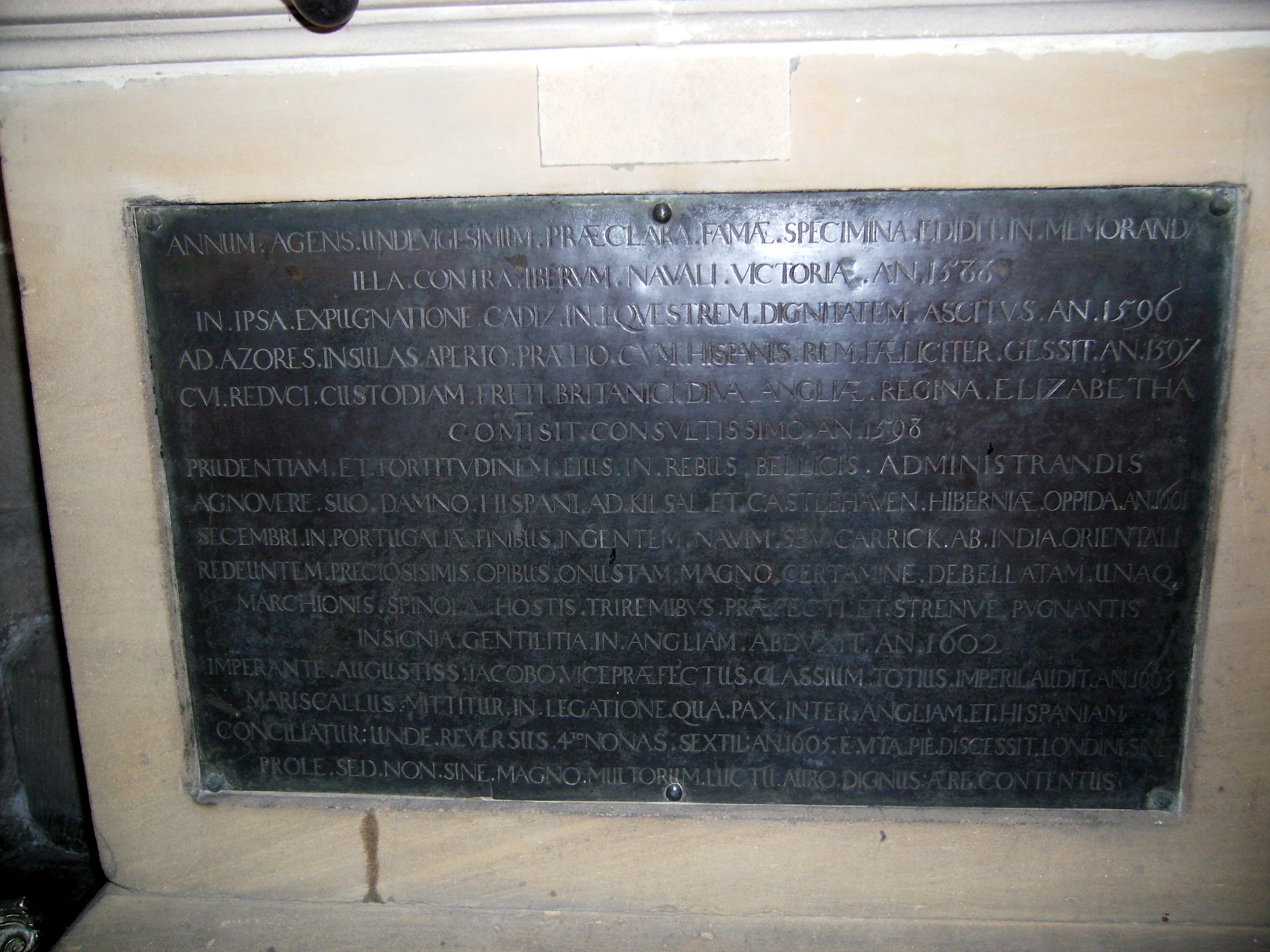
Inscription on memorial to Richard Leveson, giving career details.

Leveson took to the sea in his teenage years and his career was secured by marriage in 1587 to Margaret, the daughter of Charles Howard, 1st Earl of Nottingham, who had been appointed Lord High Admiral in 1585.

In 1588 Leveson served as a volunteer on board the Ark Royal against the Spanish Armada, and in 1596 had a command in the expedition against Cádiz, on which occasion he was knighted. In 1597 he is said to have commanded the Hope in 'the Islands' voyage' under Robert Devereux, 2nd Earl of Essex, though other lists describe him as commanding the Nonpareil. It is possible that he moved from one ship to the other during the expedition. In 1599 he commanded the Lion in the fleet fitted out, under Lord Thomas Howard, in expectation of a Spanish attempt at invasion. In 1600, with the style of 'admiral of the narrow seas,' he commanded a squadron sent towards the Azores to look out for the Spanish treasure-ships. Great care was taken to keep their destination secret; but the Spaniards, warned by experience, changed the route of their ships, and so escaped. In October 1601 he was appointed captain-general and admiral of certain of her Majesty's ships to serve against the Spaniards lately landed in Ireland. (Cal. State Papers, Ireland), and in the early days of December fought a battle off Castlehaven and forced his way into the harbour of Kinsale, where, after a severe action, he destroyed the whole of the enemy's shipping under Pedro de Zubiaur.

Early in 1602 Leveson was appointed to command a powerful fleet of nine English and twelve Dutch ships, which were to infest the Spanish coast. The Dutch ships were, however, late in joining, and Leveson, leaving his vice-admiral Sir William Monson, to wait for them, put to sea with only five ships on 19 March 1602. Within two or three days the queen sent Monson orders to sail at once to join his admiral, for she had word that 'the silver ships were arrived at Terceira.' They had, in fact, arrived and left again; and before Monson could join him Leveson fell in with them. With his very small force he could do nothing. 'If the Hollanders,' wrote Monson, 'had kept touch, according to promise, and the queen's ships had been fitted out with care, we had made her majesty mistress of more treasure than any of her progenitors ever enjoyed.' It was not till the end of May that the two English squadrons met with each other, and on 1 June, being then off Lisbon, they had news of a large carrack and eleven galleys in Cezimbra bay. Some of the English ships had been sent home as not seaworthy; others had separated; there were only five with Leveson when, on the morning of the 3rd, he found the Spanish ships both under the command of Federico Spinola and Álvaro de Bazán strongly posted under the guns of the castle. At ten o'clock he stood into the bay, and after a fight which lasted till five in the evening, two of the galleys were burnt, and the rest, with the carrack, Saõ Valentinho capitulated and were taken to England. The prize money from the carrack worth £3,000 was awarded by Queen Elizabeth.

In 1603, during the last sickness and after the death of the queen, Leveson commanded the fleet in the narrow seas, to prevent any attempt to disturb the peace of the country or to influence the succession being made from France or the Netherlands. This was his last service at sea. On 7 April 1604 he was appointed jointly Lieutenant of the Admiralty of England, and Vice-Admiral of England for life (ib. Dom.), and in the following year was marshal of the embassy to Spain for the conclusion of the peace. Shortly after his return he died in London.

== Member of Parliament ==
=== The parliament of 1589 ===
Richard Leveson was elected a member of the English parliament for the first time on 7 November 1588, sitting in the 1589 parliament. He was one of two members for the county of Shropshire, the other being his own father, Walter. In the previous election, in October 1586, Walter had been paired with Richard Corbet, his brother-in-law, and the two families had decisive influence over the choice of MP for several decades. At the time of his election he was only 18 years old, unusual but not unique in this period. The parliament lasted only from 4 February 1589 until 29 March. Leveson was not a prominent and the journals for the 1589 Parliament mention that he asked for leave of absence.

=== The parliament of 1604 ===
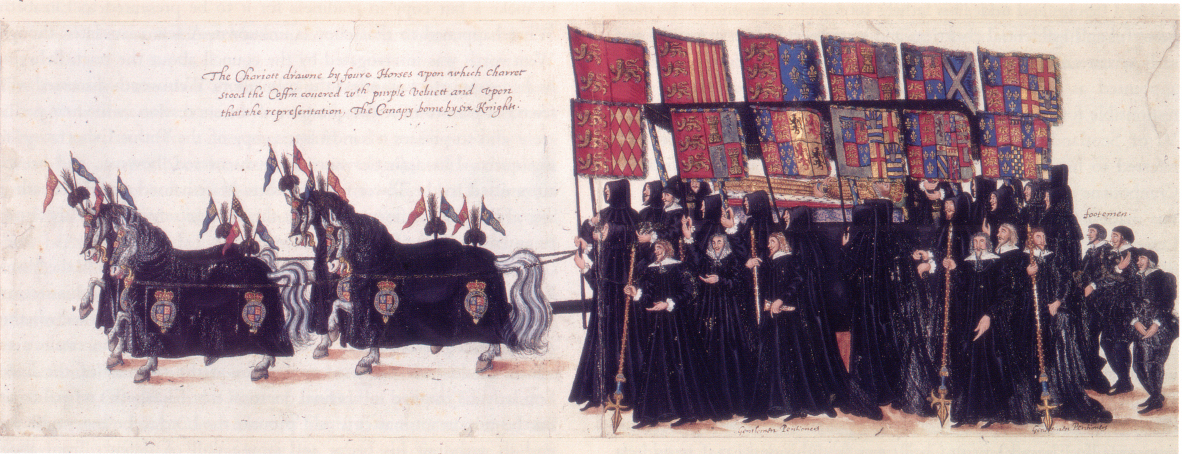
The funeral of Elizabeth I. Leveson was one of the six knights chosen to bear the canopy.

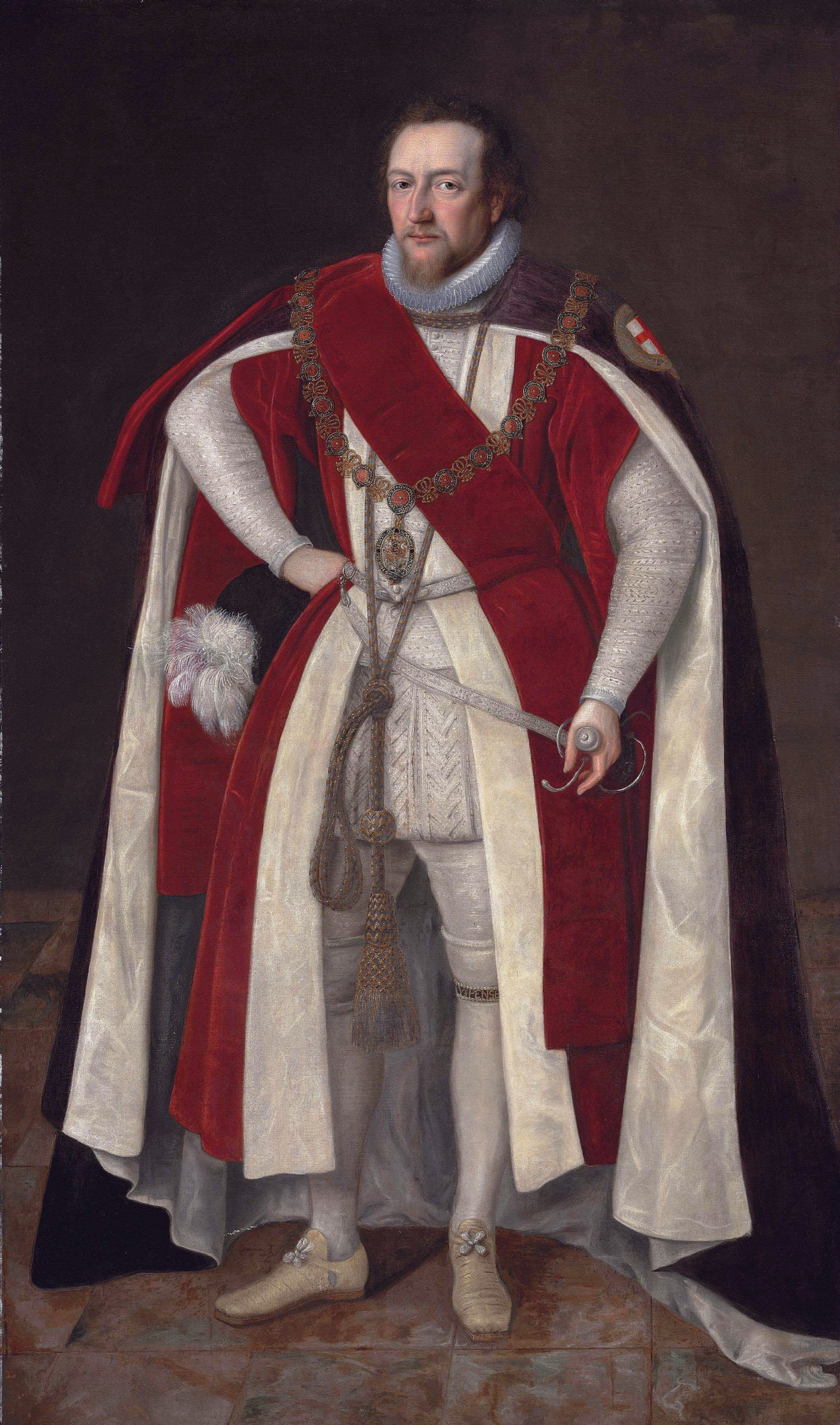
Henry Brooke, 11th Baron Cobham. The aftermath of his attainder was one of the issues facing the 1604 parliament that involved Leveson, as a client of the Howards.

The summoning of the first parliament of James I found Leveson at the height of his prestige. His capture of the Portuguese carrack was still fresh in the memory. At the funeral of Elizabeth I, he had acted as a knight of the canopy. On his arrival in London in May 1603, James I made Leveson a gentleman of the Privy chamber. Later that year, he was given the task of taking Thomas Grey, 15th Baron Grey de Wilton to Winchester for trial as a participant in the Bye Plot.

Throughout Elizabeth's reign, Shropshire had been represented by eight families, mainly based in the north of the county, of which the Levesons were one. Leveson must have seemed an obvious choice at the time and two of the prominent county gentry took the unusual step of countersigning the return to mark their approval: Vincent Corbet, Leveson's uncle, and Francis Newport. Newport's endorsement was significant: a former MP, and three times High Sheriff of Shropshire, he knew Leveson's difficulties well, as the Privy Council had sent him to arrest three of Sir Walter's servants in 1593. The second member was Robert Needham, a cousin of Leveson and Corbet whose family estates were mainly around Cranage in Cheshire but whose seat was Shavington Hall in Shropshire.

When the parliament assembled on 19 March 1604, Leveson was one of those deputed to administer the Oath of Supremacy to the rest of the House of Commons, He was soon nominated to two committees directly concerned with family affairs of his patron, the Earl of Nottingham. One was the committee to deal with the naturalization of Nottingham's wife. Leveson's mother-in-law had died shortly before the queen. The earl then married a Scottish woman, about fifty years his junior, Margaret Stuart, a daughter of the so-called "Bonny Earl", James Stewart, 2nd Earl of Moray. The second committee dealt with provision for Leveson's sister-in-law, Frances Howard, known as Lady Kildare, as she was the widow of Henry FitzGerald, 12th Earl of Kildare. Her second husband, Henry Brooke, 11th Baron Cobham had been condemned to death in November 1603 for his part in the Main Plot to install Lady Arbella Stuart on the throne. He was not executed but held in the Tower of London until his health broke down in 1617. As proposed by the committee, Parliament granted Cobham's lands to Lady Kildare.

Parliament also drew on Leveson's professional expertise. He was named to a committee dealing with the relief of soldiers and sailors who had served in the Irish war and to another on a bill to prohibit the export of iron artillery. The latter was one of a series of measures proposed by the highly experienced MP Robert Wroth, who had sought to set the agenda for the parliament by bringing forward a list of seven "grievances" or reform proposals around which he hoped to focus debate. The most important was a proposal to sweep away the abuses of the wardship system, but he also wanted reform of the Exchequer and elements of religious and social reform. Leveson was nominated to a committee to look at the whole programme proposed by Wroth, as well as to some of the committees on specific proposals. However, Wroth was a puritan, the last of the Marian exiles to serve in the House of Commons. His approach was not universally popular and there were powerful interests opposed to him in the Court and in the House of Lords, as well as cracks in his relationship with his patron, Robert Cecil. In the end, none of Wroth's program was carried.

Leveson was nominated to a committee to consider Union between the kingdoms of Scotland and England; another proposal that came to nothing at this stage. On 2 May there was a complaint the House's proceedings were not accurately reported to the king by those who had access to him. As a gentleman of the privy chamber, Leveson felt impelled to reply and stood up to do so. However, the puritan Sir Francis Hastings rose at the same time to press home the complaint. The House ruled in favour of Hastings and Leveson was forced to sit down. However, on 5 June he did address the House on a bill for the continuance and repeal of expiring statutes.

The Parliament was not dissolved and was to last until 1611. However, Leveson died before the next session was held in 1606. He was replaced as MP after a by-election by the immensely wealthy Shrewsbury lawyer and businessman Sir Roger Owen.

== Finances ==
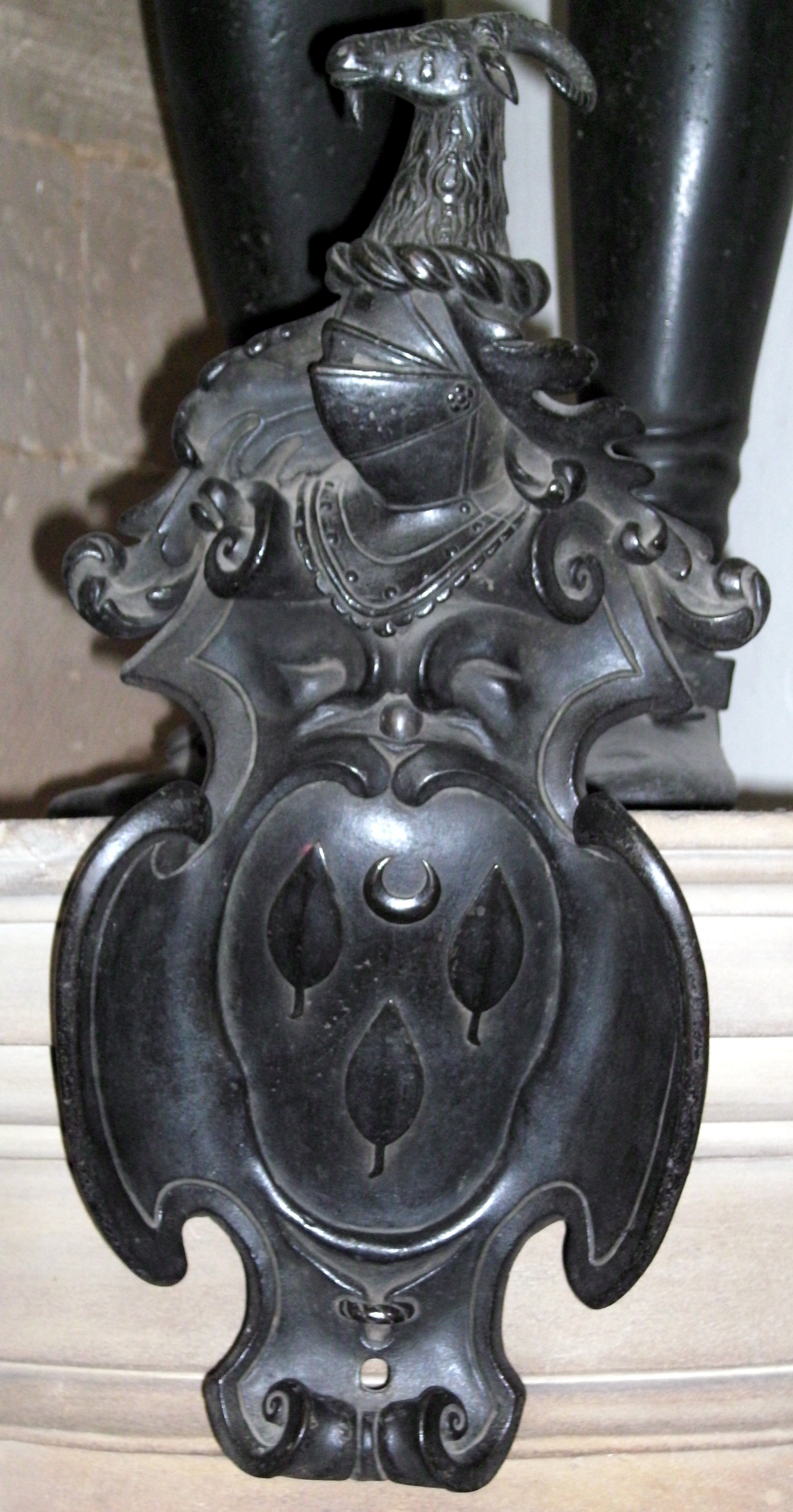
Leveson family coat of arms on a memorial to Leveson The leaves represent a pun on an incorrect but plausible pronunciation of the family name, as the shield has "leaves on" it.

For most of Richard Leveson's life he was heir to great estates, and in his later years he was forced to look on helpless as they were endangered and dissipated. He lived occasionally at Lilleshall, Trentham or Wolverhampton, but was on active service for long periods. Although his personal wealth was largely derived from his maritime activities, including his naval service, privateering and trade, he was appointed to some of the offices appropriate to the Staffordshire and Shropshire landed gentry. By 1594, at latest, he was a justice of the peace in both counties. In 1596 he was made Custos Rotulorum of Shropshire, the senior position in the civil administration of the county, and an important honour.

It was his father, Sir Walter Leveson, who placed the Leveson patrimony in great danger, as he was accused of piracy in 1587, and later of sorcery. Initially he took rational measures to increase his income but gradually declined mentally. From 1598 Sir Walter was incarcerated in the Fleet Prison. Although his great estates were still largely intact, they were endangered by the massive debts he incurred as a result of the compensation and fines he was ordered to pay. The debt grew from about £10,500 in 1591 to £12,000 a decade later. By this stage, Richard's mother, Anne Corbet, had died and Walter had married Susan Vernon, a cousin of Robert Devereux, 2nd Earl of Essex. Walter wrote to Essex asking that he or one of the Vernons be appointed trustee of the family estates. However, Walter was in the grip of a persecutory delusion. He claimed that he was the victim of a plot connected to jealousy of his second marriage. When Richard made suggestions, his father accused him of plotting with a man with the surname Ethell to ruin him. Convinced that the death of his daughter-in-law would somehow solve his problems, he grew poisonous plants at Lilleshall and made an attempt on her life.

Essex referred the Leveson case to Henry Howard, 1st Earl of Northampton, who engineered an agreement in June 1601. Richard Leveson was to take on his father's assets and liabilities in return for an annuity of £580, a generous allowance, as Sir John Leveson later valued the estates at only £600 a year. However, Sir Walter had to guarantee that there were no hidden liabilities. The agreement was never implemented because Richard suspected Sir Walter was plotting to transfer assets to his sister, Mary Curzon - a suspicion confirmed by Susan Vernon. He also foiled an attempt to transfer assets to his illegitimate half-sister, Penelope, by intercepting one of his father's servants. Writing to Robert Cecil in December 1601, Leveson pointed out that

"the miserable wrecks of my father's torn estate are well-known. His want of care, and my want of credit with him to take up loose ends before they ravelled into extremities, are the cause that my lands are now by forfeitures brought into the hands of strangers....What land soever I may discover in the Queen's service upon a foreign coast, I am never likely to see any profit of my own lands at home"

Not until 1602 did Leveson inherit the estates on the death of his father, imprisoned to the last in the Fleet. This did not end his problems, but only added to them, as he was now responsible for his father's vast debts. In 1603 he and his step-mother faced legal action from Sir Julius Caesar, who was trying to recover £800. Caesar was a dangerous opponent as he was a powerful and wealthy judge and government minister. The capture of the Portuguese carrack gave considerable relief, but the £3000 Leveson was awarded was far from sufficient to clear his debts. Worse, still it was later to create further financial difficulties.

By this time the wreck of Leveson's finances was complete, and he was forced to put the estates into the hands of trustees, headed by his first cousin, Sir John Leveson of Halling, Kent. Sir John Leveson made progress, but little was achieved before the death of Sir Richard Leveson, less than three years later.

Rumours then began to circulate that Sir Richard had actually been fabulously wealthy as a result of his seafaring profits. In 1607 Leveson's cabin steward, Walter Grey, claimed that Leveson had concealed and stolen vast quantities of calico and pearls from the carrack - goods which did not form part of his share but rightly belonged to the queen. He alleged that Leveson had a vast cache of pearls in a barn at Sheriffhales, near his Lilleshall estate. Altogether, it was calculated, Leveson had defrauded the queen of goods to the value of £40,000. This was an overwhelming problem for Sir John Leveson, who had no hope of extracting such a vast sum from the estates. He investigated further and was able to undermine trust in Grey's story by bringing witnesses to testify that he had ended on bad terms with Leveson. He then uncovered further evidence that Grey had been given a deed promising £450 out of any fine connected with the carrack affair. The deed had been drawn up by Thomas Sackville, 1st Earl of Dorset, the Lord High Treasurer and a Scottish courtier called Sir James Creighton. Dorset had an interest in exerting leverage on the Leveson estate, as his grandson Edward Sackville was engaged to marry Richard Leveson's cousin, Mary Curzon: the daughter of the Mary Curzon who had earlier conspired with Sir Walter, and heiress of Sir George Curzon of Croxall Hall, Derbyshire. Discovery of the deed meant that Sir John was able to discredit Grey, who had a financial interest in perjuring himself, but doubts lingered and he was up against the most powerful faction in government. He was still faced by a large fine, albeit reduced to £5000.

After Sir John's death in 1615, his widow, Christian, took up the challenge of stabilising the Leveson family finances. After numerous further setbacks, she paid off the debts in 1623. This allowed the estates to pass later that year to Sir Richard Leveson's designated heir, the son of Sir John and Christian, and another Sir Richard Leveson.

== Death and succession ==
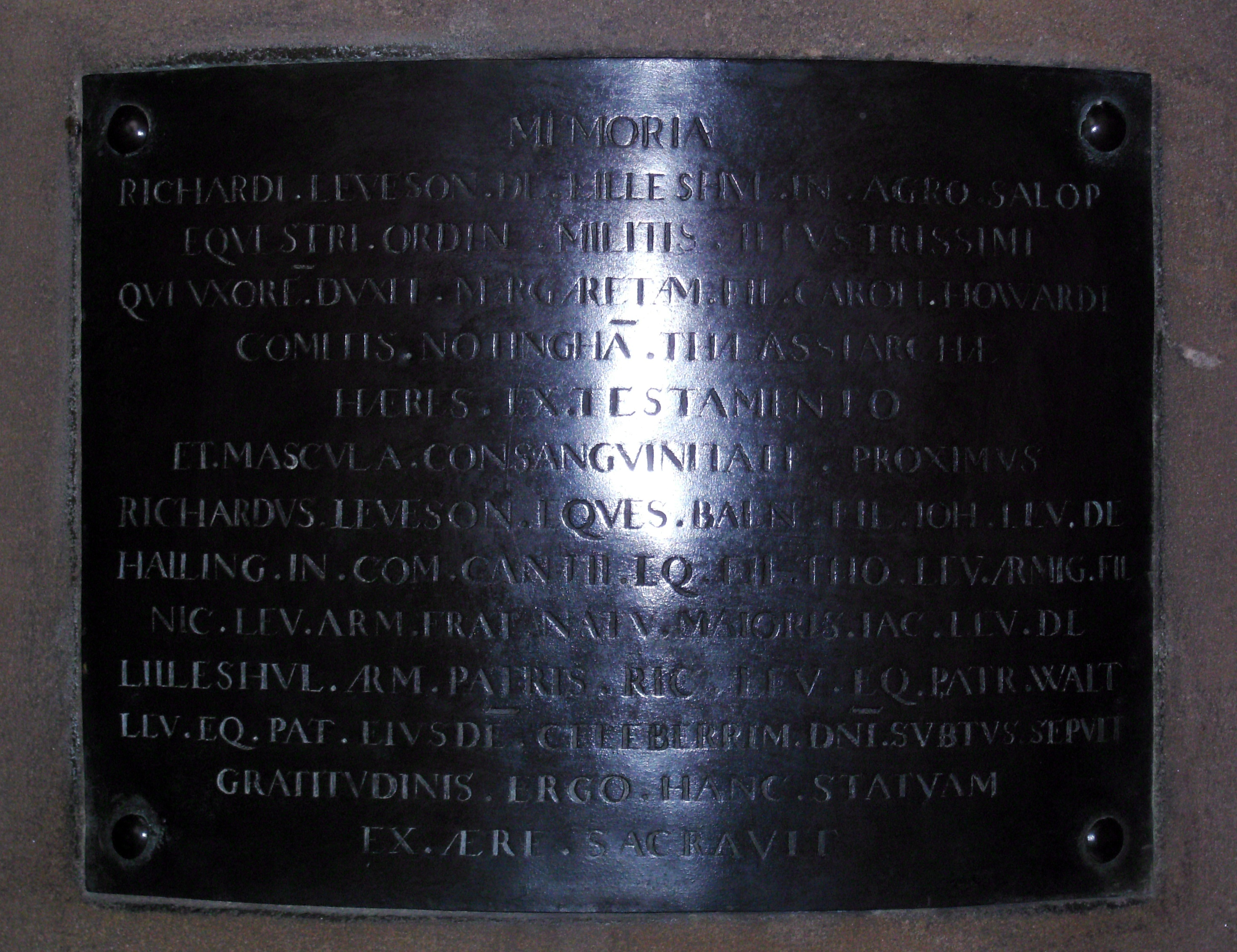
Inscription on Leveson's memorial, giving family details, including marriage and succession.

Richard Leveson fell ill while staying in the home of a friend, Hugh Bunnell, next to St. Clement's, Temple Bar, on 22 July 1605. Initially he complained of fever. This was complicated by constant diarrhoea and he died on 2 August 1605. He was buried on 2 September in St Peter's Collegiate Church, Wolverhampton.

Leveson had made his will on 17 March 1605. In it he chose to characterise life in terms of the travails of landholding:

"calling to mind the uncertainty of all earthly things, and that we hold and enjoy ourselves together with all our temporal blessings but as tenants at will to our good God that gave them."

Always alive to the possibility of death on active service, on 23 March he had also drawn up a deed conveying all his property to a group of trustees headed by his friend and distant relative, Sir Robert Harley, who were responsible for raising £10,000 to settle his debts. A second deed on the same date named his heirs. As he had no male issue, he left the bulk of his property to his godson and third cousin, Richard Leveson (1598–1661), son of Sir John Leveson (d.1615), who had once shared in his privateering activities. However, also named as heir was Leveson's illegitimate daughter, Anne Fitton, who he hoped would marry the young Richard Leveson. Richard Leveson went on to become a Member of Parliament and a prominent royalist soldier in the English Civil War. However, he married Katherine Dudley, leaving his benefactor's plan in tatters. Leveson's will also awarded £1000 to Penelope, his illegitimate half-sister, whom he had previously managed to exclude from inheriting from his father's property.

== Marriage and family ==
At the age of 17, Leveson married by licence, dated 13 December 1587, Margaret, daughter of the Charles Howard, 1st Earl of Nottingham and Catherine Carey. The couple had one child, who died while young. Margaret later suffered increasingly from a mental disorder, allegedly because of the loss of her child, although she also suffered at least one attempt on her life by father-in-law. As Richard Leveson lay dying, her father wrote to Robert Cecil asking for her wardship.

"I am very sorry to have such a subject to write of, which is that my son Lewson is most dangerously sick and to be much doubted of his recovery. For he is the weakest man that ever I saw and is still in the extremity of the burning fever and now in a very great looseness. There is little hope of him. And as you know my poor daughter, his wife, in what case of weakness she is; and I know how ready men are to seek after such things at his Majesty's hands, and because I know it chiefly concerns your offer, although I know her state is not so weak as by law she can be found so imperfect, yet I would be loth it should come in question being my daughter. Therefore in your love to me prevent it and let me have the custody of my own daughter, that her imperfection which it has pleased God to lay on her may not be so known to my great grief in the end of my years. It is well known what she was till God called her only child away, which her nature and weak spirit could not resist; and with all that, which you know of, her bad father-in-law's dealing with her, whom God forgive for it. If God call him, the King shall lose a worthy servant and myself one that I accounted rather my natural son than a son-in-law. Good my lord, you are a father and therefore you best know my case in this.—Chelse, 2 August."

The wardship was instead granted to her brother, William Howard, 3rd Baron Howard of Effingham. Margaret's wardship finally passed to her father after Effingham's death in 1615.

In the final years of his life, Leveson set up home at Perton, near Wolverhampton, with the noted courtesan Mary Fitton, the daughter of Sir Edward Fitton of Gawsworth, Cheshire (1548-1606) and Alice Holcroft (d.1627). They were second cousins: Leveson's paternal grandmother was also called Mary Fitton. They had a daughter, Anne, for whom Leveson sought to provide in his will. Mary Fitton continued to reside at Perton after Leveson's death, marrying another naval officer, Captain William Polewhele. The affair with Mary Fitton appears to have had no effect on Leveson's personal or political relations with Lord Howard, who continued to write of him as a son.

In January 1605 Leveson talked to one of the royal physicians, and had courtiers praise Mary Fitton's sister Anne Newdigate to the pregnant Anne of Denmark in an unsuccessful attempt to get her made nurse to Princess Mary.

== Portraiture ==
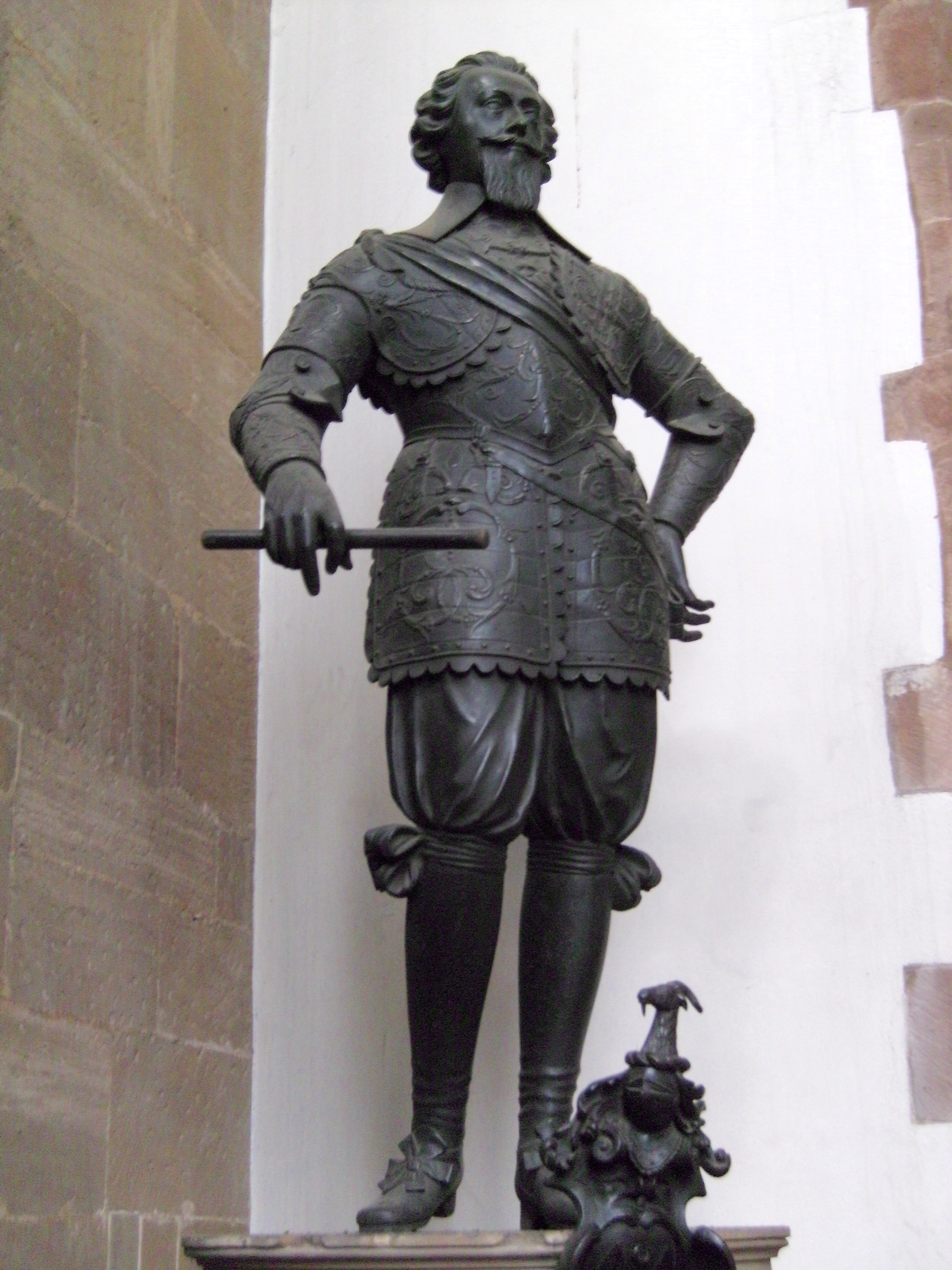
Statue of Leveson by Hubert Le Sueur in the St Peter's Collegiate Church

There are three examples of a portrait miniature of Leveson by the Huguenot artist Isaac Oliver, apparently all painted personally by Oliver towards 1600, one of which is held by the Wallace Collection. They are regarded as typical of the style of Oliver, who studied under Nicholas Hilliard, the leading English miniaturist of the period. Oliver went on to become the official miniaturist to Anne of Denmark.

St Peter's Collegiate Church has a striking statue and monument to Leveson. The bronze statue is by Hubert Le Sueur, another Huguenot artist who made a career in England. It originally formed part of a family group in the chancel. After damage during the English Civil War, it was detached and reassembled in the lady chapel. A bronze plaque now recites Leveson's main naval achievements, while another gives details of his family connections. Le Sueur went on to work for Charles I, producing a well-known equestrian statue of him now at Charing Cross.

A portrait of Sir Richard Leveson, said to be by Anthony van Dyck, belongs to the Duke of Sutherland, the head of the Leveson-Gower family. Probably this painting was of the Royalist Member of Parliament, Sir Richard Leveson. This later Sir Richard was the uncle of Lady Christian (Leveson) Temple who had married the Duke of Buckingham and Chandos's ancestor, Sir Peter Temple. This portrait was purchased for £65 02s 00p from the sale of the possessions of the Dukes of Buckingham and Chandos held at Stowe House, Buckinghamshire in 1848. It was described in the sale catalogue as by Van Dyck (whereas other paintings are described as 'after Van Dyck' or a 'copy of Van Dyck'). The catalogue records that Sir Richard is shown 'in a black dress, with a frill'and that the painting was 'bought 'after a very active competition.'
