= Battle of the Channel =

1605 naval battle

Battle of the Channel (1605)
- Part of the Eighty Years War
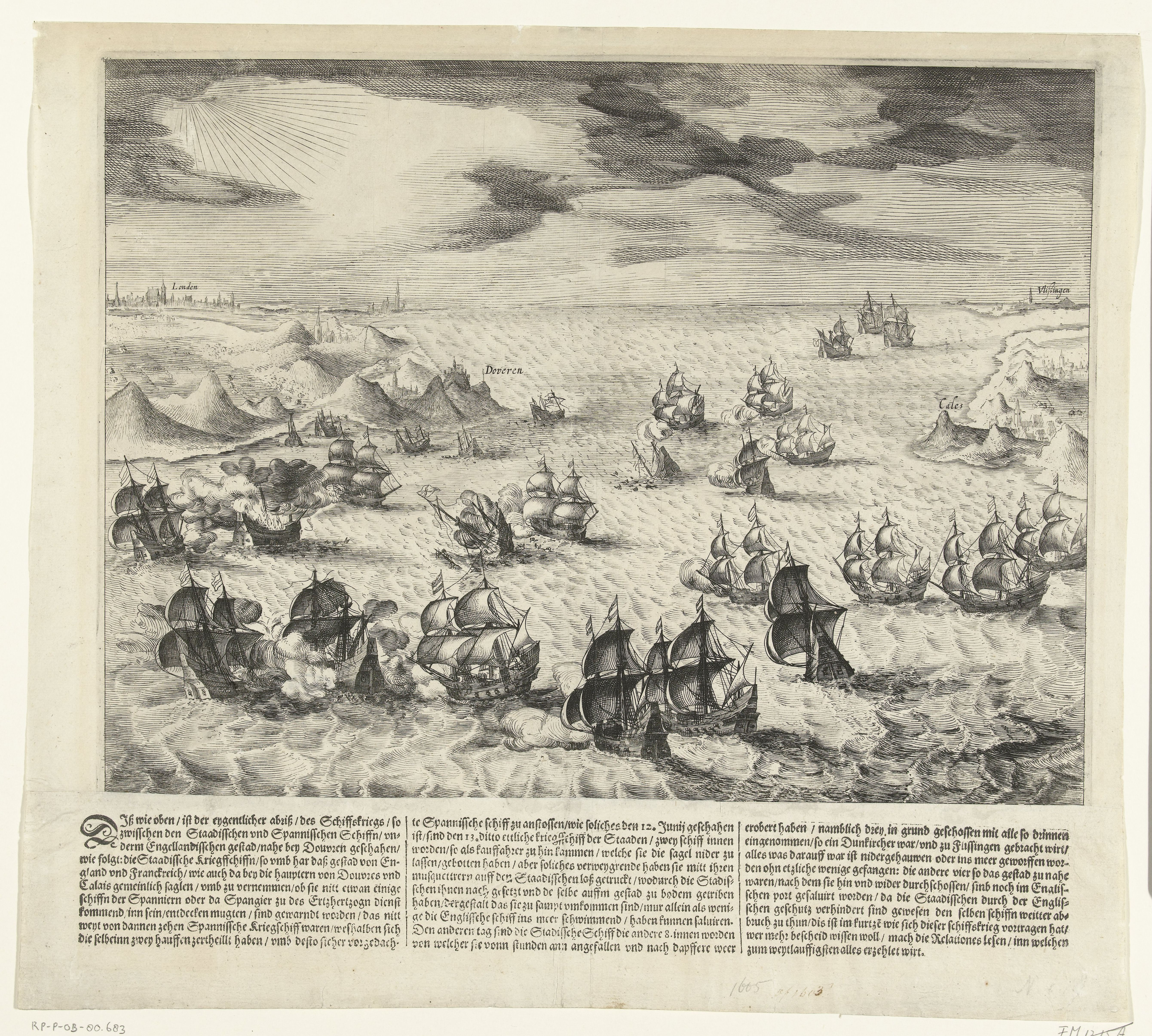
- 'Naval battle between Dutch and Spanish ships in the Channel, 1605'. From a Dutch print.
Date	July 1605
Location	English Channel
Result	Dutch victory

Belligerents
Spain	Dutch Republic

Commanders and leaders
Pedro de Zubiaur (DOW)	Willem de Zoete

Strength
12 galleons 2 frigates	80 ships

Casualties and losses
2 galleons sunk 400 dead	Several ships sunk

The Battle of the Channel was a 1605 naval engagement in the English Channel between a Spanish transport fleet captained by Pedro de Zubiaur and the Dutch armada under Willem de Zoete. The Spanish fleet carried a tercio under Pedro de Sarmiento for the Eighty Years' War, which the Dutch attempted to intercept and destroy. Zubiaur managed to break through overwhelming numerical superiority with a few of his ships and take refuge in Dover, England. However, many of the troops he transported were captured by the Dutch or died in England. The battle was the last deployment of Zubiaur, who died in Dover from his wounds, after which the remaining troops reached their destination in Dunkirk in English ships.

== Background ==
On May 24, 1605, Zubiaur sailed off from Lisbon at the head of eight galleons and two frigates, with the mission to carry 2400 tercio soldiers under maestre de campo Pedro de Sarmiento to Dunkirk. On their way through the English Channel, they were intercepted by an enormous 80-ship fleet of Dutch admiral Willem de Zoete. Learning about Willem's presence, four additional Spanish galleons were sent from Dunkirk to link with Zubiaur and arrived in time.

== Battle ==
Witnessing the disproportion of strengths, Zubiaur ordered the Spanish carriers to head for the allied English port of Dover while he performed a diversionary attack with his own flagship and several other ships readied to fight. Zubiaur and his vessels faced the first 18 Dutch ships in battle for more than a day, sinking multiple enemy ships and dismasting others, which allowed them to follow the rest of the fleet to Dover. Willem attempted to give chase, but the local cannons forced him to withdraw. In exchange for the damage inflicted, Zubiaur had lost two galleons and was wounded himself.

== Aftermath ==
Zubiaur received medical attention in Dover, but he died of his wounds on August 2, 1605. However, his leadership had been instrumental to save the rest of the fleet. Resuming the travel and crossing the Strait of Dover proved difficult for the rest of the fleet, which was entertained by diplomatic trouble with King James VI and I and the presence of Dutch ships, but after finally wintering in England, they crossed to Dunkirk in December. The troops he had transported who were still alive were carried to Flanders in English ships.
