= Battle of the Bay of Biscay (1592) =

Battle of the Anglo-Spanish War

- Part of the Anglo-Spanish War (1585–1604)
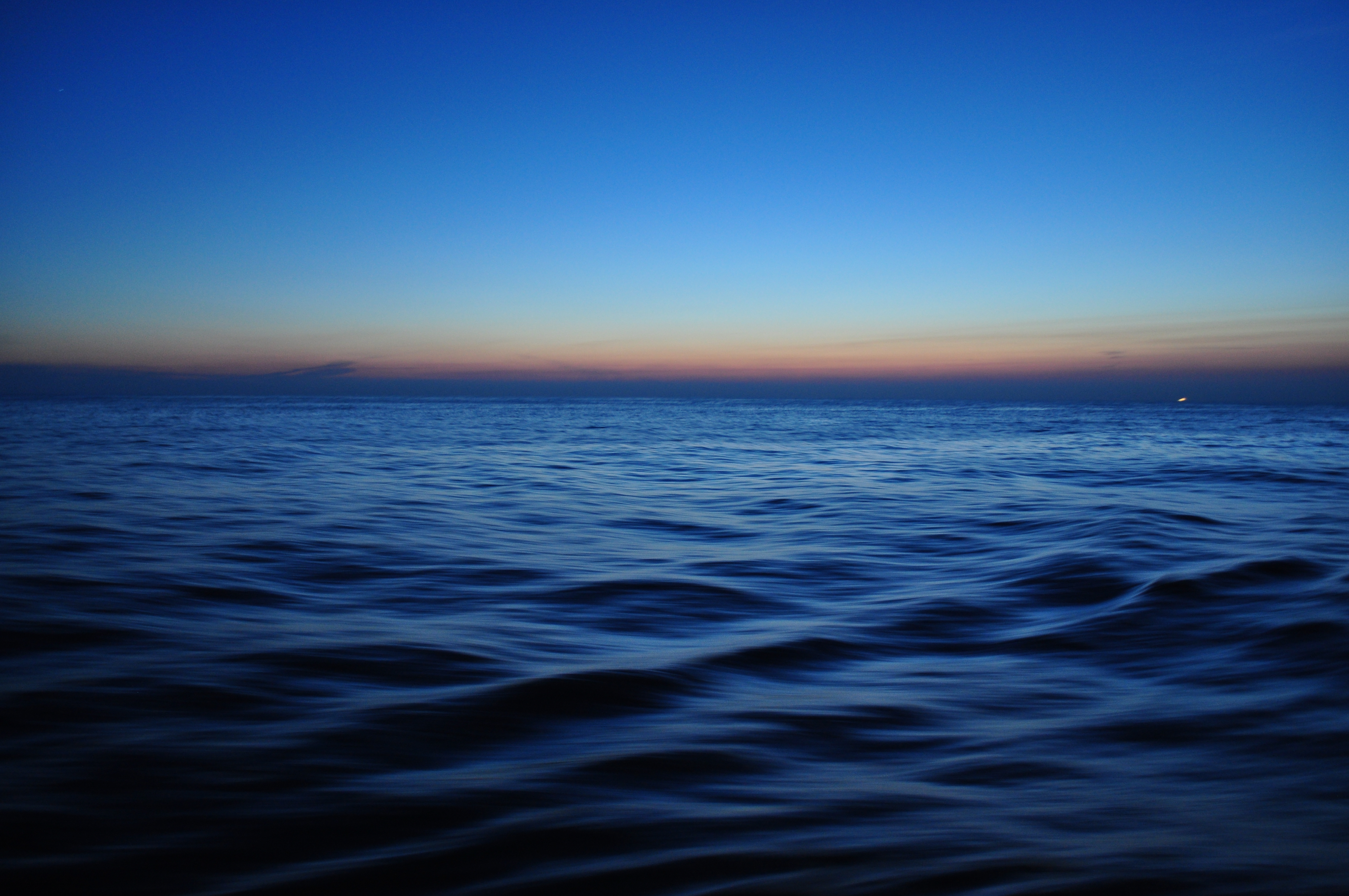
- Photography of the Bay of Biscay by Tom Bayly.
Date	November 1592
Location	Bay of Biscay, Atlantic Ocean
Result	Spanish victory

Belligerents
England	Spain

Commanders and leaders
Unknown	Pedro de Zubiaur

Strength
6 warships 40 merchant ships	5 flyboats

Casualties and losses
Flagship boarded and burned Several ships damaged 3 ships captured	1 flyboat damaged

The Battle of the Bay of Biscay of 1592 was a naval engagement that took place in waters of the Bay of Biscay, in November 1592, between a Spanish naval force of 5 flyboats commanded by Captain Don Pedro de Zubiaur and an English convoy of 40 ships, supported by a 6-warship squadron, as part of the Brittany Campaign during the Anglo-Spanish War (1585–1604) and the French Wars of Religion. The Spanish force led by Captain Zubiaur, despite being outnumbered, engaged the English ships, achieving a resounding success. The English flagship was boarded and burned, causing great confusion among the English convoy. Shortly after, another English force composed of six warships (sent by Queen Elizabeth I of England to Bordeaux to support the French Protestants), arrived at the battle, and tried to defend the convoy. After long and intense fighting, the Spaniards were victorious in battle, and three more English ships were captured, besides several ships seriously damaged.

The next year, on 18 April, in the same waters, another English naval force, commanded by Admiral Wilkenson, was defeated by Zubiaur's naval forces off the coasts of Blaye, a town besieged by land and sea by Protestant forces in the context of the French Wars of Religion.

== See also ==
- Bay of Biscay
- Battle of Blaye
- Battle of Cornwall
- French Wars of Religion
