= Battle of Blaye =

1593 naval battle

Coordinates: 45.1300°N 0.6700°W

Battle of Blaye (1593)
- Part of the Anglo-Spanish War (1585–1604) and the French Wars of Religion
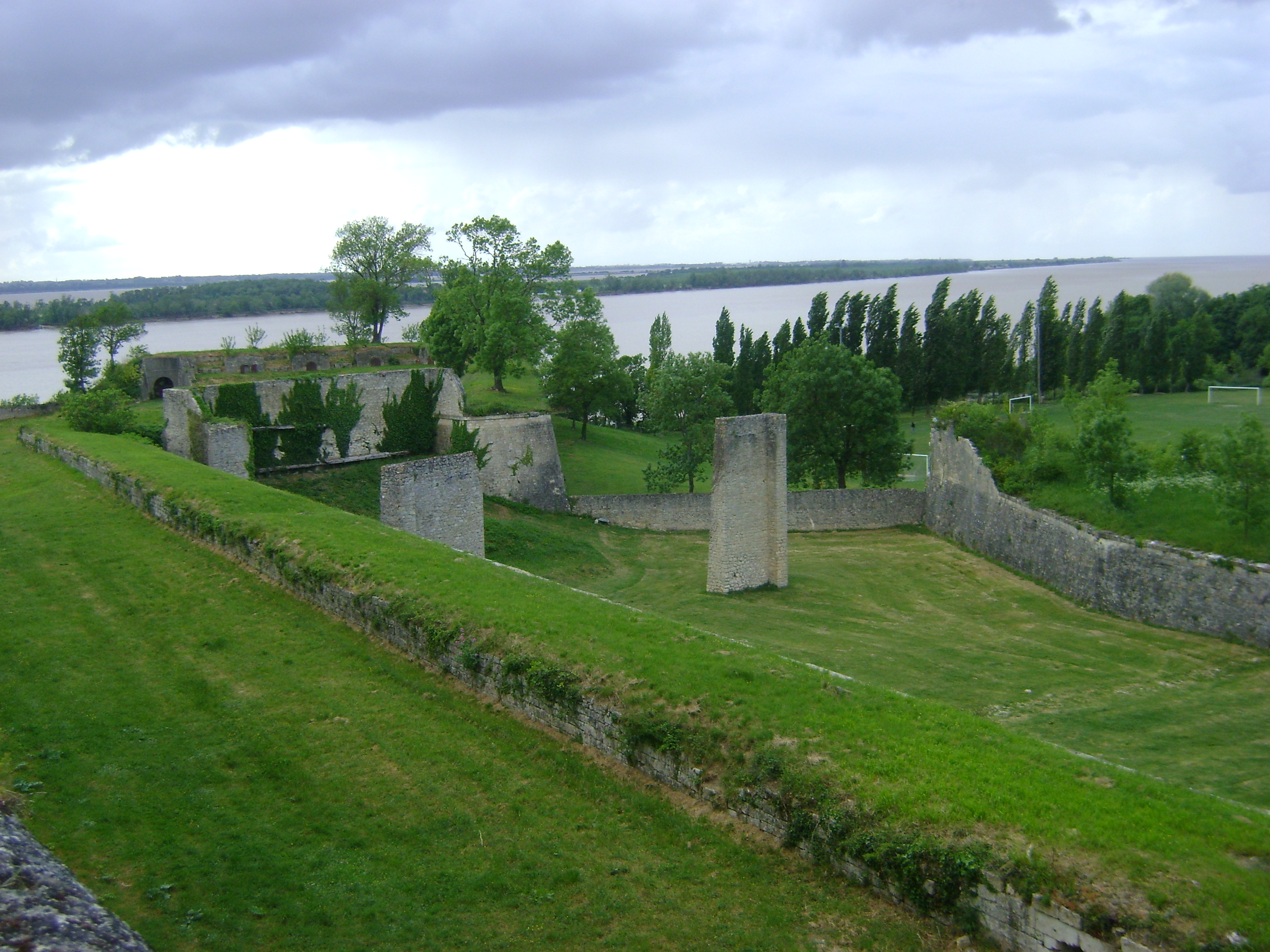
- View of the Gironde Estuary from the ruins of the Citadel of Blaye (2010)
Date	18 April 1593
Location	Off Blaye, Gironde Estuary, France
Result	Spanish victory

Belligerents
England; Supported by: (Kingdom of France) France of Henry IV	Spain

Commanders and leaders
Admiral Wilkenson †; Vice-Admiral Brailford †; Captain Limaille	Pedro de Zubiaur; Joanes de Villaviciosa

Strength
First battle: 6 galleons Supported by: 11–19 to 40–60 French and English ships (Including 6 galleasses)	First battle: 4 pinnaces Spanish fleet: 16 flyboats and pinnaces

Casualties and losses
2 galleons sunk (Flagship destroyed); Several ships damaged and 6 English merchant vessels captured	2 ships burned

The Battle of Blaye of 1593, also known as the Battle of Bec d'Ambès (in French) or Battle of the Gironde Estuary, was a naval Spanish victory that took place on 18 April 1593 off Blaye and Bec d'Ambès, Gironde Estuary, France, during the seven-month siege of Blaye between the French-Protestant forces of Henry of Navarre and the French-Catholic garrison of the city led by Governor Jean-Paul d'Esparbès de Lussan d'Aubeterre, in the context of the Brittany Campaign during the French Wars of Religion and the Anglo-Spanish War (1585–1604).

== Background ==
In 1592, some ships were acquired by farmer Peter Houghton and a group of London merchants, to help Marshal Matignon attack Leaguer Blaye and defend the Gironde against a Spanish squadron from Pasajes. Of these, six were English warships commanded by Admiral Wilkinson, Vice-Admiral Brailford and captains Johnson, Meriall, Bower and Courtney.

== Battle ==
In April 1593, a Spanish naval force of 16 warships (flyboats and pinnaces) commanded by Admiral Pedro de Zubiaur and General Joanes de Villaviciosa Lizarza set out to relieve Blaye. The city was controlled by the Catholic League of France, but under heavy siege by French Royal troops, supported by English and Huguenot forces, commanded by Marshal Matignon, and blocked by sea by six English warship-squadron under Admiral Wilkenson. On 18 April the English naval force was defeated and dispersed by Zubiaur's fleet, and the Spanish troops disembarked at Blaye, relieving the Catholic forces. In the naval engagement, the English warships of Admiral Wilkinson and Vice-Admiral were boarded by the Spaniards, burnt and destroyed, whilst two Spanish flyboats named Fortuna and Grifo were also sunk.

Soon after, another Anglo-French fleet of 11 to 19 warships from Bordeaux, supported by about 40 small vessels (including six galleasses from the port of La Rochelle), arrived at Blaye, trying to block the Spanish fleet. After a fierce and unequal battle, amid an intense storm, the Spaniards were victorious, with significant loss of life on both sides due to heavy musket fire. In the end, many ships of both fleets were dispersed by the storm, and the Spanish fleet managed to return safely to the port of Pasajes.

For his part in the fighting, Pedro de Zubiaur was decorated by King Philip II of Spain, receiving the title of "de general como a lo demás de escuadra para que antes que muera deje esto a los míos".

On 14 July the same year another Spanish force, composed of six pinnaces, under the command of Joanes de Villaviciosa Lizarza, and 120 soldiers led by Captain Antonio Manrique de Vargas, sailed from the Basque port of Castro Urdiales, to reinforce the Catholic forces of Blaye. After the Spanish troops under Villaviciosa launched a successful assault against the Protestant positions, which resulted in over 800 Protestants killed or wounded, the siege finally ended with the withdrawal of the French-Protestant troops.

== See also ==
- Battle of Craon
- Battle of the Bay of Biscay (1592)
- Siege of Fort Crozon
- Battle of Cornwall
- French Wars of Religion
- Catholic League of France

== Bibliography ==
- Bruce Wernham, Richard. List and Analysis of State Papers, Foreign Series: May 1592-June 1593. H.M. Stationery Office, 1964.
- Fernández Duro, Cesáreo (1898). Armada Española desde la unión de los reinos de Castilla y Aragón. Vol. III. Madrid. (in Spanish)
- José Ortiz y Sanz. Historia General de España. Vol. VII. Third Edition, Madrid (1846). (in Spanish)
- Gustav Ungerer. A Spaniard in Elizabethan England: The Correspondence of Antonio Pérez's Exile. Vol. I. London 1974. ISBN 0-900411-84-8
- Mac Caffrey, Wallace T. (1994). Elizabeth I: War and Politics, 1588–1603. Princeton University Press. USA. ISBN 978-0-691-03651-9
- Ortega y Medina, Juan Antonio. El conflicto anglo-español por el dominio oceánico. National Autonomous University of Mexico. 1994. ISBN 968-58-0150-9 (in Spanish)
- Gracia Rivas, Manuel. En el IV Centenario del fallecimiento de Pedro Zubiaur, un marino vasco del siglo XVI. Itsas Memoria. Untzi Museo Naval. San Sebastián 2006. (in Spanish)
