= Jacob van Wassenaer Duivenvoorde =

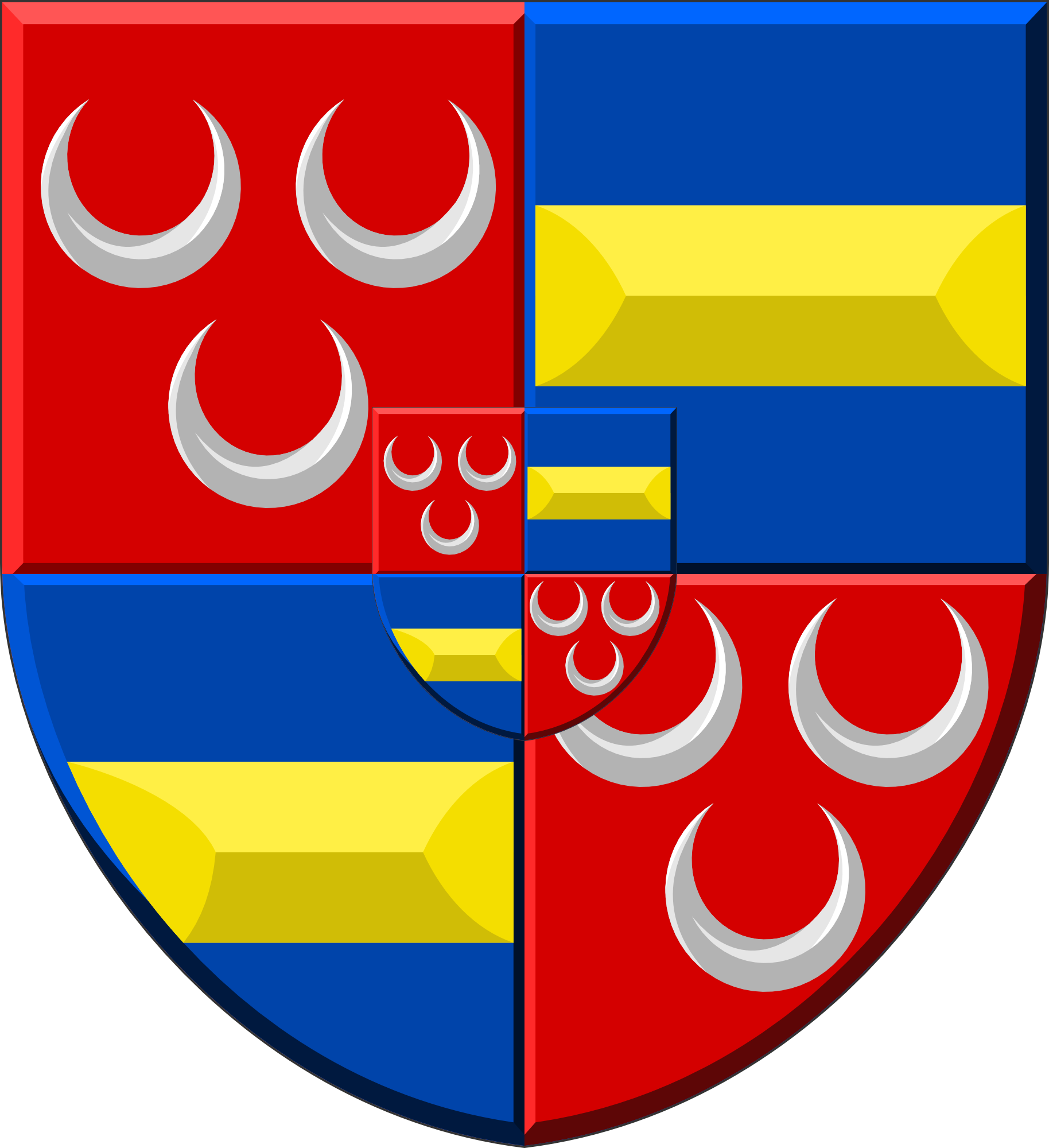
Coat of arms of Van Duvenvoorde & Van Wassenaer Obdam

Jacob van Wassenaer Duivenvoorde, lord of Obdam (1574, Haarlem – 31 August 1623, Heusden), was a Dutch naval commander, Lieutenant-Admiral of the United Provinces of the Netherlands and nobleman during the French Wars of Religion, the Anglo–Spanish War (1585–1604) and the Eighty Years' War.

Jacob was the son of Maria van Hoxwier and Gijsbert van Duvenvoorde, the lord of Obdam, Hensbroek, Spanbroek & Opmeer and member of the Compromise of Nobles. In 1604 he married Anna van Randerode van der Aa (c. 1580–1614), with whom he had four children while residing in The Hague. Their youngest child and only son was Jacob van Wassenaer Obdam, future supreme commander of the confederate Dutch navy. In 1615 he bought Zuidwijk from the prince of Ligne, a piece of land near Wassenaar and adopted the name "van Wassenaer". Besides his career as naval commander he was governor of Heusden.
