= Islands Voyage =

Part of the Anglo–Spanish War (1585–1604)

- Part of the Anglo-Spanish War (1585–1604) and the Eighty Years' War
Date	June – August 1597
Location	Plymouth, Atlantic Ocean, Bay of Biscay, Cantabrian Sea, Ferrol and Azores Islands
Result	Spanish victory

Belligerents
England; Dutch Republic	Spain; Portugal

Commanders and leaders
(Kingdom of England) Robert Devereux (Kingdom of England) Thomas Howard (Kingdom of England) Walter Raleigh (Dutch Republic) Jacob Duivenvoorde	(Spain) Martín de Padilla (Spain) Alonso de Bazán (Spain) Juan de Garibay

Strength
120–150 ships 17,000 to 20,000 men (6,000 soldiers)	Unknown

Casualties and losses
High	Low

The Islands Voyage, also known as the Essex-Raleigh Expedition, was an ambitious, but unsuccessful naval campaign sent by Queen Elizabeth I of England, and supported by the Dutch Republic, against the Spanish Empire and Portuguese Empire of Philip II from the House of Habsburg during the Anglo-Spanish War (1585–1604) and the Eighty Years' War.

== Campaign ==
The campaign took place between June and late August 1597, and the objectives were to destroy the Spanish fleet of the Adelantado of Castile, Martín de Padilla y Manrique, Count of Santa Gadea, at the port of Ferrol, occupy and destroy the Spanish possessions in the Azores Islands, and intercept the Spanish treasure fleet coming from America as it passed through the Azores. The result of the campaign was a great failure for England. It was led by Sir Robert Devereux, Earl of Essex, as Admiral and General-in-chief, Sir Thomas Howard, Earl of Suffolk, as Vice-Admiral, and Sir Walter Raleigh as Rear-Admiral. The Dutch squadron was commanded by Lieutenant-Admiral Jacob van Wassenaer Duivenvoorde. Other notable participants were Sir Henry Wriothesley, Earl of Southampton (who commanded the galleon Garland), the Baron Jacob Astley of Reading, Sir Edward Michelborne aboard the Moon, Sir Robert Mansell, Roger Manners 5th Earl of Rutland, and the English poet John Donne.

The Anglo-Dutch fleet returned to England with great losses and a war of recriminations between Essex and Raleigh. The Spanish fleets were led by Martín de Padilla, Alonso de Bazán, Diego Brochero and Pedro de Zubiaur. The treasure fleet was commanded by Admiral Juan Gutiérrez de Garibay.

The expedition was the last major naval campaign of Elizabeth I of England. Essex's failure to capture the silver of the Spanish treasure fleet, and his failure to occupy the Portuguese Azores Islands (Iberian Union), contributed to his decline in the queen's favour.

== See also ==
- Adelantado
- Master-General of the Ordnance
- Franco-Spanish War (1595–1598)
