= Pedro de Zubiaur =

Spanish naval officer (1540 -1605)

- Born: 1540; Ziortza-Bolibar, Biscay
- Died: 3 August 1605 (aged 64–65) Dover, England
- Buried: Bilbao, Spain
- Allegiance: Spain
- Branch: Spanish Navy
- Rank: General
- Conflicts: Anglo-Spanish War; Battle of Blaye (1591); Battle of the Bay of Biscay; Battle of Blaye (1593); Raid on Mount's Bay; Islands Voyage; 4th Spanish Armada; Battle of Castelhaven; Battle of the Channel

Pedro de Zubiaur, Zubiaurre or Çubiaurre (1540 – 3 August 1605) was a Spanish naval officer and engineer, general of the Spanish Navy, distinguished for his achievements in the Anglo-Spanish War (1585–1604).

== Biography ==
Born into a seafaring family from Biscay, Zubiaur started his naval career in 1568 plying between the ports of Bilbao and Flanders, where he worked under the command of the Grand Duke of Alba. After getting promoted to General for his naval achievements in the Low Countries, during the Brittany campaign he won several battles against the English for Philip II of Spain, the most famous of them during the relief of Blaye. He captured six English ships from Raleigh's fleet near cape Finisterre in 1597.

During the 4th Spanish Armada, this time sent to Ireland, Zubiaur made landfall at Castlehaven in December after being driven back by contrary winds. His small fleet was neutralised by an English fleet led by Richard Leveson. On his return to Spain, Zubiaur was later arrested for not sending troops to Kinsale.

In 1604, inspired by the works of engineer Peter Morice in London, he built an advanced waterwheel system for the irrigation in Valladolid, similar to the Artificio de Juanelo. He personally funded the 6,000 ducats of its construction, which were never repaid to him. Only after his death his widow received a third of the inversion.

After the war, in 1605, he was put in command of 18 ships charged with transporting troops to Dunkirk but on the way they met a Dutch fleet of 80 ships under admiral Hatwain. During the ensuing battle, Zubiaur was wounded and lost two ships and 400 men, but he managed to save the fleet and find shelter at Dover, under the protection of the English artillery, now allied to Spain. His injuries, however, were so serious that he died there some days later. His body was transported to Bilbao for burial.
