= Juan Gutiérrez de Garibay =

Spanish naval commander

Don Juan Gutiérrez de Garibay was a Spanish naval commander, Admiral of the Spanish navy, and commander-in-chief of the Spanish treasure fleet, during the Anglo–Spanish War (1585–1604), the Eighty Years' War, and the French Wars of Religion.
