= Battle of Castlehaven =

Battle between English and Irish forces in County Cork in 1601

- Part of the Nine Years' War and Anglo-Spanish War
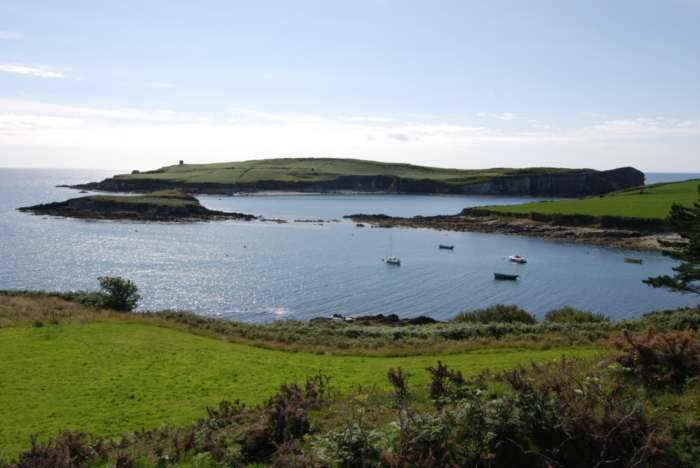
- Present-day view of Castle Haven
Date	6 December 1601
Location	Bay off Castlehaven, County Cork, Kingdom of Ireland 51.512375°N 9.176331°W
Result	English victory

Belligerents
England	Spain; Irish Alliance

Commanders and leaders
Richard Leveson	Pedro de Zubiaur

Strength
4 warships 2 merchantman	6 ships Numerous shore batteries

Casualties and losses
150 casualties	2 ships sunk, 4 driven ashore 200 killed or wounded, 50 captured

The Battle of Castlehaven was a naval battle that took place on 6 December 1601 in the bay off Castlehaven on the south coast of Ireland during the Nine Years' War during the 4th Spanish Armada between a Spanish naval convoy of six ships and an English fleet, commanded by Admiral Richard Leveson and consisting of four warships. The Spanish convoy was protected by fortified positions on shore, a castle, and 600 Spanish and Irish footmen. Five out of six Spanish ships, commanded by General Pedro de Zubiaur were either sunk, captured, or run aground in the battle, while the English fleet lost no ships.

== Background ==
On 23 September 1601, a Spanish Fleet under Don Juan del Águila arrived in Kinsale harbour. Zubiaur with six ships became separated from the main fleet. Eventually Zubiar arrived with a total force of 2000 men near Castlehaven on 1 December. At that time Castlehaven Castle was held by the O'Driscoll clan and they welcomed the Spanish. On 2 December, a day after the Spanish arrived in Castlehaven, Lord Mountjoy was informed that six Spanish ships had entered the harbour of Castlehaven. On 4 December, Mountjoy received confirmation of the story. The danger posed by the Spaniards’ arrival was immediately realized, and Mountjoy took immediate steps to strengthen English defences. The commander of the English naval forces at Kinsale, Admiral Leveson, was ordered to "seeke the Spanish fleete at Castlehaven, to take them if he could, or otherwise to distresse them as much as he might." Leveson then left his vice-admiral Preston to guard Kinsale harbour and took the rest of the fleet heavily armed to Castlehaven.

== Battle ==
Leveson had with him four naval vessels, Warspite, Defiance, Swiftsure, and Merlin, as well as a merchantman and a caravel. The following day, the wind was blowing inland, thereby preventing the English ships from leaving. Leveson had his vessels towed out of Kinsale harbour, and he then set off for Castlehaven.

At 10 o’clock the next morning, 6 December, Leveson’s fleet arrived off Castlehaven. Zubiaur however was ready for them with an eight-gun battery at the mouth of the harbour. A Captain Fleming commanding the 10-gun Merlin rowed through Spanish fire to make a channel for the 518-ton Warspite to follow. A heavy pounding from the Spanish shore batteries and the vessels ensued which Leveson said ‘much annoyed’ him. From then until four o’clock that afternoon the two sides battled. Zubiaur's flagship galleon Maria Francesca was sunk with most hands. Another 200-ton vessel Cisno Camello was holed below the waterline and soon began to sink, and settled in shallow water. A French hire ship used for supplies was according to Leveson reduced to matchwood. Two more Spanish vessels were pounded until their crews forced them onto the rocks after sustaining continuous fire particularly from the big galleons Defiance and Warspite. Finally a Spanish merchant was boarded and captured and was found to have wheat and biscuits before being abandoned and it too being driven aground.

The Spanish were now being reinforced by more Irish foot men. Leveson's ships were running low on ammunition as they were continually returning fire. With all but one of the Spanish vessels neutralized, and with the wind blowing onshore, Leveson managed to withdraw his ships, being towed out under fire from the remaining shore batteries. (Note: "Leveson's fleet drove away and later destroyed Aguila's supply fleet", Arnold-Baker, p 479)

== Aftermath ==
The english fleet had suffered moderate damage. (Note: "Warspite alone had suffered twelve killed and forty wounded out of a total of 150 casualties but no ships were lost." McGurk p 208) Most of the time Leveson had to tow his ships to Kinsale as the wind never seemed to be in his favour. After returning, Warpsite was found to have nearly 209 cannonballs struck according to the ship's surgeon William Farmer.

Leveson had achieved a victory, neutralising Zubiaur’s naval potential. He would assist in Mountjoy's siege of Kinsale. He closed off the bay and blockaded it from the sea which was crucial to the English victory there. (Note: "the navy rendered essential services to the English victory. Some strategists argue that without Leveson’s ships Kinsale would almost certainly have been an Irish-Spanish victory which would have altered the whole course of European history. Ireland, and even England itself, might have become provinces of the Spanish empire", Silke pg 136. See also http://www.historyireland.com/volumes/volume9/issue3/features/?id=249) The Spanish garrison at Castlehaven was now cut off but distributed themselves around the area at Baltimore (Donneshed Castle), but these soon surrendered when news of the defeat at Kinsale came through. Pedro De Zubiaur made his way back to Spain and was arrested for his responsibilities but later released.

== See also ==
- Anglo-Spanish War (1585–1604)
- Nine Years' War (Ireland)
- Siege of Kinsale

== Bibliography ==
- Arnold-Baker, Charles (2001). The companion to British history. Informa Healthcare. ISBN 978-0-415-18583-7.
- Childs, David (2014). Pirate Nation: Elizabeth I and her Royal Sea Rovers. Seaforth. ISBN 978-1-84832-294-3.
- Colm, Lennon (1995). Sixteenth Century Ireland — The Incomplete Conquest. Dublin: Gill & Macmillan Ltd. ISBN 0-312-12462-7.
- Ekin, Des (2014). The Last Armada: Siege of 100 Days: Kinsale 1601. O'Brien Press. ISBN 978-1-84717-699-8.
- McGurk, John (2009). The Elizabethan Conquest of Ireland: The 1590s Crisis. Manchester University Press. ISBN 978-0-7190-8051-7.
- Silke, John J (2000). Kinsale: the Spanish intervention in Ireland at the end of the Elizabethan war. Liverpool University Press. ISBN 978-1-85182-551-6.
- Stafford, Thomas (1896). A history of the wars in Ireland, during the reign of Queen Elizabeth Vol. II. Downy. ISBN 1-170-31027-3.
- Graham, Winston (2013). The Spanish Armadas. Pan Macmillan. ISBN 978-1-4472-5684-7.
