= History of England =

The territory today known as England became inhabited more than 800,000 years ago, as the discovery of stone tools and footprints at Happisburgh in Norfolk have indicated. The earliest evidence for early modern humans in Northwestern Europe, a jawbone discovered in Devon at Kents Cavern in 1927, was re-dated in 2011 to between 41,000 and 44,000 years old. Continuous human habitation in England dates to around 13,000 years ago (see Creswellian), at the end of the Last Glacial Period. The region has numerous remains from the Mesolithic, Neolithic and Bronze Age, such as Stonehenge and Avebury. In the Iron Age, all of Britain south of the Firth of Forth was inhabited by the Celtic people known as the Britons, including some Belgic tribes (e.g. the Atrebates, the Catuvellauni, the Trinovantes, etc.) in the south east. In AD 43 the Roman conquest of Britain began; the Romans maintained control of their province of Britannia until the early 5th century.

The end of Roman rule in Britain facilitated the Anglo-Saxon settlement of Britain, which historians often regard as the origin of England and of the English people. The Anglo-Saxons, a collection of various Germanic peoples, established several kingdoms that became the primary powers in present-day England and parts of southern Scotland. They introduced the Old English language, which largely displaced the previous Brittonic language. The Anglo-Saxons warred with British successor states in western Britain and the Hen Ogledd (Old North; the Brittonic-speaking parts of northern Britain), as well as with each other. Raids by Vikings became frequent after about AD 800, and the Norsemen settled in large parts of what is now England. During this period, several rulers attempted to unite the various Anglo-Saxon kingdoms, an effort that led to the emergence of the Kingdom of England by the 10th century.

In 1066, a Norman expedition invaded and conquered England. The Norman dynasty, established by William the Conqueror, ruled England for over half a century before the period of succession crisis known as the Anarchy (1135–1154). Following the Anarchy, England came under the rule of the House of Plantagenet, a dynasty which later inherited claims to the Kingdom of France. During this period, Magna Carta was signed and Parliament became established. Anti-Semitism rose to great heights, and in 1290, England became the first country to permanently expel the Jews. A succession crisis in France led to the Hundred Years' War (1337–1453), a series of conflicts involving the peoples of both nations. Following the Hundred Years' Wars, England became embroiled in its own succession wars between the descendants of Edward III's five sons. The Wars of the Roses broke out in 1455 and pitted the descendants of the second son (through a female line) Lionel of Antwerp known as the House of York against the House of Lancaster who descended from the third son John of Gaunt and his son Henry IV, the latter of whom had overthrown his cousin Richard II (the only surviving son of Edward III's eldest son Edward the Black Prince) in 1399. In 1485, the war ended when Lancastrian Henry Tudor emerged victorious from the Battle of Bosworth Field and married the senior female Yorkist descendant, Elizabeth of York, uniting the two houses.

Under the Tudors and the later Stuart dynasty, England became a colonial power. During the rule of the Stuarts, the English Civil War took place between the Parliamentarians and the Royalists, which resulted in the execution of King Charles I (1649) and the establishment of a series of republican governments—first, a Parliamentary republic known as the Commonwealth of England (1649–1653), then a military dictatorship under Oliver Cromwell known as the Protectorate (1653–1659). The Stuarts returned to the restored throne in 1660, though continued questions over religion and power resulted in the deposition of another Stuart king, James II, in the Glorious Revolution (1688). England, which had subsumed Wales in the 16th century under Henry VIII, united with Scotland in 1707 to form a new sovereign state called Great Britain. Following the Industrial Revolution, which started in England, Great Britain ruled a colonial Empire, the largest in recorded history. Following a process of decolonisation in the 20th century, mainly caused by the weakening of Great Britain's power in the two World Wars, almost all of the empire's overseas territories became independent countries. Today, England remains a part of the United Kingdom, a constitutional monarchy, and elects 543 members to the Parliament of the United Kingdom.

== Prehistory ==
=== Stone Age ===
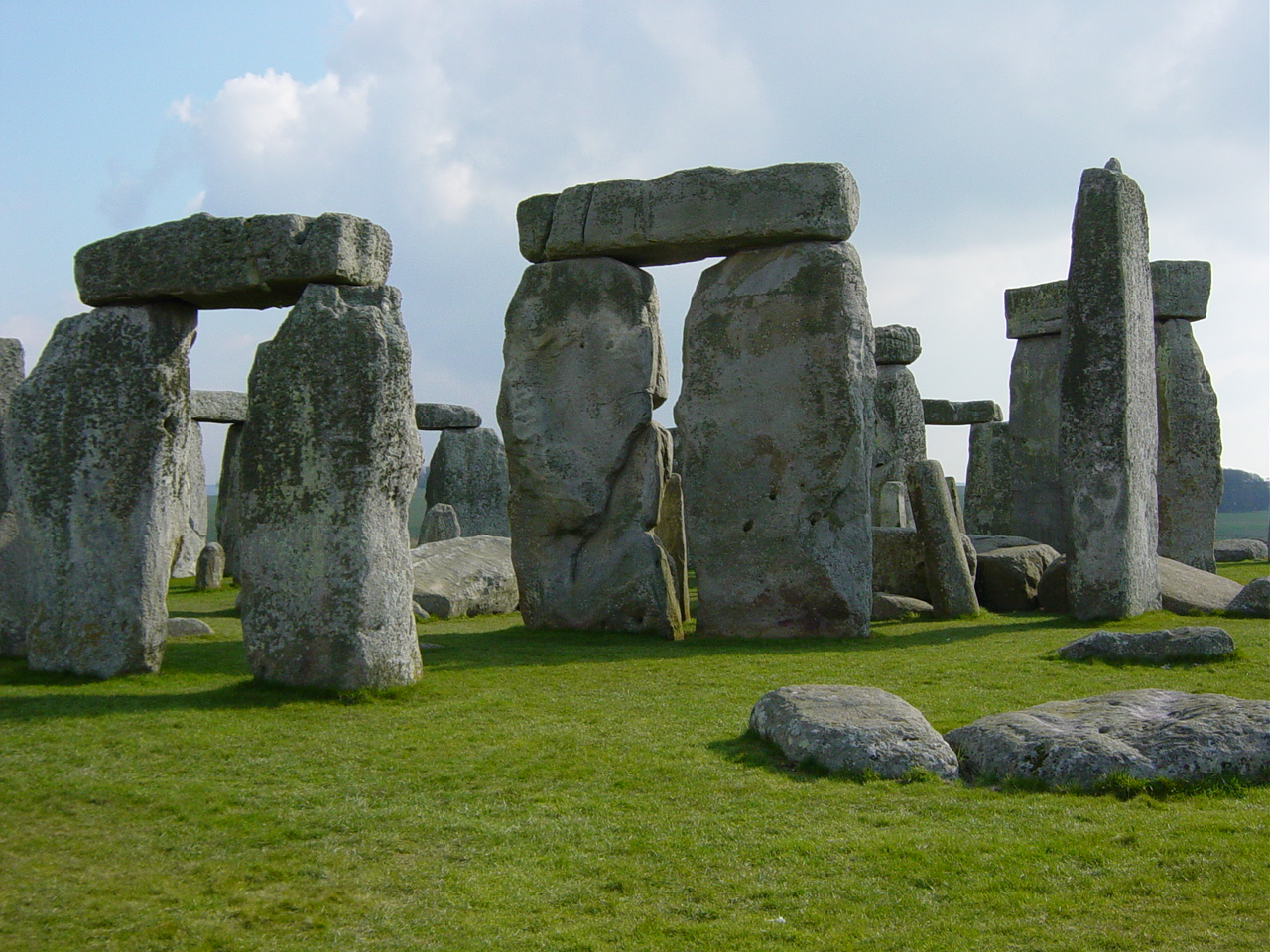
Stonehenge, erected in several stages from c.3000–2500 BC

The time from Britain's first inhabitation until the Last Glacial Maximum is known as the Old Stone Age, or Paleolithic era. Archaeological evidence indicates that what was to become England was colonised by humans long before the rest of the British Isles because of its more hospitable climate between and during the various glacial periods of the distant past. This earliest evidence, from Happisburgh in Norfolk, includes the oldest hominid artefacts found in Britain, and points to dates of more than 800,000 RCYBP. These earliest inhabitants were hunter-gatherers. Low sea-levels meant that Britain was attached to the continent for much of this earliest period of history, and varying temperatures over tens of thousands of years meant that it was not always inhabited.

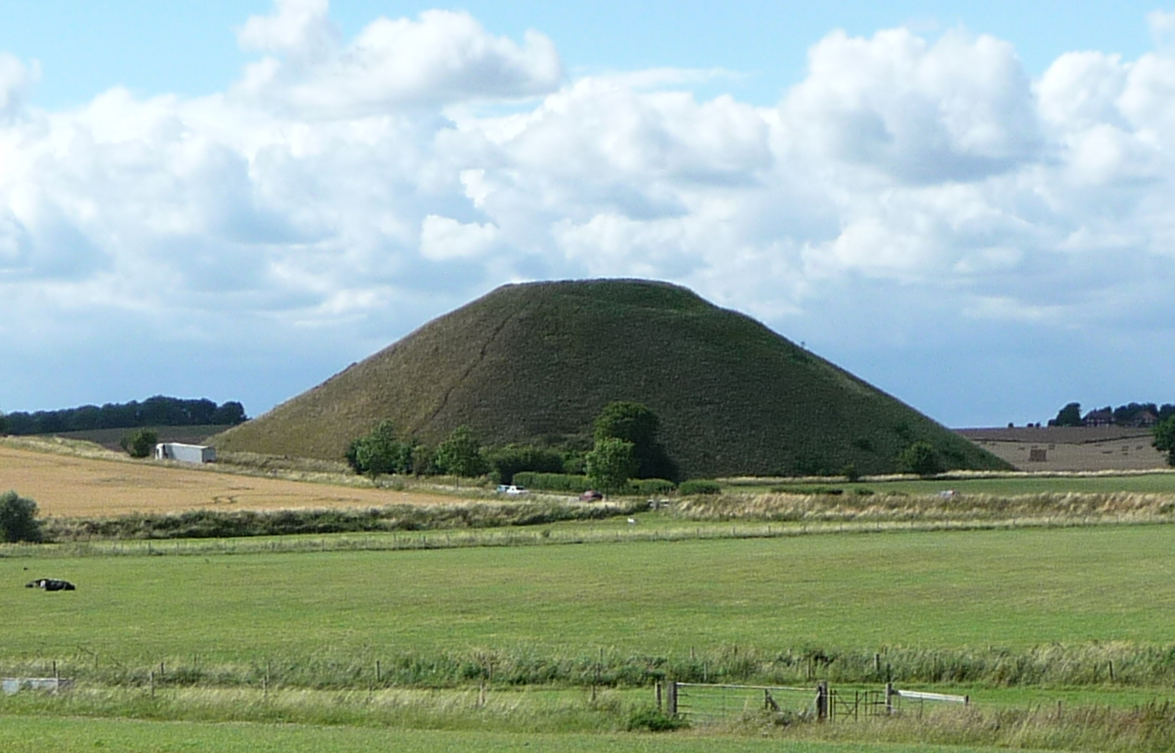
Silbury Hill, c. 2400 BC

England has been continuously inhabited since the last Ice Age ended around 9000 BC, the beginning of the Middle Stone Age, or Mesolithic era. Rising sea-levels cut off Britain from the continent for the last time around 6500 BC. The population by then, as in the rest of the world, was exclusively anatomically modern humans, and the evidence suggests that their societies were increasingly complex and they were manipulating their environment and prey in new ways, possibly selective burning of then-omnipresent woodland to create clearings for herds to gather and hunt. Hunting was mainly done with simple projectile weapons such as the javelin and possibly the sling. The bow and arrow was known in Western Europe since at least 9000 BC. The climate continued to warm and the population probably rose.

The New Stone Age, or Neolithic era, began with the introduction of farming, ultimately from the Middle East, around 4000 BC. A 2019 study found that the Neolithic farmers of the British Isles had entered the region through a mass migration c. 4100 BC. They were closely related to Neolithic peoples of Iberia. People began to lead a more settled lifestyle. Monumental collective tombs were built for the dead in the form of chambered cairns and long barrows. Towards the end of this period, other kinds of monumental stone alignments begin to appear, such as Stonehenge; their cosmic alignments show a preoccupation with the sky and planets. Flint technology produced a number of highly artistic pieces as well as purely practical. More extensive woodland clearance was done for fields and pastures. The Sweet Track in the Somerset Levels is one of the oldest timber trackways known in Northern Europe and among the oldest roads in the world, dated by dendrochronology to the winter of 3807–3806 BC; it is thought to have been a primarily religious structure. Archaeological evidence from North Yorkshire indicates that salt was being manufactured there in the Neolithic.

=== Later Prehistory ===
==== Bronze Age ====
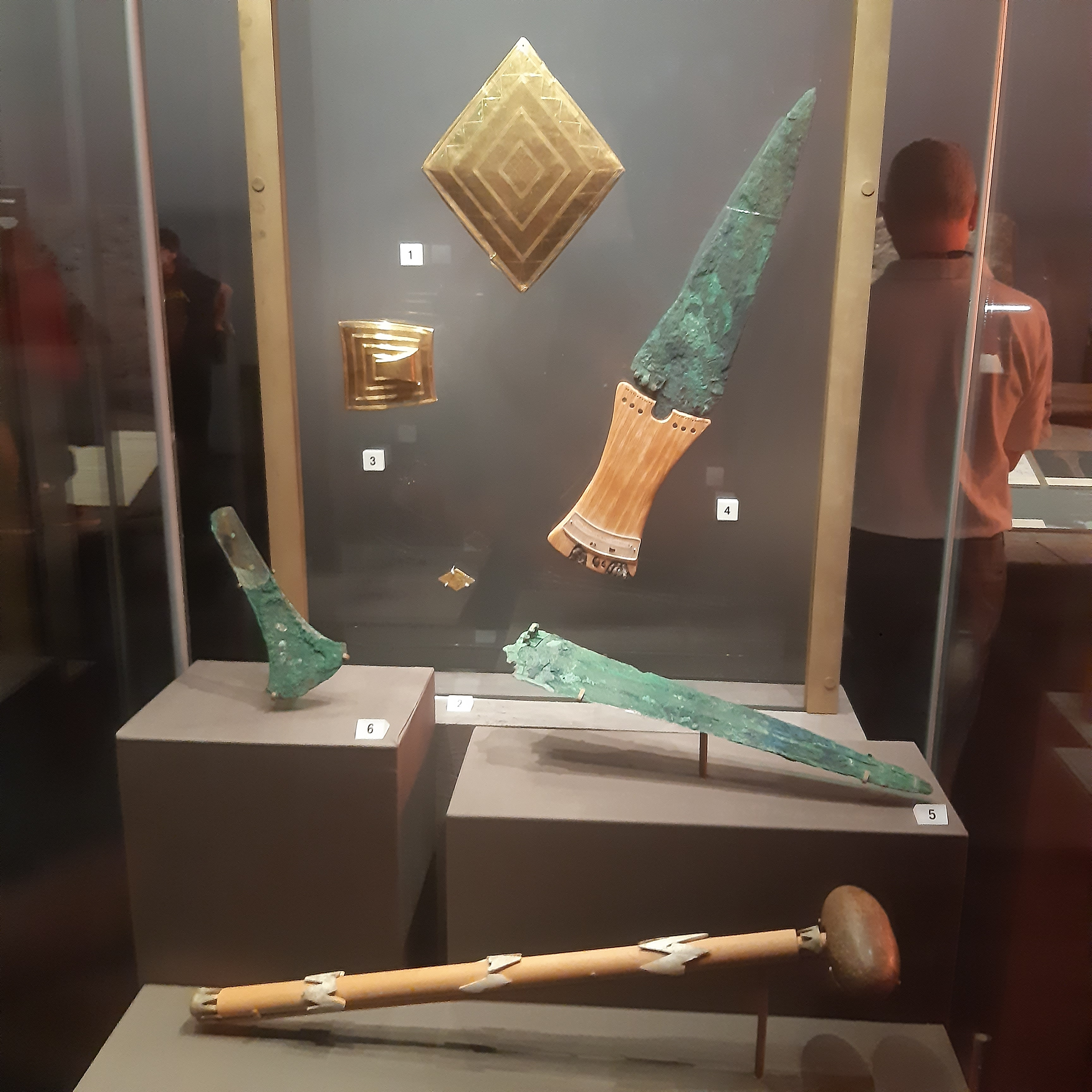
Artefacts from Bush Barrow at Stonehenge. Wessex culture, Early Bronze Age, c. 1900 BC

The Bronze Age began around 2500 BC with the appearance of bronze objects. This coincides with the appearance of the characteristic Bell Beaker culture, following migration of new people from the continent. According to Olalde et al. (2018), after 2500 BC Britain's Neolithic population was largely replaced by this new Bell Beaker population, that was genetically related to the Corded Ware culture of central and eastern Europe and the Yamnaya culture of the eastern European Pontic-Caspian Steppe. While the migration of these Beaker peoples must have been accompanied by a language shift, the Celtic languages were probably introduced by later Celtic migrations.

The Bronze Age saw a shift of emphasis from the communal to the individual, and the rise of increasingly powerful elites whose power came from their prowess as hunters and warriors and their controlling the flow of precious resources to manipulate tin and copper into high-status bronze objects such as swords and axes. Settlement became increasingly permanent and intensive. Towards the end of the Bronze Age, many examples of very fine metalwork began to be deposited in rivers, presumably for ritual reasons and perhaps reflecting a progressive change in emphasis from the sky to the earth, as a rising population put increasing pressure on the land. England largely became bound up with the Atlantic trade system, which created a cultural continuum over a large part of Western Europe. It is possible that the Celtic languages developed or spread to England as part of this system; by the end of the Iron Age there is much evidence that they were spoken across all England and western parts of Britain.

==== Iron Age ====
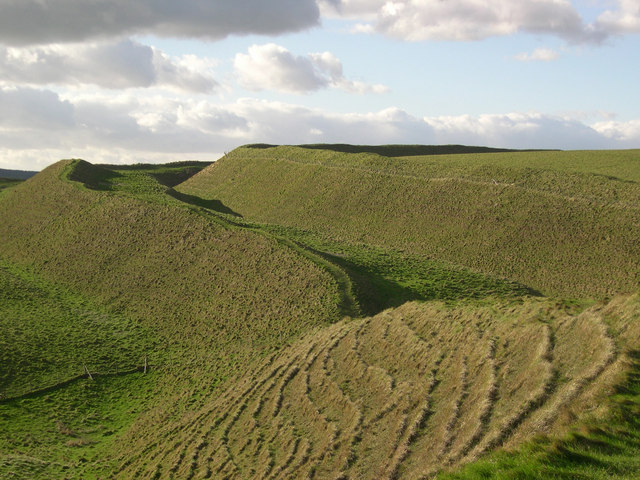
View of the ramparts of the hillfort of Maiden Castle (450 BC), as they look today

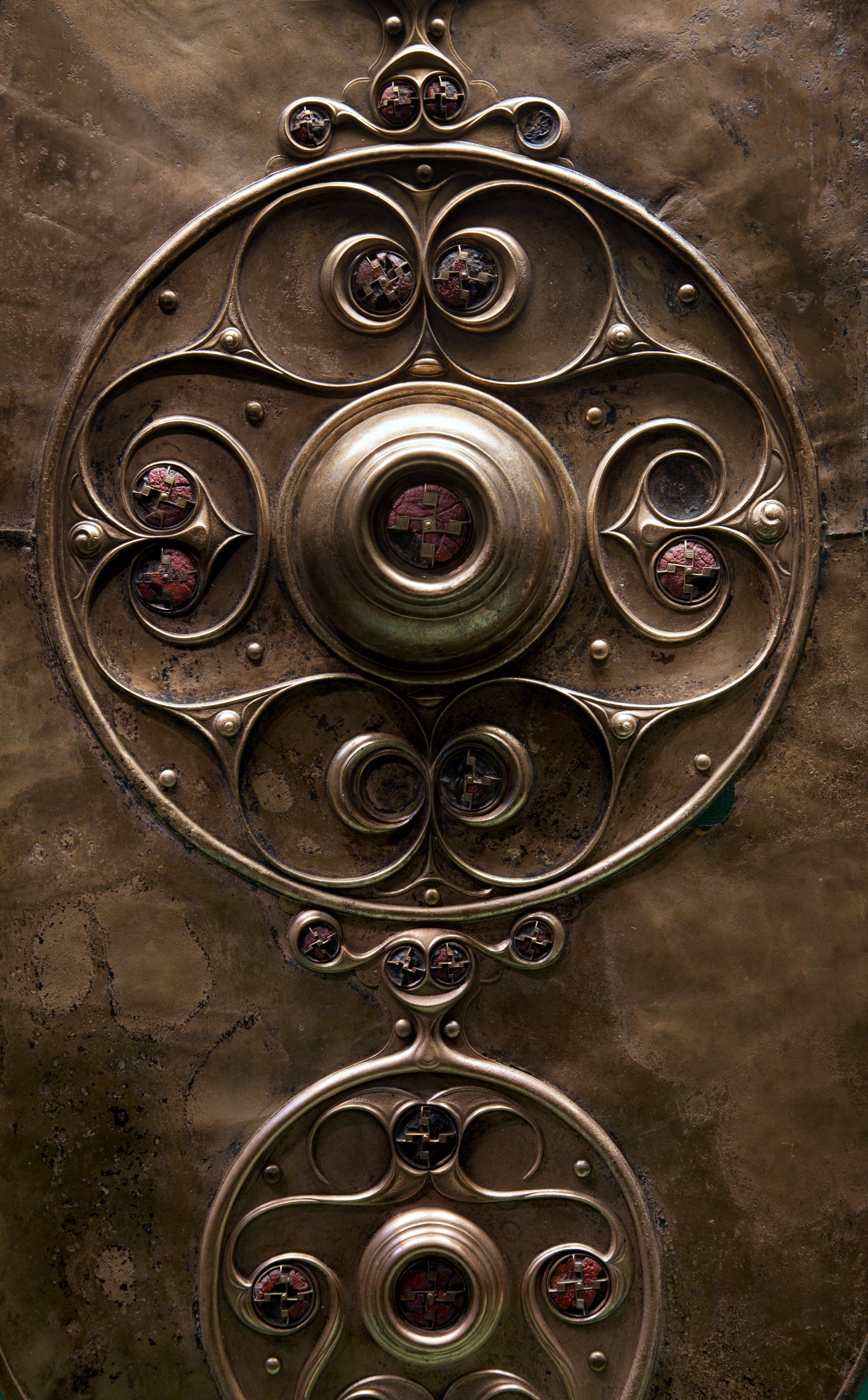
The Battersea Shield (detail), 350 BC.

The Iron Age is conventionally said to begin around 800 BC. At this time, the Britons or Celtic Britons were settled in England. The Celtic people of early England were the majority of the population, beside other smaller ethnic groups in Great Britain. After some time, the Celtic Britons diverged into the multiple distinct ethnic groups such as Welsh, Cornish and Breton, but they were still tied by language, religion and culture. They spoke the Brittonic language, a Celtic language which is the ancestor of the modern Brittonic languages. The Atlantic trade system had by this time effectively collapsed, although England maintained contacts across the channel with France, as the Hallstatt culture became widespread across the country. Its continuity suggests it was not accompanied by substantial movement of population; crucially, only a single Hallstatt burial is known from Britain, and even here the evidence is inconclusive. On the whole, burials largely disappear across England, and the dead were disposed of in a way which is archaeologically invisible: excarnation is a widely cited possibility. Hillforts were known since the Late Bronze Age, but a huge number were constructed during 600–400 BC, particularly in the South, while after about 400 BC new forts were rarely built and many ceased to be regularly inhabited, while a few forts become more and more intensively occupied, suggesting a degree of regional centralisation.

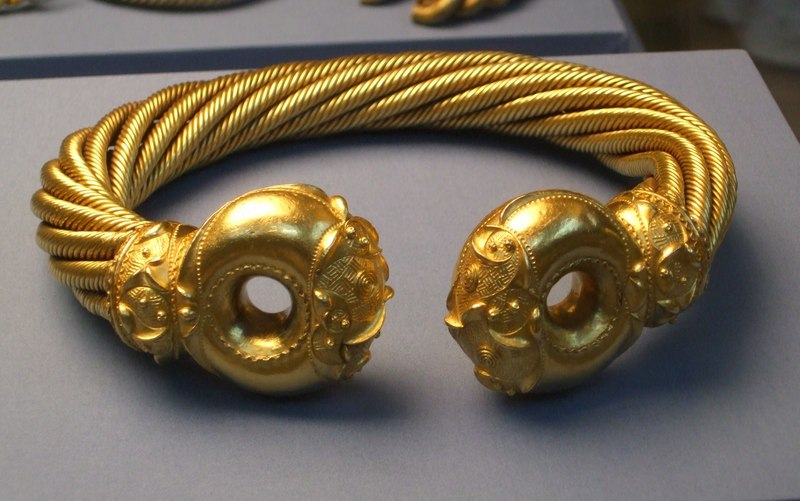
Gold torc from Snettisham, 70 BC

Around this time the earliest mentions of Britain appear in the annals of history. The first historical mention of the region is from the Massaliote Periplus, a sailing manual for merchants thought to date to the 6th century BC, and Pytheas of Massilia wrote of his voyage of discovery to the island around 325 BC. Both of these texts are now lost; although quoted by later writers, not enough survives to inform the archaeological interpretation to any significant degree.

Britain, we are told, is inhabited by tribes which are autochthonous and preserve in their ways of living the ancient manner of life. They use chariots, for instance, in their wars, even as tradition tells us the old Greek heroes did in the Trojan War.

— Diodorus Siculus, Bibliotheca historica, 60–30 BC.

Contact with the continent was less than in the Bronze Age but still significant. Goods continued to move to England, with a possible hiatus around 350 to 150 BC. There were a few armed invasions of hordes of migrating Celts. There are two known invasions. Around 300 BC, a group from the Gaulish Parisii tribe apparently took over East Yorkshire, establishing the highly distinctive Arras culture. And from around 150–100 BC, groups of Belgae began to control significant parts of the South.

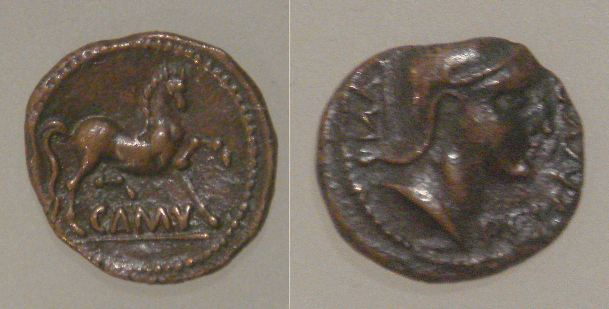
Bronze coins of Cunobelin, called "King of the Britons" by Suetonius. 1–42 AD.

These invasions constituted movements of a few people who established themselves as a warrior elite atop existing native systems, rather than replacing them. The Belgic invasion was much larger than the Parisian settlement, but the continuity of pottery style shows that the native population remained in place. Yet, it was accompanied by significant socio-economic change. Proto-urban, or even urban settlements, known as oppida, begin to eclipse the old hillforts, and an elite whose position is based on battle prowess and the ability to manipulate resources re-appears much more distinctly.

In 55 and 54 BC, Julius Caesar, as part of his campaigns in Gaul, invaded Britain and claimed to have scored a number of victories, but he never penetrated further than Hertfordshire and could not establish a province. However, his invasions mark a turning-point in British history. Control of trade, the flow of resources and prestige goods, became ever more important to the elites of Southern Britain; Rome steadily became the biggest player in all their dealings, as the provider of great wealth and patronage. In retrospect, a full-scale invasion and annexation was inevitable.

== Roman Britain ==
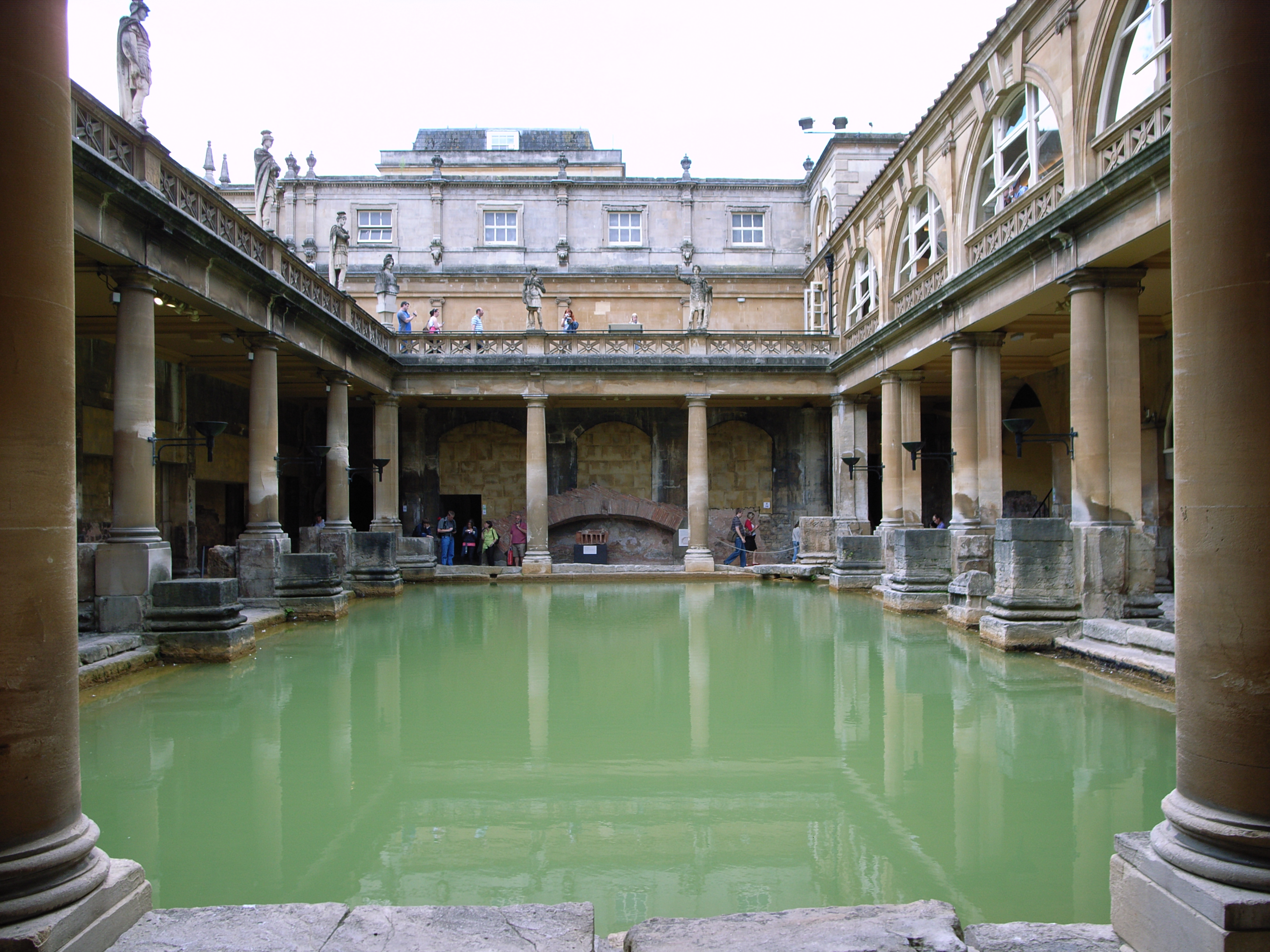
Remains of the Roman baths at Bath, England.

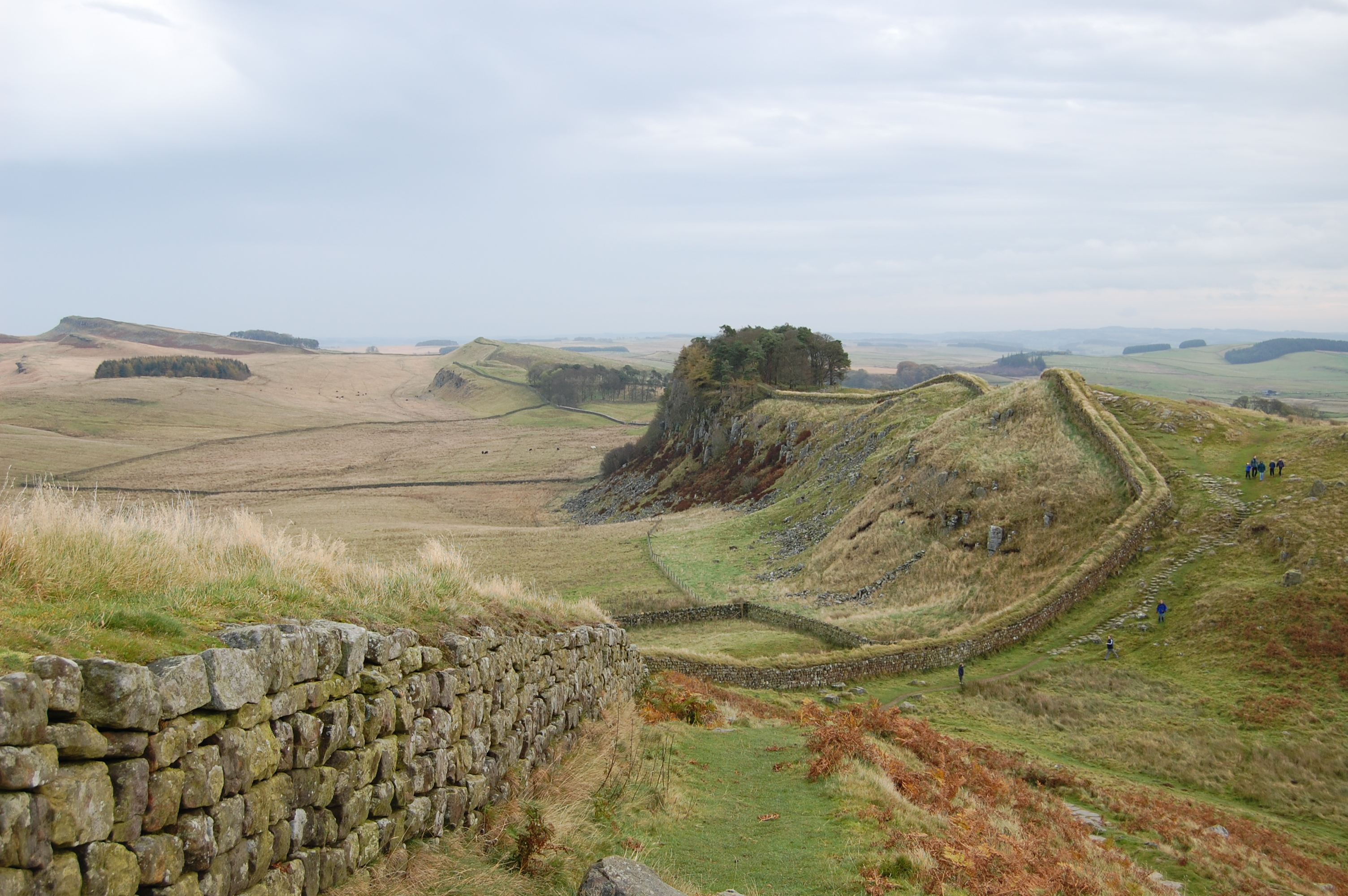
Remains of Hadrian's Wall

After Caesar's expeditions, the Romans began a serious and sustained attempt to conquer Britain in AD 43, at the behest of Emperor Claudius. They landed in Kent with four legions and defeated two armies led by the kings of the Catuvellauni tribe, Caratacus and Togodumnus, in battles at the Medway and the Thames. Togodumnus was killed, and Caratacus fled to Wales. The Roman force, led by Aulus Plautius, waited for Claudius to come and lead the final march on the Catuvellauni capital at Camulodunum (modern Colchester), before he returned to Rome for his triumph. The Catuvellauni held sway over most of the southeastern corner of England; eleven local rulers surrendered, a number of client kingdoms were established, and the rest became a Roman province with Camulodunum as its capital. Over the next four years, the territory was consolidated and the future emperor Vespasian led a campaign into the Southwest where he subjugated two more tribes. By AD 54 the border had been pushed back to the Severn and the Trent, and campaigns were underway to subjugate Northern England and Wales.

But in AD 60, under the leadership of the warrior-queen Boudicca, the tribes rebelled against the Romans. At first, the rebels had great success. They burned Camulodunum, Londinium and Verulamium (modern-day Colchester, London and St. Albans respectively) to the ground. There is some archaeological evidence that the same happened at Winchester. The Second Legion Augusta, stationed at Exeter, refused to move for fear of revolt among the locals. Londinium governor Suetonius Paulinus evacuated the city before the rebels sacked and burned it; the fire was so hot that a ten-inch layer of melted red clay remains 15 feet below London's streets. In the end, the rebels were said to have killed 70,000 Romans and Roman sympathisers. Paulinus gathered what was left of the Roman army. In the decisive battle, 10,000 Romans faced nearly 100,000 warriors somewhere along the line of Watling Street, at the end of which Boudicca was utterly defeated. It was said that 80,000 rebels were killed, but only 400 Romans.

Over the next 20 years, the borders expanded slightly, but the governor Agricola incorporated into the province the last pockets of independence in Wales and Northern England. He also led a campaign into Scotland which was recalled by Emperor Domitian. The border gradually formed along the Stanegate road in Northern England, solidified by Hadrian's Wall built in AD 138, despite temporary forays into Scotland.

The Romans and their culture stayed in charge for 350 years. Traces of their presence are ubiquitous throughout England.

== Anglo-Saxon period ==
=== Anglo-Saxon migrations ===
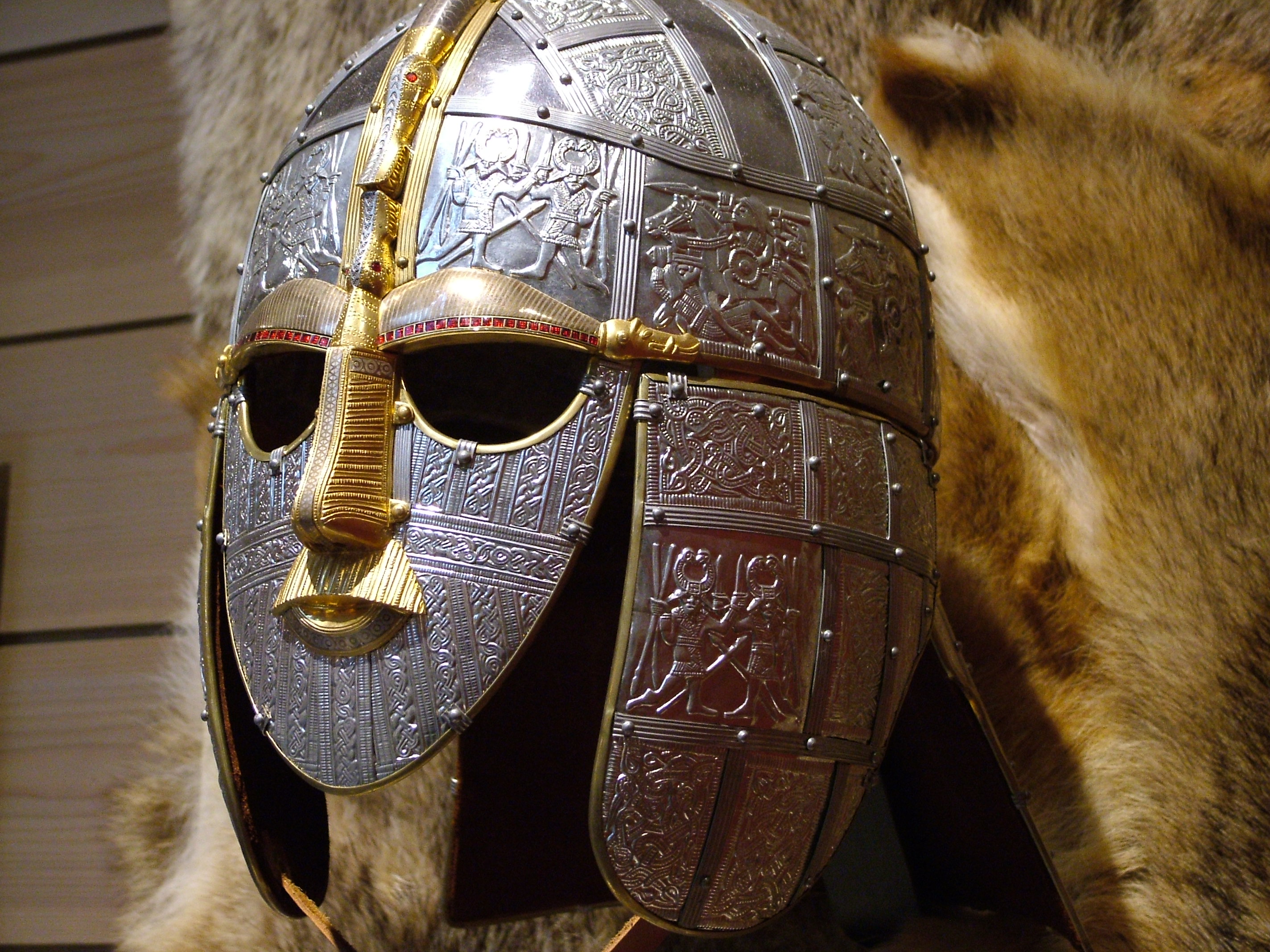
Anglo-Saxon helmet from the Sutton Hoo ship burial, 625 AD (replica)

In the wake of the breakdown of Roman rule in Britain from the middle of the fourth century, present day England was progressively settled by Germanic groups. Collectively known as the Anglo-Saxons, these included Angles, Saxons, Jutes, and Frisians. The Battle of Deorham was critical in establishing Anglo-Saxon rule in 577. Saxon mercenaries existed in Britain since before the late Roman period, but the main influx of population probably happened after the fifth century. The precise nature of these invasions is not fully known; there are doubts about the legitimacy of historical accounts due to a lack of archaeological finds. Gildas' De Excidio et Conquestu Britanniae, composed in the 6th century, states that when the Roman army departed the Isle of Britannia in the 4th century AD, the indigenous Britons were invaded by Picts, their neighbours to the north (now Scotland) and the Scots (now Ireland). Britons invited the Saxons to the island to repel them but after they vanquished the Scots and Picts, the Saxons turned against the Britons.

Kingdoms and tribes in Britain, c. AD 600

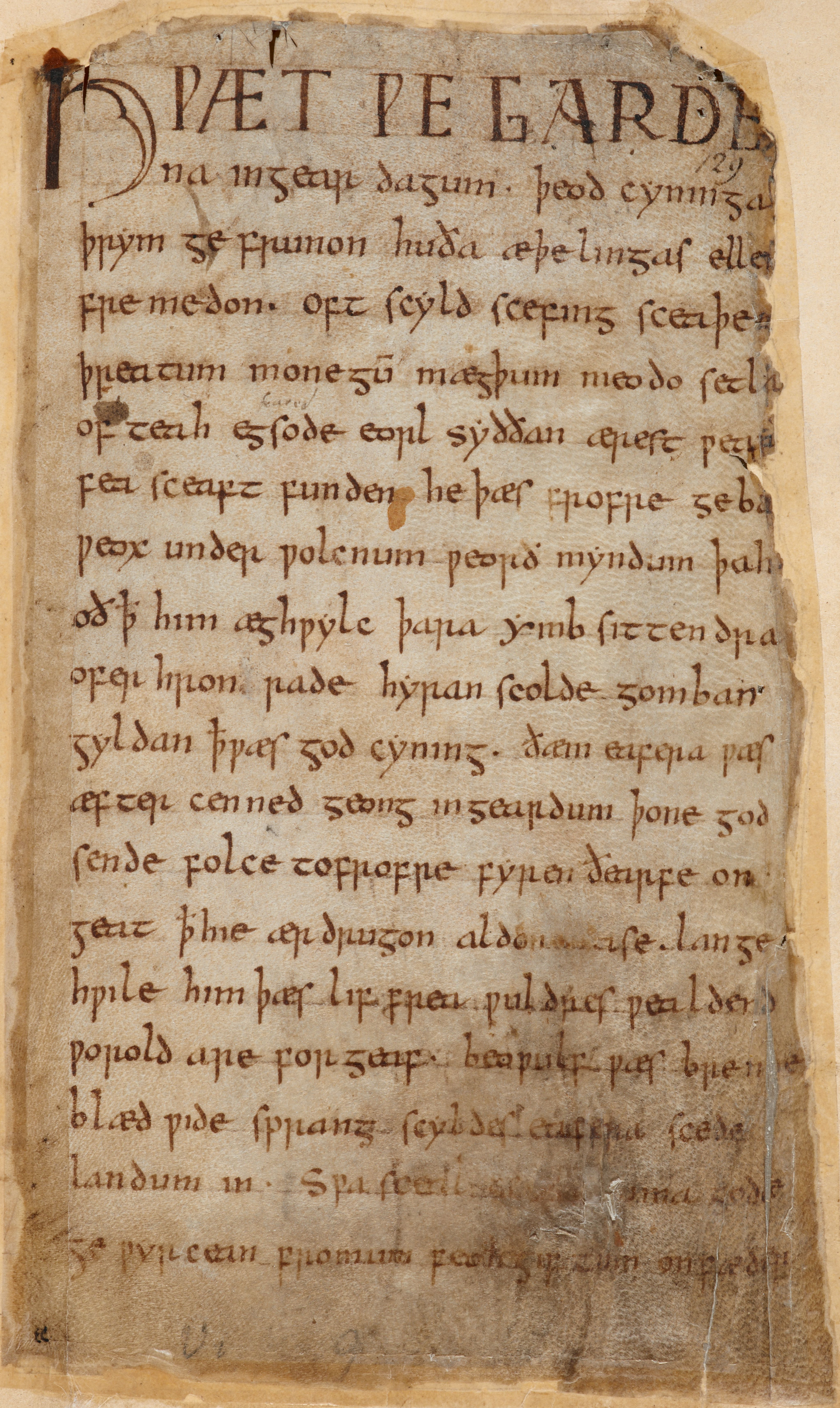
The epic poem Beowulf, set in 6th century Scandinavia, composed c. 700–1000 AD.

Seven kingdoms are traditionally identified as being established by these migrants. Three were clustered in the South east: Sussex, Kent and Essex. The Midlands were dominated by the kingdoms of Mercia and East Anglia. To the north was Northumbria which unified two earlier kingdoms, Bernicia and Deira. Other smaller kingdoms seem to have existed as well, such as Lindsey in what is now Lincolnshire, and the Hwicce in the southwest. Eventually, the kingdoms were dominated by Northumbria and Mercia in the 7th century, Mercia in the 8th century and then Wessex in the 9th century. Northumbria eventually extended its control north into Scotland and west into Wales. It also subdued Mercia whose first powerful King, Penda, was killed by Oswy in 655. Northumbria's power began to wane after 685 with the defeat and death of its king Aegfrith at the hands of the Picts. Mercian power reached its peak under the rule of Offa, who from 785 had influence over most of Anglo-Saxon England. Since Offa's death in 796, the supremacy of Wessex was established under Egbert who extended control west into Cornwall before defeating the Mercians at the Battle of Ellendun in 825. Four years later, he received submission and tribute from the Northumbrian king, Eanred.

Since so few contemporary sources exist, the events of the fifth and sixth centuries are difficult to ascertain. As such, the nature of the Anglo-Saxon settlements is debated by historians, archaeologists and linguists. The traditional view, that the Anglo-Saxons drove the Romano-British inhabitants out of what is now England, was subject to reappraisal in the later twentieth century. One suggestion is that the invaders were smaller in number, drawn from an elite class of male warriors that gradually acculturated the natives.

An emerging view is that the scale of the Anglo-Saxon settlement varied across England, and that as such it cannot be described by any one process in particular. Mass migration and population shift seem to be most applicable in the core areas of settlement such as East Anglia and Lincolnshire, while in more peripheral areas to the northwest, much of the native population likely remained in place as the incomers took over as elites. In a study of place names in northeastern England and southern Scotland, Bethany Fox concluded that Anglian migrants settled in large numbers in river valleys, such as those of the Tyne and the Tweed, with the Britons in the less fertile hill country becoming acculturated over a longer period. Fox interprets the process by which English came to dominate this region as "a synthesis of mass-migration and elite-takeover models."

=== Genetic markers of Anglo-Saxon migrations ===
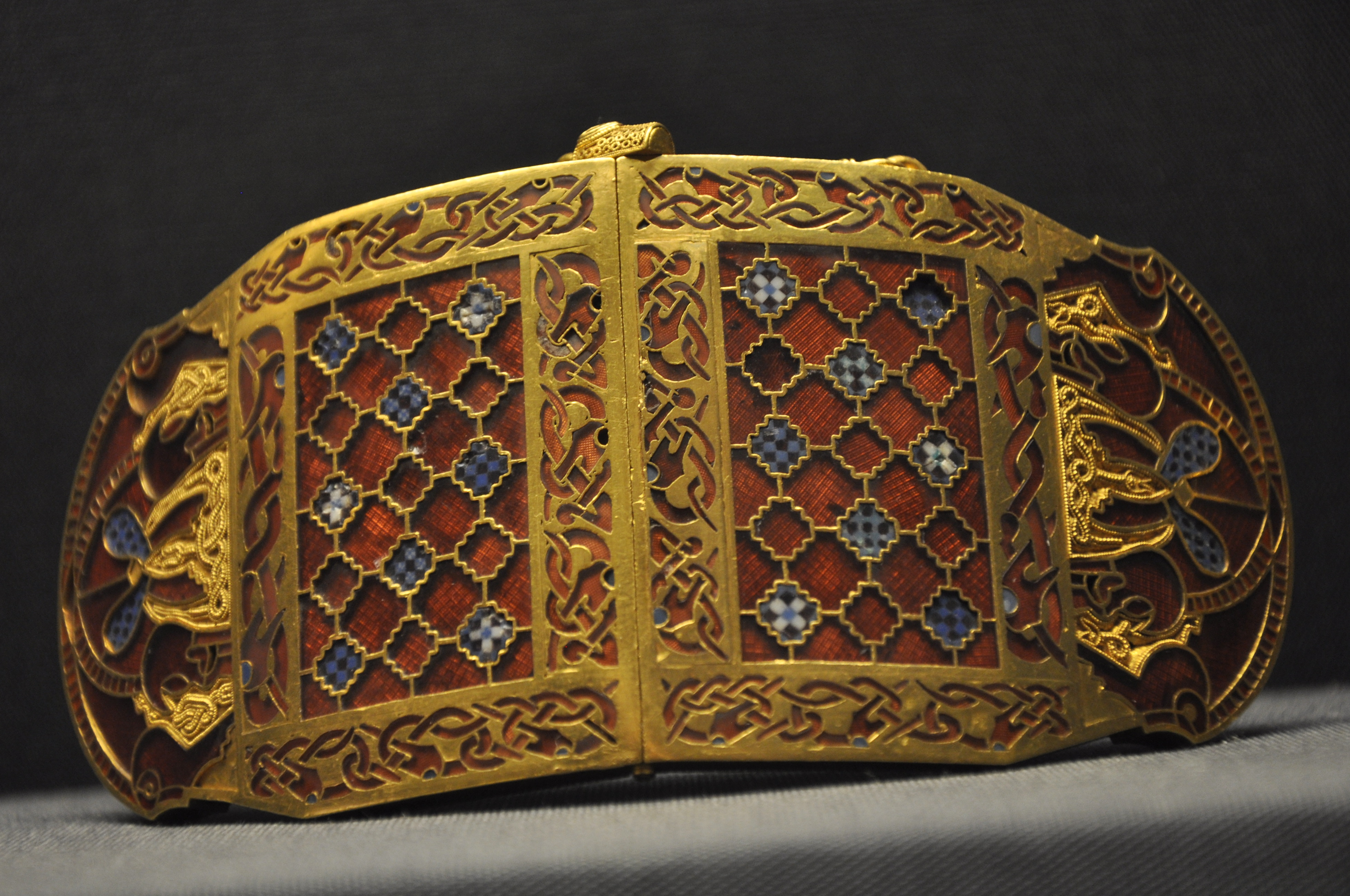
Shoulder clasp from Sutton Hoo, 625 AD

Genetic testing has been used to find evidence of large scale immigration of Germanic peoples into England. Weale et al. (2002) found that English Y DNA data showed signs of a mass Anglo-Saxon immigration from the European continent, affecting 50%–100% of the male gene pool in central England. This was based on the similarity of the DNA collected from small English towns to that found in Friesland. A 2003 study with samples coming from larger towns, found a large variance in amounts of continental "Germanic" ancestry in different parts of England. In the study, such markers typically ranged from 20% and 45% in southern England, with East Anglia, the east Midlands, and Yorkshire having over 50%. North German and Danish genetic frequencies were indistinguishable, thus precluding any ability to distinguish between the genetic influence of the Anglo-Saxon source populations and the later, and better documented, influx of Danish Vikings. The mean value of continental Germanic genetic input in this study was calculated at 54 per cent.

In response to arguments, such as those of Stephen Oppenheimer and Bryan Sykes, that the similarity between English and continental Germanic DNA could have originated from earlier prehistoric migrations, researchers have begun to use data collected from ancient burials to ascertain the level of Anglo-Saxon contribution to the modern English gene pool.

Two studies published in 2016, based on data collected from skeletons found in Iron Age, Roman and Anglo-Saxon era graves in Cambridgeshire and Yorkshire, concluded that the ancestry of the modern English population contains large contributions from both Anglo-Saxon migrants and Romano-British natives.

=== Heptarchy and Christianisation ===
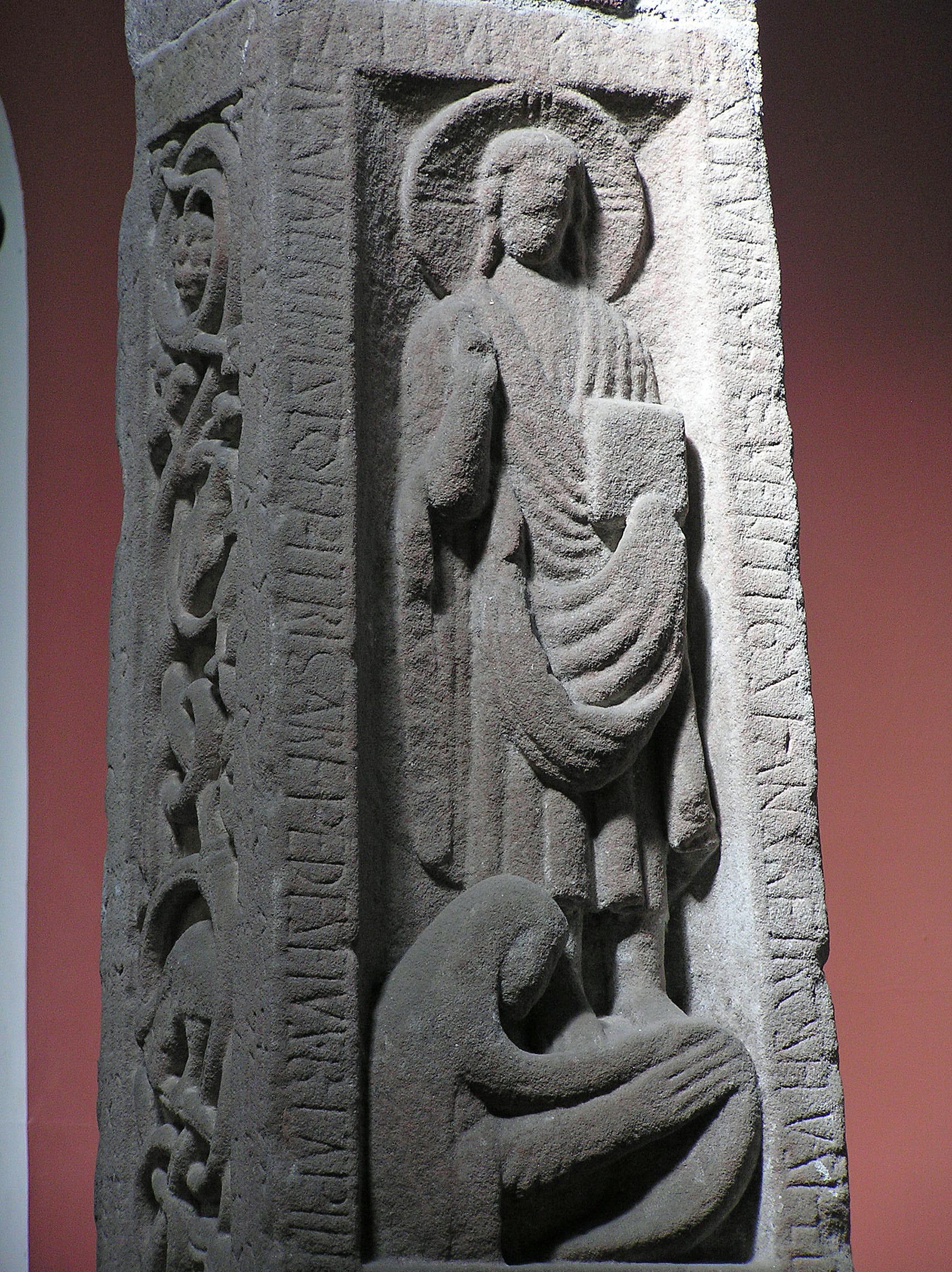
The Ruthwell Cross, 8th century AD

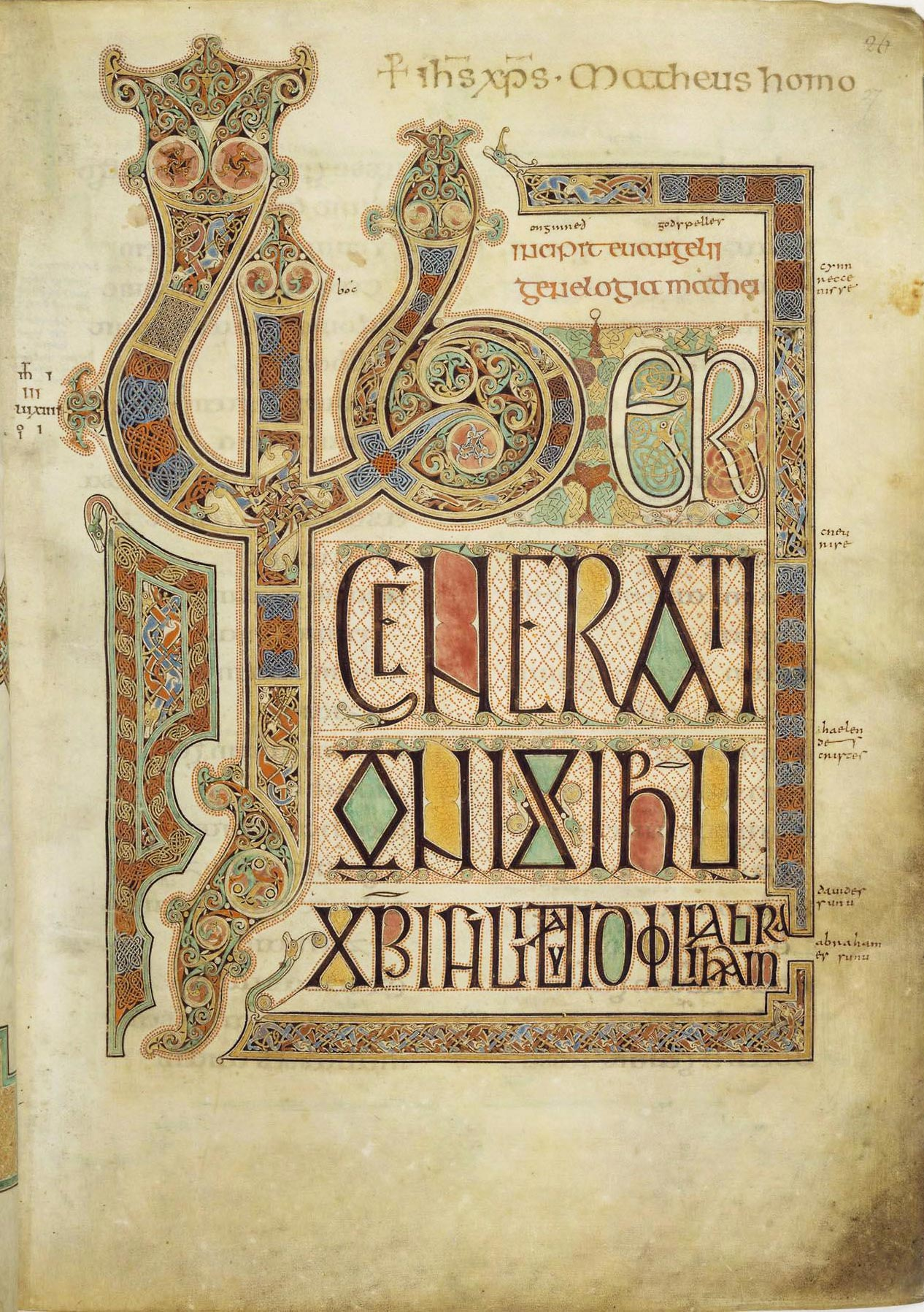
Folio 27r from the Lindisfarne Gospels, c. 720 AD

Christianisation of Anglo-Saxon England began around 600 AD, influenced by Celtic Christianity from the northwest and the Roman Catholic Church from the southeast. Augustine, the first Archbishop of Canterbury, took office in 597. In 601, he baptised the first Christian Anglo-Saxon king, Æthelberht of Kent. The last pagan Anglo-Saxon king, Penda of Mercia, died in 655. The last pagan Jutish king, Arwald of the Isle of Wight was killed in 686. The Anglo-Saxon mission on the continent took off in the 8th century, leading to the Christianisation of practically all of the Frankish Empire by 800.

Throughout the 7th and 8th centuries, power fluctuated between the larger kingdoms. Bede records Æthelberht of Kent as being dominant at the close of the 6th century, but power seems to have shifted northwards to the kingdom of Northumbria, which was formed from the amalgamation of Bernicia and Deira. Edwin of Northumbria probably held dominance over much of Britain, though Bede's Northumbrian bias should be kept in mind. Due to succession crises, Northumbrian hegemony was not constant, and Mercia remained a very powerful kingdom, especially under Penda. Two defeats ended Northumbrian dominance: the Battle of the Trent in 679 against Mercia, and Nechtanesmere in 685 against the Picts.

The so-called "Mercian Supremacy" dominated the 8th century, though it was not constant. Aethelbald and Offa, the two most powerful kings, achieved high status; indeed, Offa was considered the overlord of south Britain by Charlemagne. His power is illustrated by the fact that he summoned the resources to build Offa's Dyke. However, a rising Wessex, and challenges from smaller kingdoms, kept Mercian power in check, and by the early 9th century the "Mercian Supremacy" was over.

This period has been described as the Heptarchy, though this term has now fallen out of academic use. The term arose because the seven kingdoms of Northumbria, Mercia, Kent, East Anglia, Essex, Sussex and Wessex were the main polities of south Britain. Other small kingdoms were also politically important across this period: Hwicce, Magonsaete, Lindsey and Middle Anglia.

=== Viking challenge and the rise of Wessex ===
England in 878

The first recorded landing of Vikings took place in 787 in Dorsetshire, on the south-west coast. The first major attack in Britain was in 793 at Lindisfarne monastery as given by the Anglo-Saxon Chronicle. However, by then the Vikings were almost certainly well-established in Orkney and Shetland, and many other non-recorded raids probably occurred before this. Records do show the first Viking attack on Iona taking place in 794. The arrival of the Vikings (in particular the Danish Great Heathen Army) upset the political and social geography of Britain and Ireland. In 867 Northumbria fell to the Danes; East Anglia fell in 869. Though Wessex managed to contain the Vikings by defeating them at Ashdown in 871, a second invading army landed, leaving the Saxons on a defensive footing. At much the same time, Æthelred, king of Wessex died and was succeeded by his younger brother Alfred. Alfred was immediately confronted with the task of defending Wessex against the Danes. He spent the first five years of his reign paying the invaders off. In 878, Alfred's forces were overwhelmed at Chippenham in a surprise attack.

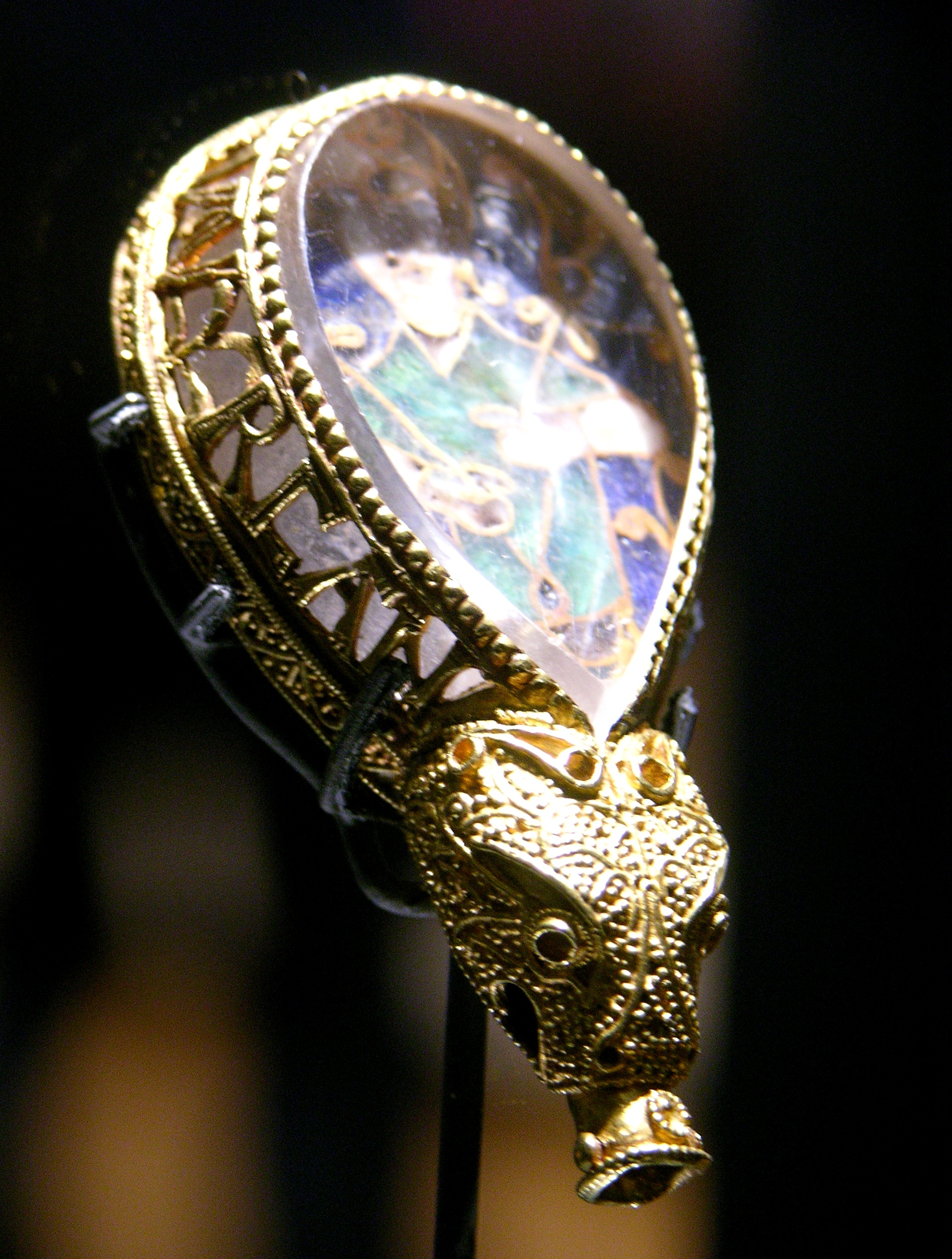
The Alfred Jewel, late 9th century

It was only now, with the independence of Wessex hanging by a thread, that Alfred emerged as a great king. In May 878 he led a force that defeated the Danes at Edington. The victory was so complete that the Danish leader, Guthrum, was forced to accept Christian baptism and withdraw from Mercia. Alfred then set about strengthening the defences of Wessex, building a new navy—60 vessels strong. Alfred's success bought Wessex and Mercia years of peace and sparked economic recovery in previously ravaged areas.

Alfred's success was sustained by his son Edward, whose decisive victories over the Danes in East Anglia in 910 and 911 were followed by a crushing victory at Tempsford in 917. These military gains allowed Edward to fully incorporate Mercia into his kingdom and add East Anglia to his conquests. Edward then set about reinforcing his northern borders against the Danish kingdom of Northumbria. Edward's rapid conquest of the English kingdoms meant Wessex received homage from those that remained, including Gwynedd in Wales and Scotland. His dominance was reinforced by his son Æthelstan, who extended the borders of Wessex northward, in 927 conquering the Kingdom of York and leading a land and naval invasion of Scotland. These conquests led to his adopting the title 'King of the English' for the first time.

The dominance and independence of England was maintained by the kings that followed. It was not until 978 and the accession of Æthelred the Unready that the Danish threat resurfaced. Two powerful Danish kings (Harold Bluetooth and later his son Sweyn) both launched devastating invasions of England. Anglo-Saxon forces were resoundingly defeated at Maldon in 991. More Danish attacks followed, and their victories were frequent. Æthelred's control over his nobles began to falter, and he grew increasingly desperate. His solution was to pay off the Danes: for almost 20 years he paid increasingly large sums to the Danish nobles to keep them from English coasts. These payments, known as Danegelds, crippled the English economy.

Æthelred then made an alliance with Normandy in 1001 through marriage to the Duke's daughter Emma, in the hope of strengthening England. Then he made a great error: in 1002 he ordered the massacre of all the Danes in England. In response, Sweyn began a decade of devastating attacks on England. Northern England, with its sizable Danish population, sided with Sweyn. By 1013, London, Oxford, and Winchester had fallen to the Danes. Æthelred fled to Normandy and Sweyn seized the throne. Sweyn suddenly died in 1014, and Æthelred returned to England, confronted by Sweyn's successor, Cnut. However, in 1016, Æthelred also suddenly died. Cnut swiftly defeated the remaining Saxons, killing Æthelred's son Edmund in the process. Cnut seized the throne, crowning himself King of England.

=== English unification ===
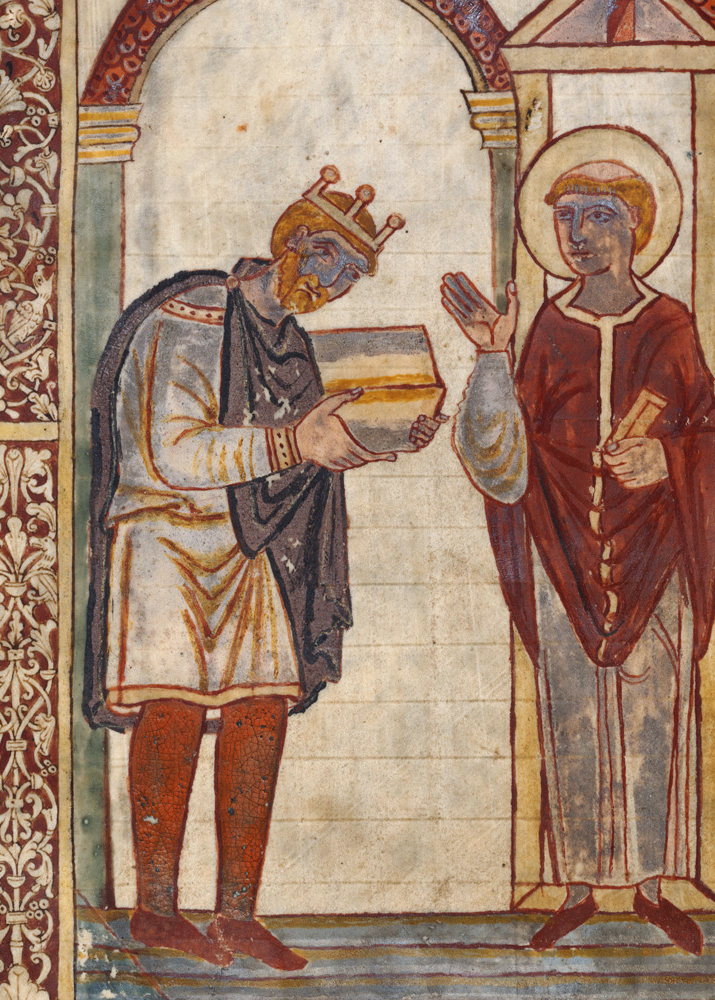
Frontispiece of Bede's Life of St Cuthbert, showing King Æthelstan presenting a copy of the book to the saint himself. c. 930

Alfred of Wessex died in 899 and was succeeded by his son Edward the Elder. Edward, and his brother-in-law Æthelred of (what was left of) Mercia, began a programme of expansion, building forts and towns on an Alfredian model. On Æthelred's death, his wife (Edward's sister) Æthelflæd ruled as "Lady of the Mercians" and continued expansion. It seems Edward had his son Æthelstan brought up in the Mercian court. On Edward's death, Æthelstan succeeded to the Mercian kingdom, and, after some uncertainty, Wessex.

Æthelstan continued the expansion of his father and aunt and was the first king to achieve direct rulership of what we would now consider England. The titles attributed to him in charters and on coins suggest a still more widespread dominance. His expansion aroused ill-feeling among the other kingdoms of Britain, and he defeated a combined Scottish-Viking army at the Battle of Brunanburh. However, the unification of England was not a certainty. Under Æthelstan's successors Edmund and Eadred the English kings repeatedly lost and regained control of Northumbria. Nevertheless, Edgar, who ruled the same expanse as Æthelstan, consolidated the kingdom, which remained united thereafter.

=== England under the Danes and the Norman conquest ===
There were renewed Scandinavian attacks on England at the end of the 10th century. Æthelred ruled a long reign but ultimately lost his kingdom to Sweyn of Denmark, though he recovered it following the latter's death. However, Æthelred's son Edmund II Ironside died shortly afterwards, allowing Cnut, Sweyn's son, to become king of England. Under his rule the kingdom became the centre of government for the North Sea empire which included Denmark and Norway.

Cnut was succeeded by his sons, but in 1042 the native dynasty was restored with the accession of Edward the Confessor. Edward's failure to produce an heir caused a furious conflict over the succession on his death in 1066. His struggles for power against Godwin, Earl of Wessex, the claims of Cnut's Scandinavian successors, and the ambitions of the Normans whom Edward introduced to English politics to bolster his own position caused each to vie for control of Edward's reign.

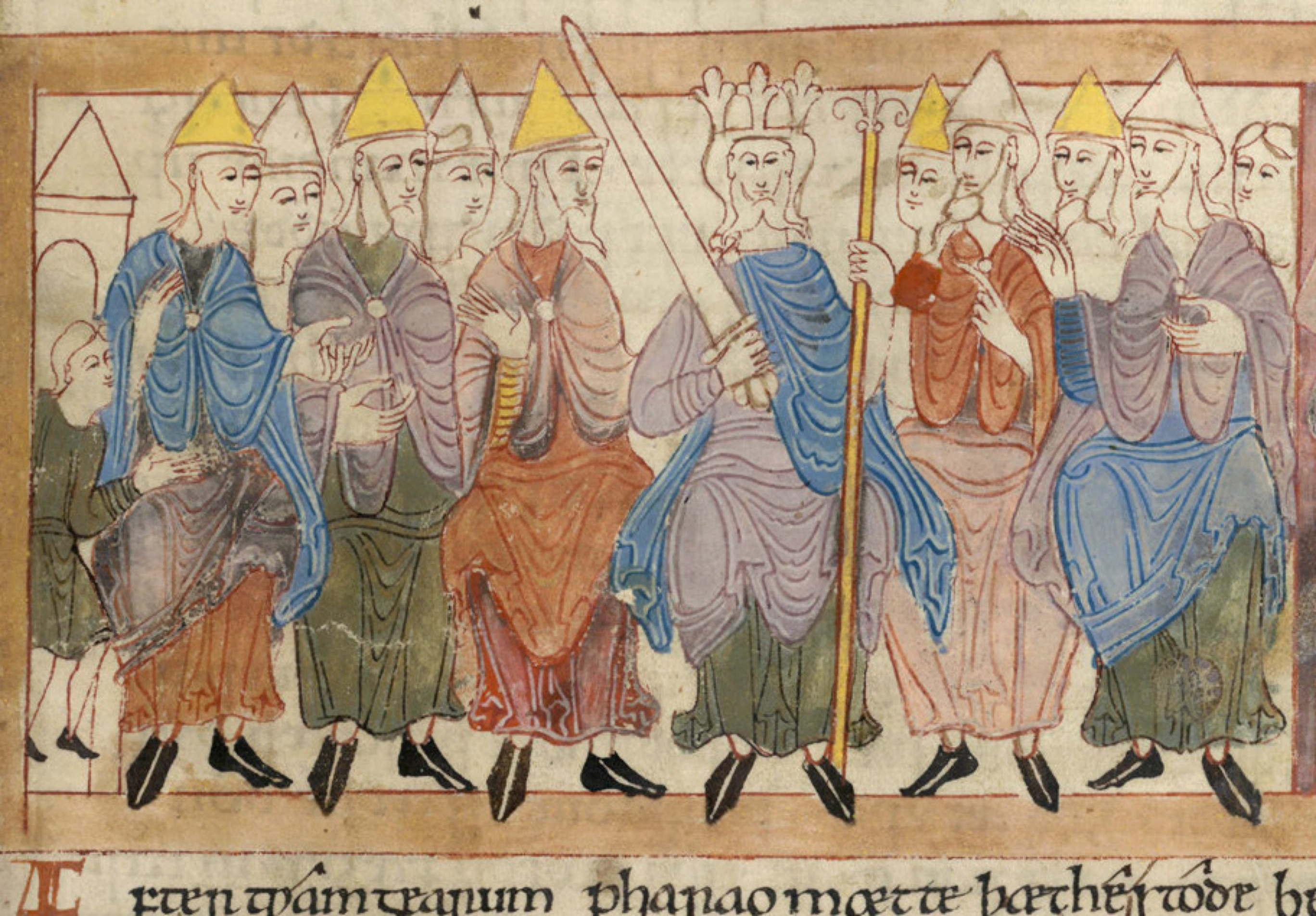
Anglo-Saxon king with his Witan. Biblical scene in the Old English Hexateuch (11th century)

Harold Godwinson became king, probably appointed by Edward on his deathbed and endorsed by the Witan. But William of Normandy, Harald Hardråde (aided by Harold Godwin's estranged brother Tostig) and Sweyn II of Denmark all asserted claims to the throne. By far the strongest hereditary claim was that of Edgar the Ætheling, but due to his youth and apparent lack of powerful supporters, he did not play a major part in the struggles of 1066, although he was made king for a short time by the Witan after the death of Harold Godwinson.

In September 1066, Harald III of Norway and Earl Tostig landed in Northern England with a force of around 15,000 men and 300 longships. Harold Godwinson defeated the invaders and killed Harald III of Norway and Tostig at the Battle of Stamford Bridge.

On 28 September 1066, William of Normandy invaded England in a campaign called the Norman Conquest. After marching from Yorkshire, Harold's exhausted army was defeated and Harold was killed at the Battle of Hastings on 14 October. Further opposition to William in support of Edgar the Ætheling soon collapsed, and William was crowned king on Christmas Day 1066. For five years, he faced a series of rebellions in various parts of England and a half-hearted Danish invasion, but he subdued them and established an enduring regime.

== Norman England ==
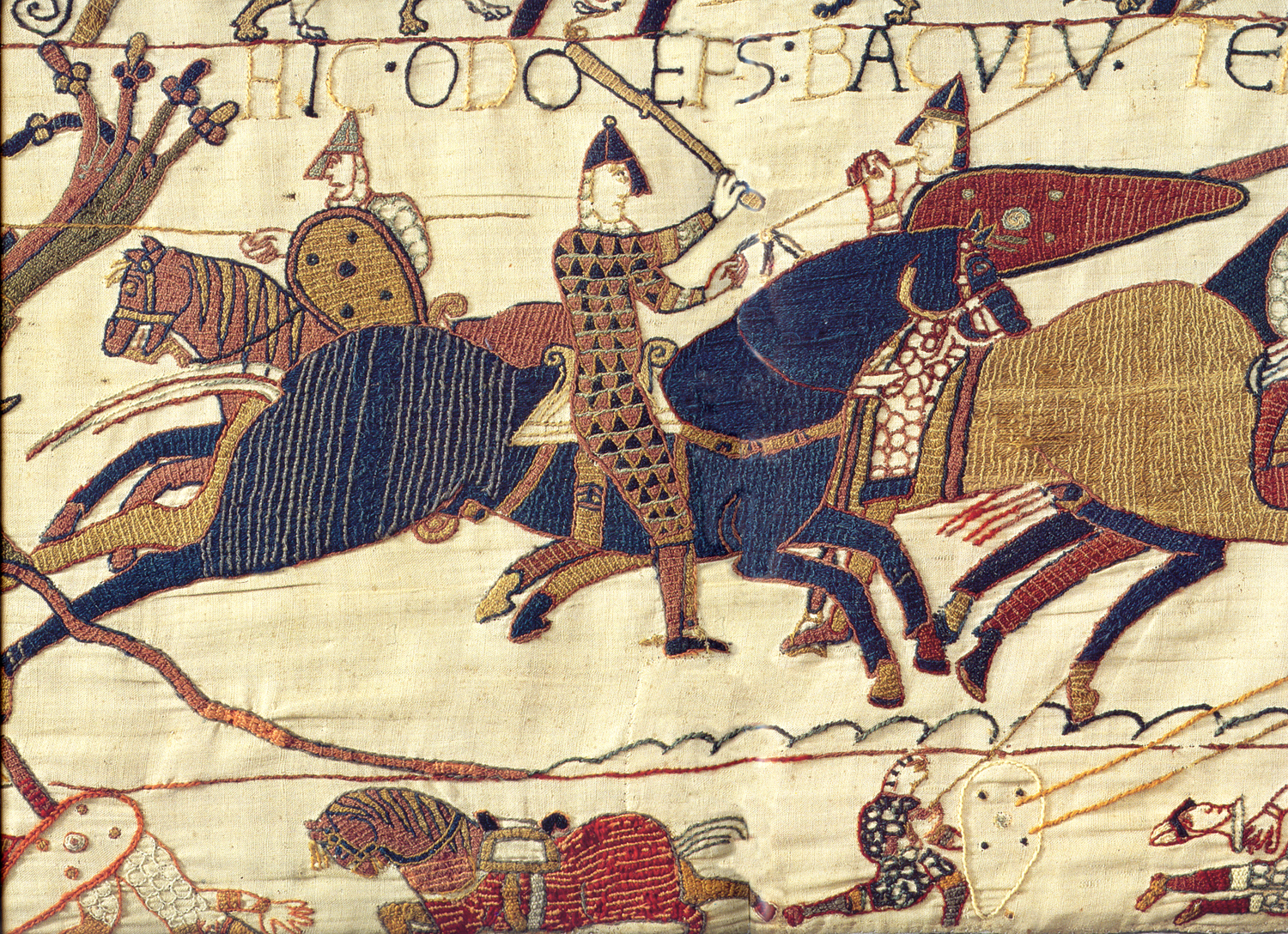
Depiction of the Battle of Hastings (1066) on the Bayeux Tapestry

The Norman Conquest led to a profound change in the history of the English state. William ordered the compilation of the Domesday Book, a survey of the entire population and their lands and property for tax purposes, which reveals that within 20 years of the conquest the English ruling class had been almost entirely dispossessed and replaced by Norman landholders, who monopolised all senior positions in the government and the Church. William and his nobles spoke and conducted court in Norman French, in both Normandy and England. The use of the Anglo-Norman language by the aristocracy endured for centuries and left an indelible mark in the development of modern English.

Upon being crowned, on Christmas Day 1066, William immediately began consolidating his power. By 1067, he faced revolts on all sides and spent four years crushing them. He then imposed his superiority over Scotland and Wales, forcing them to recognise him as overlord. Economic growth and state finances were aided by the beginning of Jewish settlement in London.

The English Middle Ages were characterised by civil war, international war, occasional insurrection, and widespread political intrigue among the aristocratic and monarchic elite. England was more than self-sufficient in cereals, dairy products, beef and mutton. Its international economy was based on wool trade, in which wool from the sheepwalks of northern England was exported to the textile cities of Flanders, where it was worked into cloth. Medieval foreign policy was as much shaped by relations with the Flemish textile industry as it was by dynastic adventures in western France. An English textile industry was established in the 15th century, providing the basis for rapid English capital accumulation.

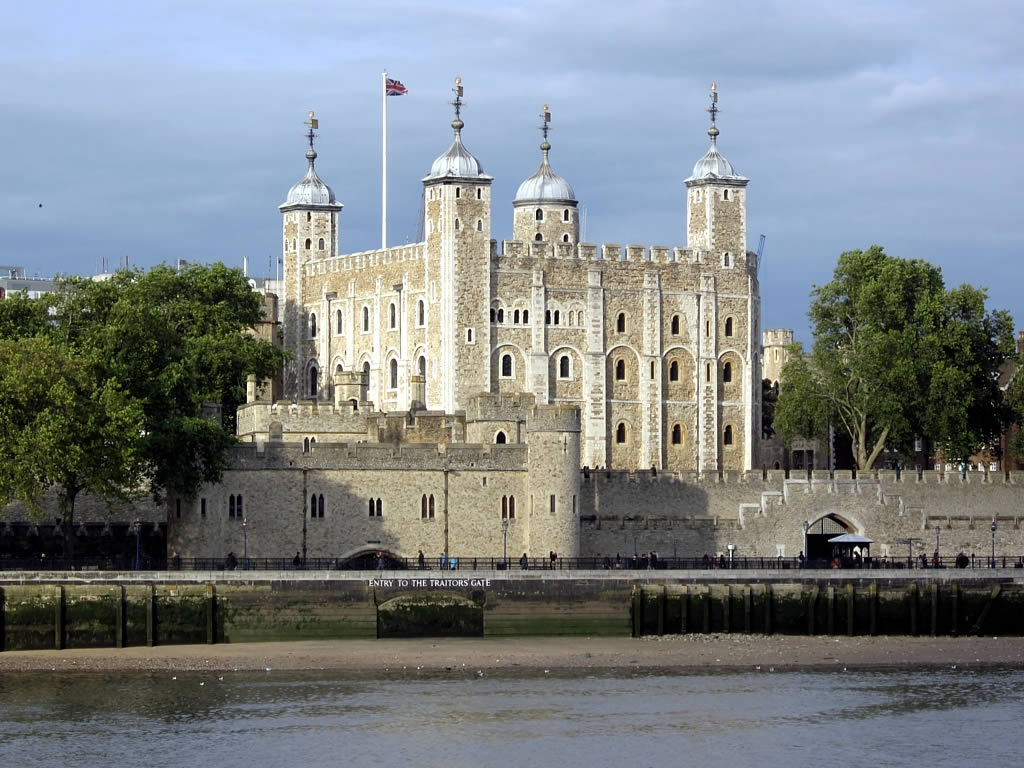
The White Tower of the Tower of London, built in 1078

Henry I, the fourth son of William I the Conqueror, succeeded his elder brother William II as King of England in 1100. Henry was also known as "Henry Beauclerc" because he received a formal education, unlike his older brother and heir apparent William who got practical training to be king. Henry worked hard to reform and stabilise the country and smooth the differences between the Anglo-Saxon and Anglo-Norman societies. The loss of his son, William Adelin, in the wreck of the White Ship in November 1120, undermined his reforms. This problem regarding succession cast a long shadow over English history.

Henry I had required the leading barons, ecclesiastics and officials in Normandy and England, to take an oath to accept Matilda (also known as Empress Maud, Henry I's daughter) as his heir. England was far less than enthusiastic to accept an outsider, and a woman, as their ruler.

There is some evidence that Henry was unsure of his own hopes and the oath to make Matilda his heir. Probably Henry hoped Matilda would have a son and step aside as Queen Mother. Upon Henry's death, the Norman and English barons ignored Matilda's claim to the throne, and thus through a series of decisions, Stephen, Henry's favourite nephew, was welcomed by many in England and Normandy as their new king.

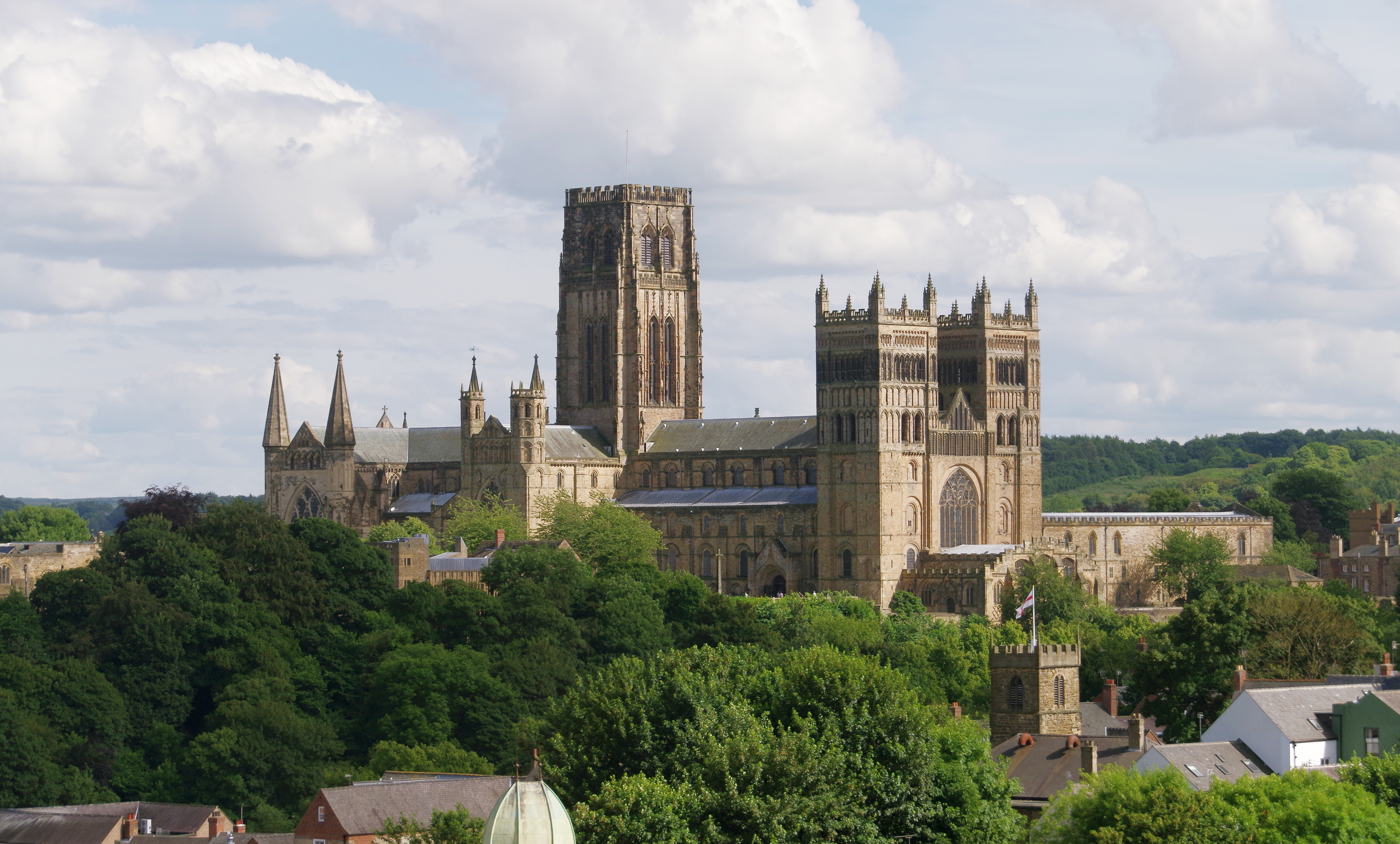
Durham Cathedral. The Norman cathedral was built 1093–1133

On 22 December 1135, Stephen was anointed king with implicit support by the church and nation. Matilda and her own son waited in France until she sparked the civil war from 1139 to 1153 known as the Anarchy. In the autumn of 1139, she invaded England with her illegitimate half-brother Robert of Gloucester. Her husband, Geoffroy V of Anjou, conquered Normandy but did not cross the channel to help his wife. During this breakdown of central authority, nobles built adulterine castles (i.e. castles erected without government permission), which were hated by the peasants, who were forced to build and maintain them.

Stephen was captured, and his government fell. Matilda was proclaimed queen but was soon at odds with her subjects and was expelled from London. The war continued until 1148, when Matilda returned to France. Stephen reigned unopposed until his death in 1154, although his hold on the throne was uneasy. As soon as he regained power, he began to demolish the adulterine castles, but kept a few castles standing, which put him at odds with his heir. His contested reign, civil war, and lawlessness saw a major swing in power towards feudal barons. In trying to appease Scottish and Welsh raiders, he handed over large tracts of land.

== England under the Plantagenets ==
=== The first Angevins ===
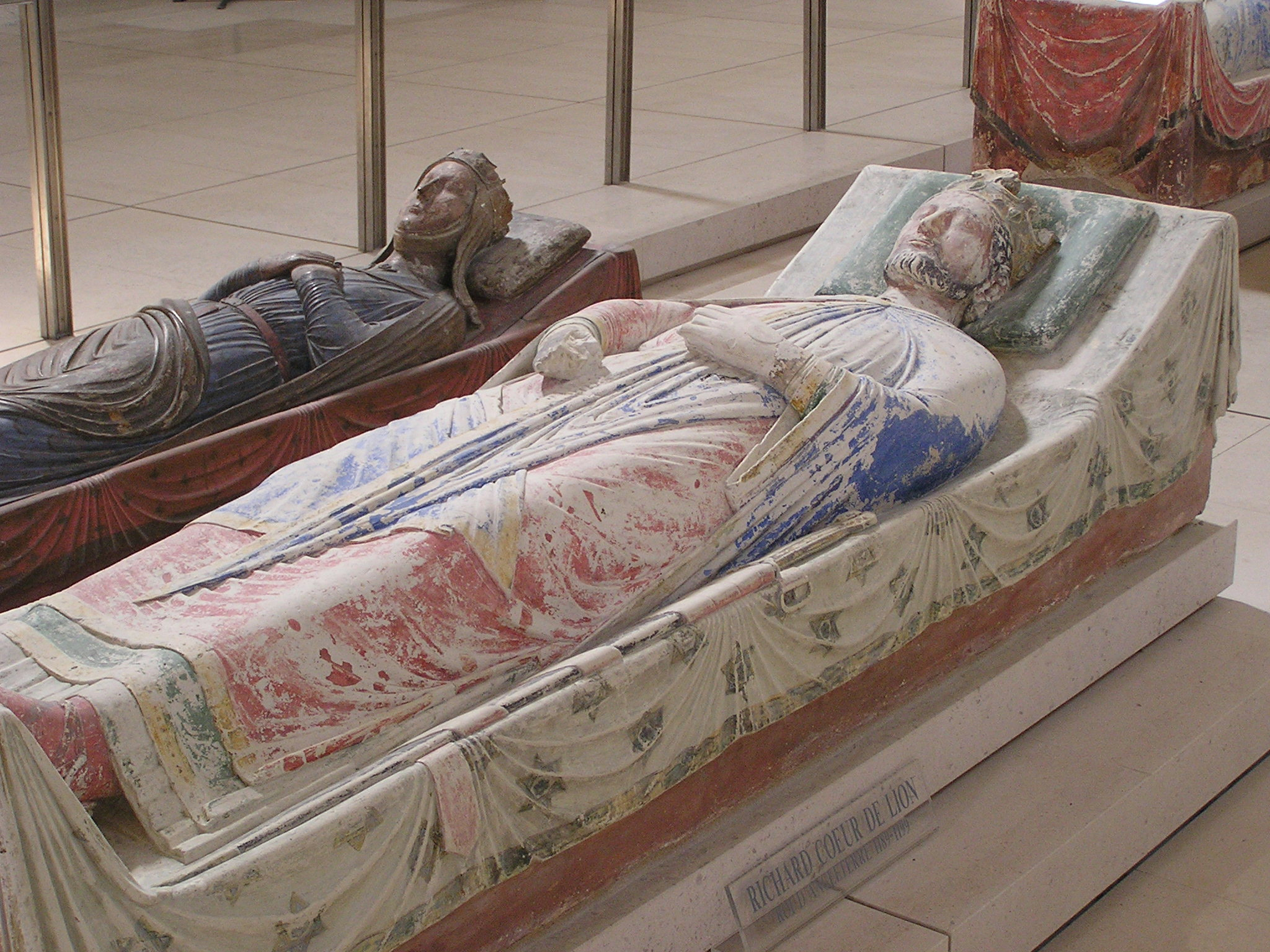
Tomb of Richard I of England and Isabella of Angoulême

Empress Matilda and Geoffrey's son, Henry, resumed the invasion; he was already Count of Anjou, Duke of Normandy and Duke of Aquitaine when he landed in England. When Stephen's son and heir apparent Eustace died in 1153, Stephen made an agreement with Henry of Anjou (who became Henry II) to succeed Stephen and guarantee peace between them. The union was retrospectively named the Angevin Empire. Henry II destroyed the remaining adulterine castles and expanded his power through various means and to different levels into Ireland, Scotland, Wales, Flanders, Nantes, Brittany, Quercy, Toulouse, Bourges and Auvergne.

The reign of Henry II represents a reversion in power from the barony to the monarchical state in England; it also saw a similar redistribution of legislative power from the Church, again to the monarchical state. This period also presaged a properly constituted legislation and a radical shift away from feudalism. In his reign, new Anglo-Angevin and Anglo-Aquitanian aristocracies developed, though not to the same degree as the Anglo-Norman once did, and the Norman nobles interacted with their French peers.

Henry's successor, Richard I "the Lion Heart" (also known as "the absent king"), was preoccupied with foreign wars, taking part in the Third Crusade, being captured while returning and pledging fealty to the Holy Roman Empire as part of his ransom, and defending his French territories against Philip II of France. His successor, his younger brother John, lost much of those territories including Normandy following the disastrous Battle of Bouvines in 1214, despite having made the Kingdom of England a tribute-paying vassal of the Holy See in 1212, which it remained until the 14th century when the Kingdom rejected the overlordship of the Holy See and re-established its sovereignty. The first anti-Semitic pogroms occurred in the wake of Richard's crusades, in 1189–90, in York and elsewhere. In York, 150 Jews died.

From 1212 onwards, John had a constant policy of maintaining close relations with the Pope, which partially explains how he persuaded the Pope to reject the legitimacy of Magna Carta.

=== Magna Carta ===
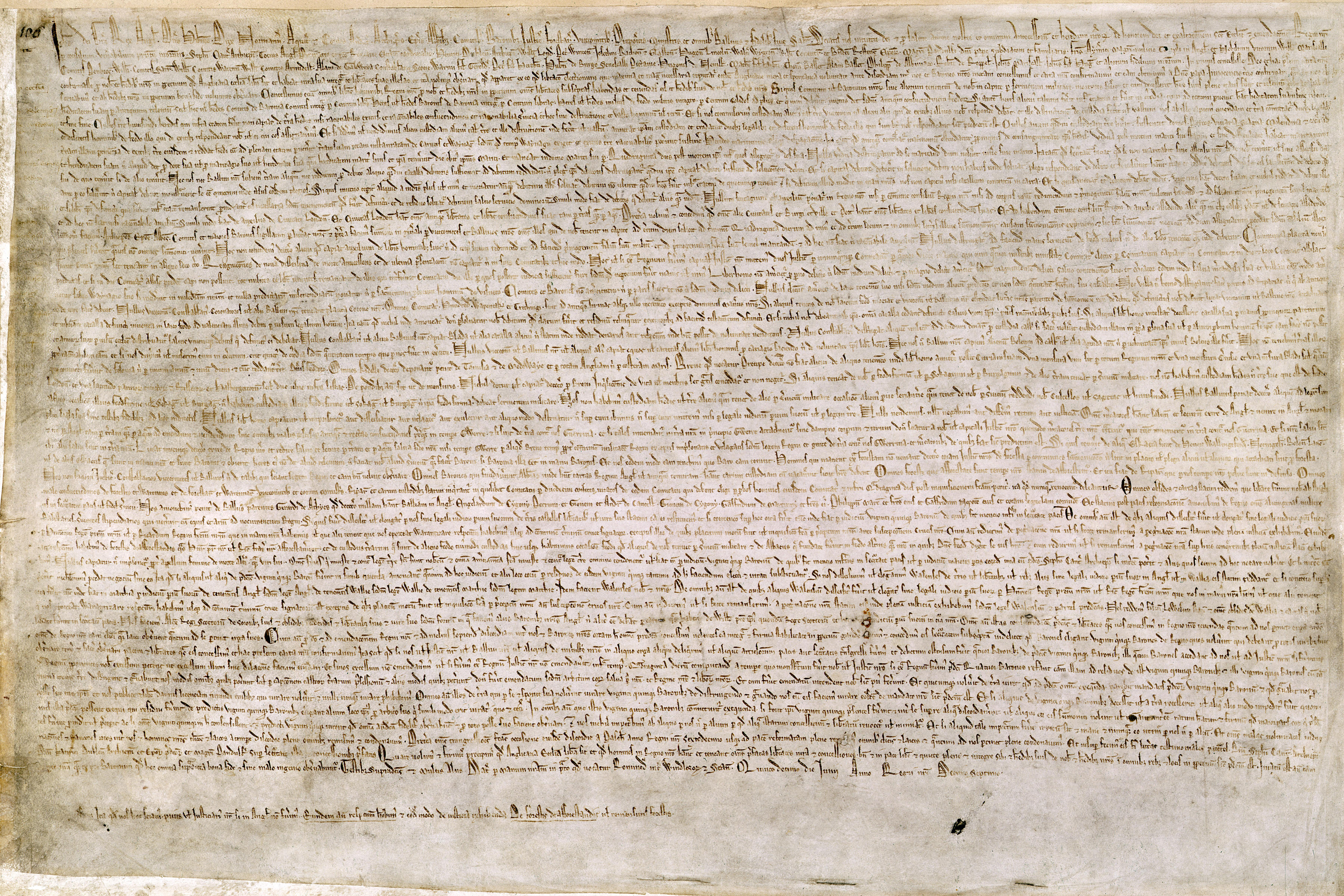
One of only four surviving exemplifications of the 1215 text, Cotton MS. Augustus II. 106, property of the British Library

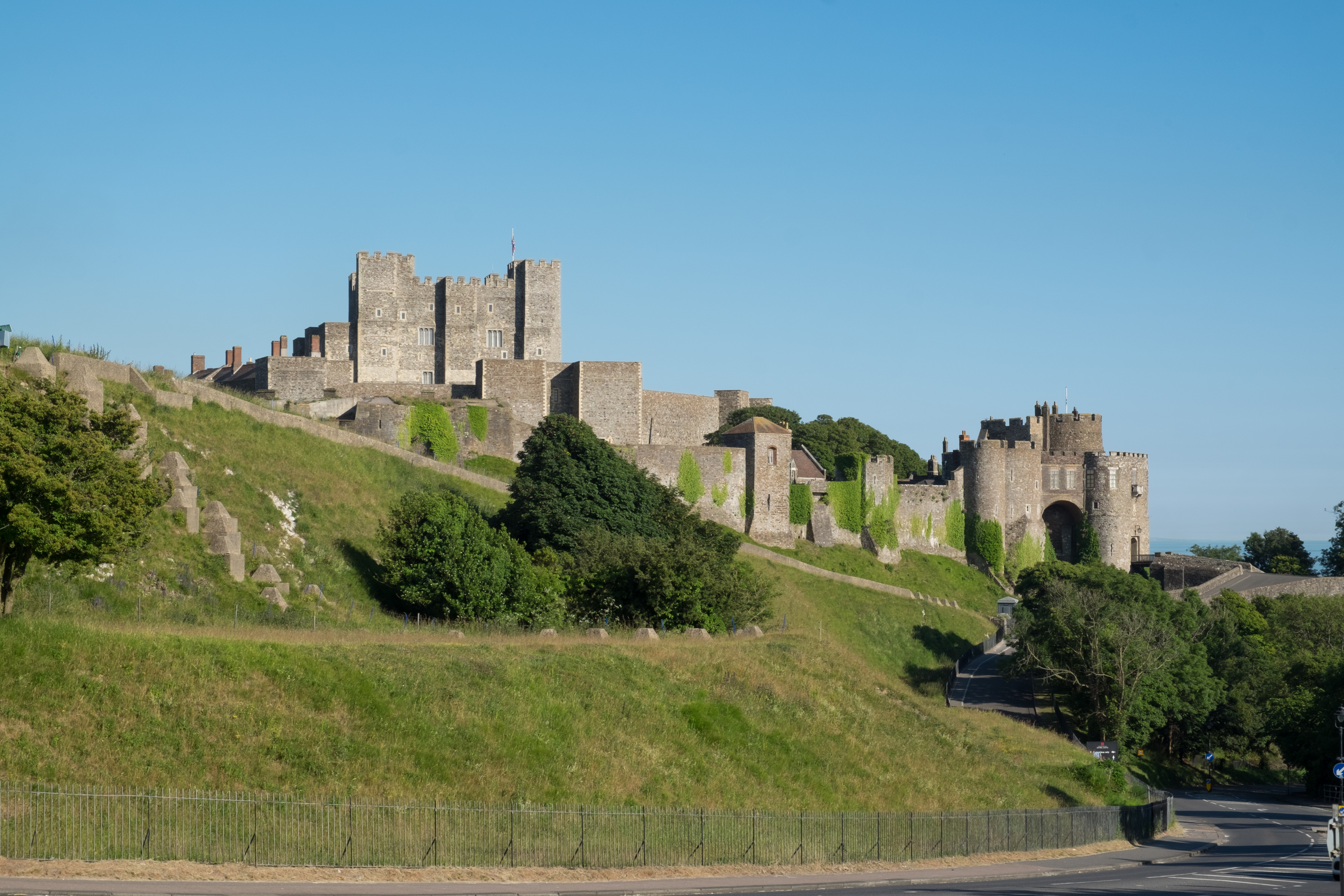
Dover Castle, 12th–13th century

Over the course of his reign, a combination of higher taxes, unsuccessful wars and conflict with the Pope made King John unpopular with his barons. In 1215, some of the most important barons rebelled against him. He met their leaders along with their French and Scot allies at Runnymede, near London on 15 June 1215 to seal the Great Charter (Magna Carta in Latin), which imposed legal limits on the king's personal powers. But as soon as hostilities ceased, John received approval from the Pope to break his word because he had made it under duress. This provoked the First Barons' War and a French invasion by Prince Louis of France invited by a majority of the English barons to replace John as king in London in May 1216. John travelled around the country to oppose the rebel forces, directing, among other operations, a two-month siege of the rebel-held Rochester Castle.

=== Henry III ===
John's son, Henry III, was only 9 years old when he became king (1216–1272). He spent much of his reign fighting the barons over Magna Carta and the royal rights, and was eventually forced to call the first "parliament" in 1264. He was also unsuccessful on the continent, where he endeavoured to re-establish English control over Normandy, Anjou, and Aquitaine.

His reign was punctuated by many rebellions and civil wars, often provoked by incompetence and mismanagement in government and Henry's perceived over-reliance on French courtiers (thus restricting the influence of the English nobility). One of these rebellions—led by a disaffected courtier, Simon de Montfort—was notable for its assembly of one of the earliest precursors to Parliament. In addition to fighting the Second Barons' War, Henry III made war against Louis IX and was defeated during the Saintonge War, yet Louis did not capitalise on his victory, respecting his opponent's rights.

Henry III's policies towards Jews began with relative tolerance, but became gradually more restrictive. In 1253 the Statute of Jewry reinforced physical segregation and demanded a previously notional requirement to wear square white badges. Henry III also backed an accusation of child murder in Lincoln, ordering a Jew Copin to be executed and 91 Jews to be arrested for trial; 18 were killed. Popular superstitious fears were fuelled, and Catholic theological hostility combined with Baronial abuse of loan arrangements, resulting in Simon de Montfort's supporters targeting of Jewish communities in their revolt. This hostility, violence and controversy was the background to the increasingly oppressive measures that followed under Edward I.

=== 14th century ===
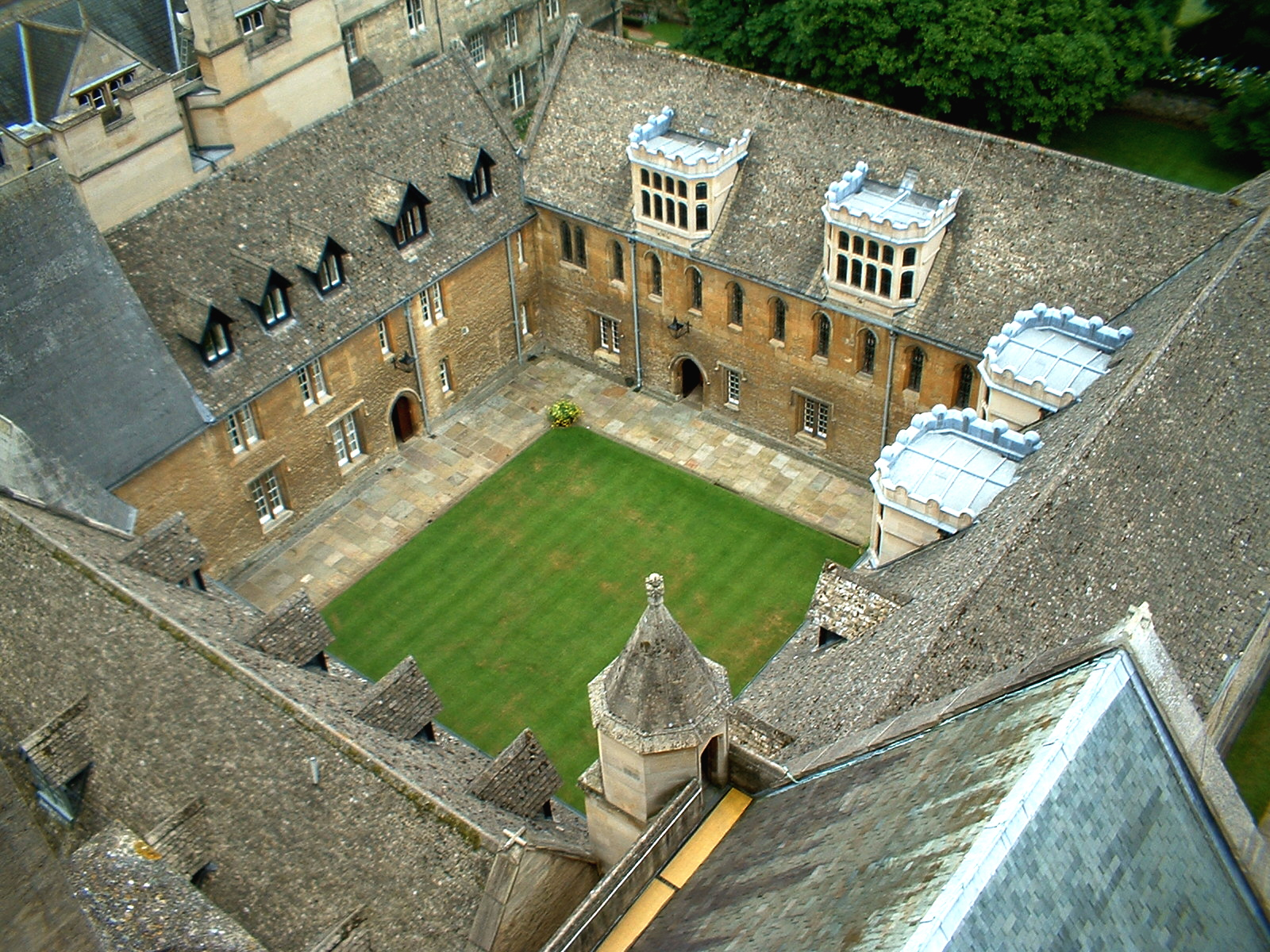
The Mob Quad of Merton College, University of Oxford, 13th–14th century

The reign of Edward I (reigned 1272–1307) was rather more successful. Edward enacted numerous laws strengthening the powers of his government, and he summoned the first officially sanctioned Parliaments of England (such as his Model Parliament). He conquered Wales and attempted to use a succession dispute to gain control of the Kingdom of Scotland, though this developed into a costly and drawn-out military campaign.

Edward I is also known for his policies first persecuting Jews, particularly the 1275 Statute of the Jewry. This banned Jews from their previous role in making loans, and demanded that they work as merchants, farmers, craftsmen or soldiers. This was unrealistic, and failed. Edward's solution was to expel Jews from England. This was the first statewide, permanent expulsion in Europe.

His son, Edward II, was considered a disaster by other nobles. A man who preferred to engage in activities like thatching and ditch-digging and associating with the lower class rather than the activities considered appropriate for the upper class such as jousting, hunting, or the usual entertainments of kings, he spent most of his reign trying in vain to control the nobility, who in return showed continual hostility to him. Meanwhile, the Scottish leader Robert Bruce began retaking all the territory conquered by Edward I. In 1314, the English army was disastrously defeated by the Scots at the Battle of Bannockburn. Edward also showered favours on his companion Piers Gaveston, a knight of humble birth. While it has been widely believed that Edward was homosexual because of his closeness to Gaveston, there is no concrete evidence of this. The king's enemies, including his cousin Thomas of Lancaster, captured and murdered Gaveston in 1312.

The Great Famine of 1315–1317 may have resulted in half a million deaths in England due to hunger and disease, more than 10 per cent of the population.

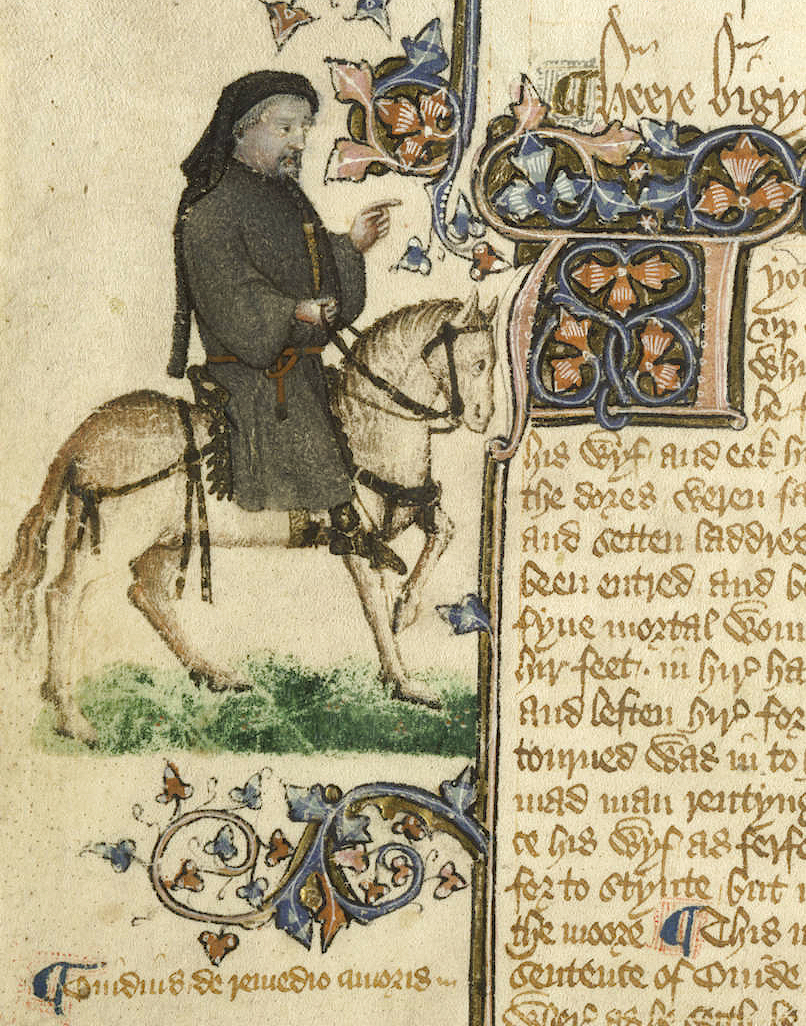
Geoffrey Chaucer, c. 1340s–1400, author of The Canterbury Tales

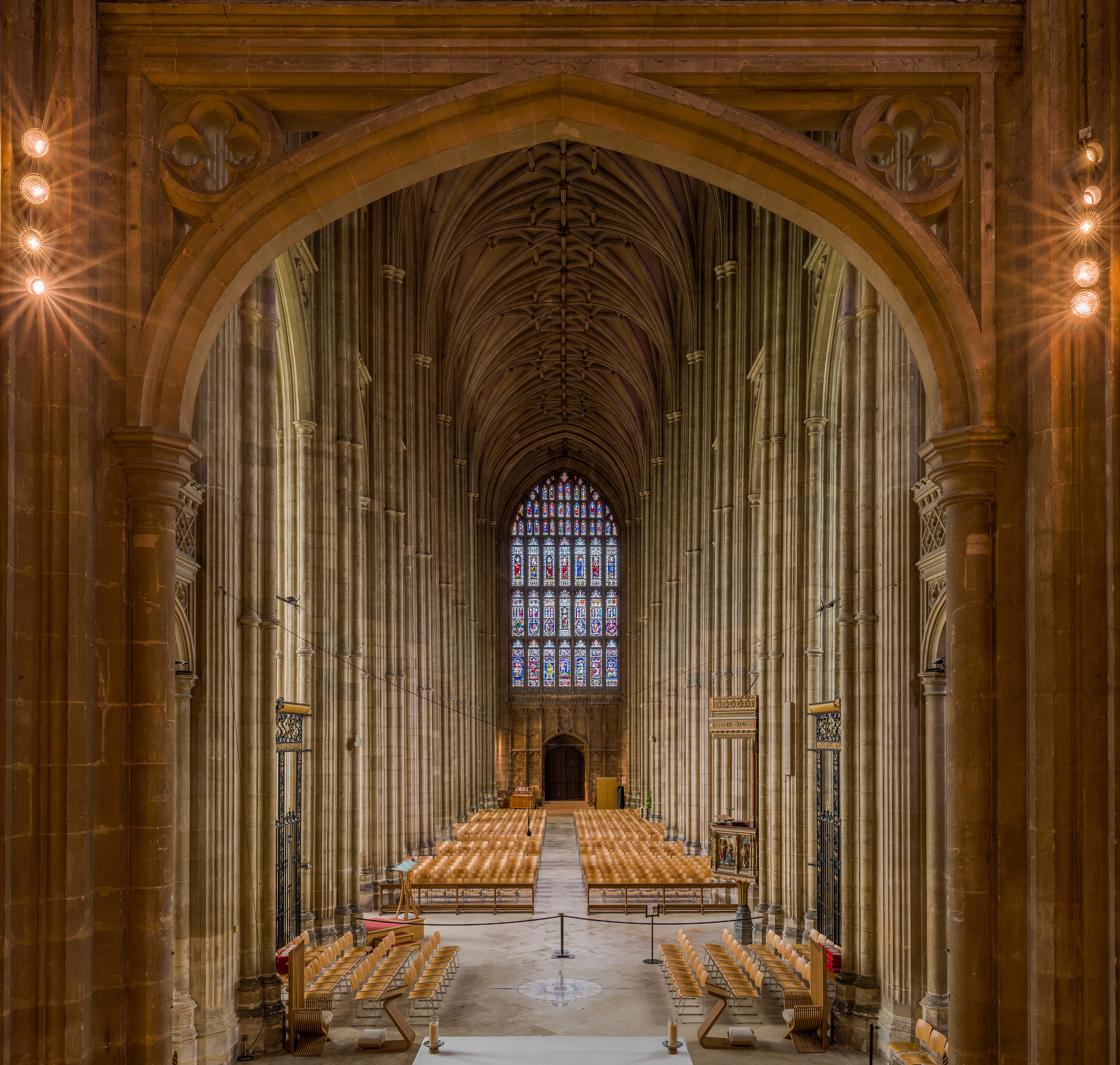
Canterbury Cathedral nave, 1377

Edward's downfall came in 1326 when his wife, Queen Isabella, travelled to her native France and, with her lover Roger Mortimer, invaded England. Despite their tiny force, they quickly rallied support for their cause. The king fled London, and his companion since Piers Gaveston's death, Hugh Despenser, was publicly tried and executed. Edward was captured, charged with breaking his coronation oath, deposed and imprisoned in Gloucestershire until he was murdered some time in the autumn of 1327, presumably by agents of Isabella and Mortimer.

Edward III, son of Edward II, was crowned at age 14 after his father was deposed by his mother and Roger Mortimer. At age 17, he led a successful coup against Mortimer, the de facto ruler of the country, and began his personal reign. Edward III reigned 1327–1377, restored royal authority and went on to transform England into the most efficient military power in Europe. His reign saw vital developments in legislature and government—in particular the evolution of the English parliament—as well as the ravages of the Black Death. After defeating, but not subjugating, the Kingdom of Scotland, he declared himself rightful heir to the French throne in 1338, but his claim was denied due to the Salic law. This started what would become known as the Hundred Years' War. Following some initial setbacks, the war went exceptionally well for England; victories at Crécy and Poitiers led to the highly favourable Treaty of Brétigny. Edward's later years were marked by international failure and domestic strife, largely as a result of his inactivity and poor health.

For many years, trouble had been brewing with Castile—a Spanish kingdom whose navy had taken to raiding English merchant ships in the Channel. Edward won a major naval victory against a Castilian fleet off Winchelsea in 1350. Although the Castilian crossbowmen killed many of the enemy, the English gradually got the better of the encounter. In spite of Edward's success, however, Winchelsea was only a flash in a conflict that raged between the English and the Spanish for over 200 years, coming to a head with the defeats of the Spanish Armada and the English Armada in 1588 and 1589.

In 1373, England signed an alliance with the Kingdom of Portugal, which is claimed to be the oldest alliance in the world still in force.

Edward III died of a stroke on 21 June 1377, and was succeeded by his ten-year-old grandson, Richard II. He married Anne of Bohemia, daughter of Charles IV, Holy Roman Emperor in 1382, and ruled until he was deposed by his first cousin Henry IV in 1399. In 1381, a Peasants' Revolt led by Wat Tyler spread across large parts of England. It was suppressed by Richard II, with the death of 1500 rebels.

=== A Time of Turmoil ===
The Black Death, an epidemic of bubonic plague that spread all over Europe, arrived in England in 1348 and killed as much as a third to half the population. Military conflicts during this period were usually with domestic neighbours such as the Welsh, Irish, and Scots, and included the Hundred Years' War against the French and their Scottish allies. Notable English victories in the Hundred Years' War included Crécy and Agincourt. The final defeat of the uprising led by the Welsh prince, Owain Glyndŵr, in 1412 by Prince Henry (who later became Henry V) represents the last major armed attempt by the Welsh to throw off English rule.

Edward III gave land to powerful noble families, including many people of royal lineage. Because land was equivalent to power, these powerful men could try to claim the crown. When Edward III died in 1377, he was succeeded by his grandson, Richard II. Richard's autocratic and arrogant methods only served to alienate the nobility more, and his forceful dispossession in 1399 by Henry IV increased the turmoil.

Henry spent much of his reign defending himself against plots, rebellions and assassination attempts.

Rebellions continued throughout the first ten years of Henry's reign, including the revolt of Owain Glyndŵr, who declared himself Prince of Wales in 1400, and the rebellion of Henry Percy, 1st Earl of Northumberland. The king's success in putting down these rebellions was due partly to the military ability of his eldest son, Henry of Monmouth, who later became king (though the son managed to seize much effective power from his father in 1410).

=== 15th century – Henry V and the Wars of the Roses ===
Henry V succeeded to the throne in 1413. He renewed hostilities with France and began a set of military campaigns which are considered a new phase of the Hundred Years' War, referred to as the Lancastrian War. He won several notable victories over the French, including the Battle of Agincourt. In the Treaty of Troyes, Henry V was given the power to succeed the current ruler of France, Charles VI of France. The Treaty also provided that he would marry Charles VI's daughter, Catherine of Valois. They married in 1421. Henry died of dysentery in 1422, leaving a number of unfulfilled plans, including his plan to take over as King of France and to lead a crusade to retake Jerusalem from the Muslims.

Henry V's son, Henry VI, became king in 1422 as an infant. His reign was marked by constant turmoil due to his political weaknesses. While he was growing up, England was ruled by the Regency government.

The Regency Council tried to install Henry VI as the King of France, as provided by the Treaty of Troyes signed by his father, and led English forces to take over areas of France. It appeared they might succeed due to the poor political position of the son of Charles VI, who had claimed to be the rightful king as Charles VII of France. However, in 1429, Joan of Arc began a military effort to prevent the English from gaining control of France. The French forces regained control of French territory.

In 1437, Henry VI came of age and began to actively rule as king. To forge peace, he married French noblewoman Margaret of Anjou in 1445, as provided in the Treaty of Tours. Hostilities with France resumed in 1449. When England lost the Hundred Years' War in August 1453, Henry fell into mental breakdown until Christmas 1454.

Henry could not control the feuding nobles, and a series of civil wars known as the Wars of the Roses began, lasting from 1455 to 1485. Although the fighting was very sporadic and small, there was a general breakdown in the power of the Crown. The royal court and Parliament moved to Coventry, in the Lancastrian heartlands, which thus became the capital of England until 1461. Henry's cousin Edward, Duke of York, deposed Henry in 1461 to become Edward IV following a Lancastrian defeat at the Battle of Mortimer's Cross. Edward was later briefly expelled from the throne in 1470–1471 when Richard Neville, Earl of Warwick, brought Henry back to power. Six months later, Edward defeated and killed Warwick in battle and reclaimed the throne. Henry was imprisoned in the Tower of London and died there.

Edward died in 1483, only 40 years old, his reign having gone a little way to restoring the power of the Crown. His eldest son and heir Edward V, aged 12, could not succeed him because the king's brother, Richard III, Duke of Gloucester, declared Edward IV's marriage bigamous, making all his children illegitimate. Richard III was then declared king, and Edward V and his 10-year-old brother Richard were imprisoned in the Tower of London. The two were never seen again. It was widely believed that Richard III had them murdered and he was reviled as a treacherous fiend, which limited his ability to govern during his brief reign. In summer 1485, Henry Tudor, the last Lancastrian male, returned from exile in France and landed in Wales. Henry then defeated and killed Richard III at Bosworth Field on 22 August, and was crowned Henry VII.

== Tudor England ==
=== Henry VII ===
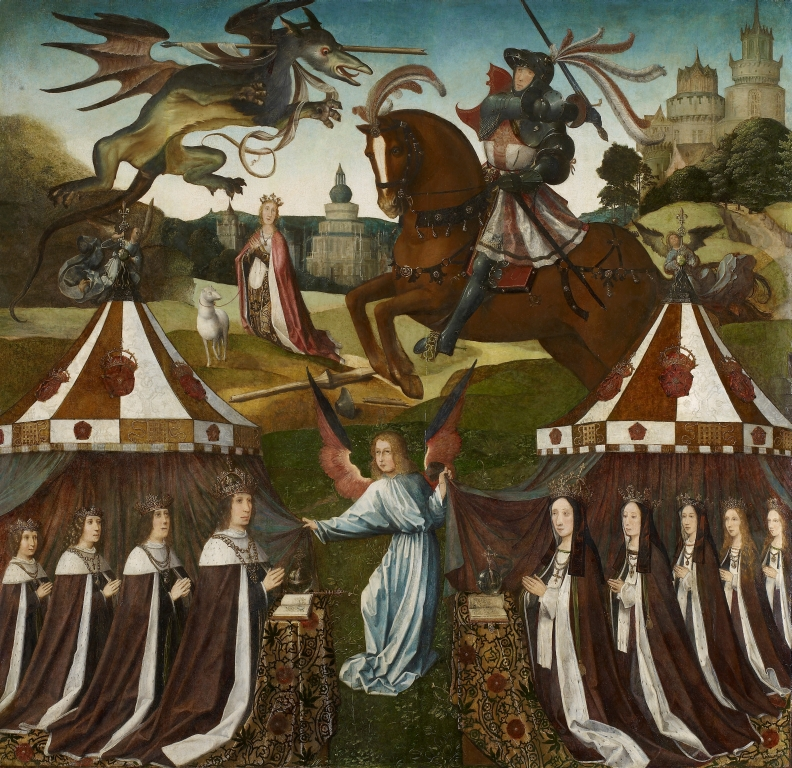
Portrait of the Royal Tudors. At left, Henry VII, with Prince Arthur behind him, then Prince Henry (later Henry VIII), and Prince Edmund, who did not survive early childhood. To the right is Elizabeth of York, with Princess Margaret, then Princess Elizabeth who didn't survive childhood, Princess Mary, and Princess Katherine, who died shortly after her birth.

The Tudor period coincides with the dynasty of the House of Tudor in England that began with the reign of Henry VII. Henry engaged in a number of administrative, economic and diplomatic initiatives. He paid very close attention to detail and, instead of spending lavishly, concentrated on raising new revenues. Henry was successful in restoring power and stability to the nation's monarchy following the civil war. His supportive policy toward England's wool industry and his standoff with the Low Countries had long-lasting benefit to the economy of England. He restored the nation's finances and strengthened its judicial system. The Renaissance reached England through Italian courtiers, who reintroduced artistic, educational and scholarly debate from classical antiquity. England began to develop naval skills, and exploration intensified in the Age of Discovery.

With Henry VII's accession to the throne in 1485, the Wars of the Roses came to an end, and Tudors would continue to rule England for 118 years. Traditionally, the Battle of Bosworth Field is considered to mark the end of the Middle Ages in England, although Henry did not introduce any new concept of monarchy, and for most of his reign his hold on power was tenuous. He claimed the throne by conquest and God's judgement in battle. Parliament quickly recognised him as king, but the Yorkists were far from defeated. Nonetheless, he married Edward IV's eldest daughter Elizabeth in January 1486, thereby uniting the houses of York and Lancaster.

Most of the European rulers did not believe Henry would survive long, and were thus willing to shelter claimants against him. The first plot against him was the Stafford and Lovell rebellion of 1486, which presented no serious threat. But Richard III's nephew John de la Pole, Earl of Lincoln, hatched another attempt the following year. Using a peasant boy named Lambert Simnel, who posed as Edward, Earl of Warwick (the real Warwick was locked up in the Tower of London), he led an army of 2,000 German mercenaries paid for by Margaret of Burgundy into England. They were defeated and de la Pole was killed at the difficult Battle of Stoke, where the loyalty of some of the royal troops to Henry was questionable. The king, realizing that Simnel was a dupe, employed him in the royal kitchen.

A more serious threat was Perkin Warbeck, a Flemish youth who posed as Edward IV's son Richard. Again with support from Margaret of Burgundy, he invaded England four times from 1495 to 1497 before he was captured and imprisoned in the Tower of London. Both Warbeck and the Earl of Warwick were dangerous even in captivity, and Henry executed them in 1499 before Ferdinand and Isabella of Spain would allow their daughter Catherine to come to England and marry his son Arthur.

In 1497, Henry defeated Cornish rebels marching on London. The rest of his reign was relatively peaceful, despite worries about succession after the death of his wife Elizabeth of York in 1503.

Henry VII's foreign policy was peaceful. He had made an alliance with Spain and the Holy Roman Emperor Maximilian I, but in 1493, when they went to war with France, England was dragged into the conflict. Impoverished and his hold on power insecure, Henry had no desire for war. He quickly reached an understanding with the French and renounced all claims to their territory except the port of Calais, realizing also that he could not stop them from incorporating the Duchy of Brittany. In return, the French agreed to recognize him as king and stop sheltering pretenders. Shortly afterwards, they became preoccupied with adventures in Italy. Henry also reached an understanding with Scotland, agreeing to marry his daughter Margaret to that country's king James IV.

Upon becoming king, Henry inherited a government severely weakened and degraded by the Wars of the Roses. The treasury was empty, having been drained by Edward IV's Woodville in-laws after his death. Through a tight fiscal policy and sometimes ruthless tax collection and confiscations, Henry refilled the treasury by the time of his death. He also effectively rebuilt the machinery of government.

In 1501, the king's son Arthur, having married Catherine of Aragon, died of illness at age 15, leaving his younger brother Henry, Duke of York as heir. When the king himself died in 1509, the position of the Tudors was secure at last, and his son succeeded him unopposed.

=== Henry VIII ===
King Henry VIII

Henry VIII began his reign with much optimism. The handsome, athletic young king stood in sharp contrast to his wary, miserly father. Henry's lavish court quickly drained the treasury of the fortune he inherited. He married the widowed Catherine of Aragon, and they had several children, but none survived infancy except a daughter, Mary.

In 1512, the young king started a war in France. Although England was an ally of Spain, one of France's principal enemies, the war was mostly about Henry's desire for personal glory, despite his sister Mary being married to the French king Louis XII. The war accomplished little. The English army suffered badly from disease, and Henry was not even present at the one notable victory, the Battle of the Spurs. Meanwhile, James IV of Scotland (despite being Henry's other brother-in-law), activated his alliance with the French and declared war on England. While Henry was dallying in France, Catherine, who was serving as regent in his absence, and his advisers were left to deal with this threat. At the Battle of Flodden on 9 September 1513, the Scots were completely defeated. James and most of the Scottish nobles were killed. When Henry returned from France, he was given credit for the victory.

Eventually, Catherine was no longer able to have any more children. The king became increasingly nervous about the possibility of his daughter Mary inheriting the throne, as England's one experience with a female sovereign, Matilda in the 12th century, had been a catastrophe. He eventually decided that it was necessary to divorce Catherine and find a new queen. To persuade the Church to allow this, Henry cited the passage in the Book of Leviticus: "If a man taketh his brother's wife, he hath committed adultery; they shall be childless". However, Catherine insisted that she and Arthur never consummated their brief marriage and that the prohibition did not apply here. The timing of Henry's case was very unfortunate; it was 1527 and the Pope had been imprisoned by emperor Charles V, Catherine's nephew and the most powerful man in Europe, for siding with his archenemy Francis I of France. Because he could not divorce in these circumstances, Henry seceded from the Church, in what became known as the English Reformation.

The newly established Church of England amounted to little more than the existing Catholic Church, but led by the king rather than the Pope. It took a number of years for the separation from Rome to be completed, and many were executed for resisting the king's religious policies.

In 1530, Catherine was banished from court and spent the rest of her life (until her death in 1536) alone in an isolated manor home, barred from contact with Mary. Secret correspondence continued thanks to her ladies-in-waiting. Their marriage was declared invalid, making Mary an illegitimate child. Henry married Anne Boleyn secretly in January 1533, just as his divorce from Catherine was finalised. They had a second, public wedding. Anne soon became pregnant and may have already been when they wed. But on 7 September 1533, she gave birth to a daughter, Elizabeth. The king was devastated at his failure to obtain a son after all the effort it had taken to remarry. Gradually, he came to develop a disliking of his new queen for her strange behaviour. In 1536, when Anne was pregnant again, Henry was badly injured in a jousting accident. Shaken by this, the queen gave birth prematurely to a stillborn boy. By now, the king was convinced that his marriage was hexed, and having already found a new queen, Jane Seymour, he put Anne in the Tower of London on charges of witchcraft. Afterwards, she was beheaded along with five men (her brother included) accused of adultery with her. The marriage was then declared invalid, so that Elizabeth, just like her half sister, became a bastard.

Henry immediately married Jane Seymour, who became pregnant almost as quickly. On 12 October 1537, she gave birth to a healthy boy, Edward, which was greeted with huge celebrations. However, the queen died of puerperal sepsis ten days later. Henry genuinely mourned her death, and at his own passing nine years later, he was buried next to her.

The king married a fourth time in 1540, to the German Anne of Cleves for a political alliance with her Protestant brother, the Duke of Cleves. He also hoped to obtain another son in case something should happen to Edward. Anne proved a dull, unattractive woman and Henry did not consummate the marriage. He quickly divorced her, and she remained in England as a kind of adopted sister to him. He married again, to a 19-year-old named Catherine Howard. But when it became known that she was neither a virgin at the wedding, nor a faithful wife afterwards, she ended up on the scaffold and the marriage declared invalid. His sixth and last marriage was to Catherine Parr, who was more his nursemaid than anything else, as his health was failing since his jousting accident in 1536.

In 1542, the king started a new campaign in France, but unlike in 1512, he only managed with great difficulty. He only conquered the city of Boulogne, which France retook in 1549. Scotland also declared war and at Solway Moss was again totally defeated.

Henry's paranoia and suspicion worsened in his last years. The number of executions during his 38-year reign numbered tens of thousands. His domestic policies had strengthened royal authority to the detriment of the aristocracy, and led to a safer realm, but his foreign policy adventures did not increase England's prestige abroad and wrecked royal finances and the national economy, and embittered the Irish. He died in January 1547 at age 55 and was succeeded by his son, Edward VI.

=== Edward VI and Mary I ===
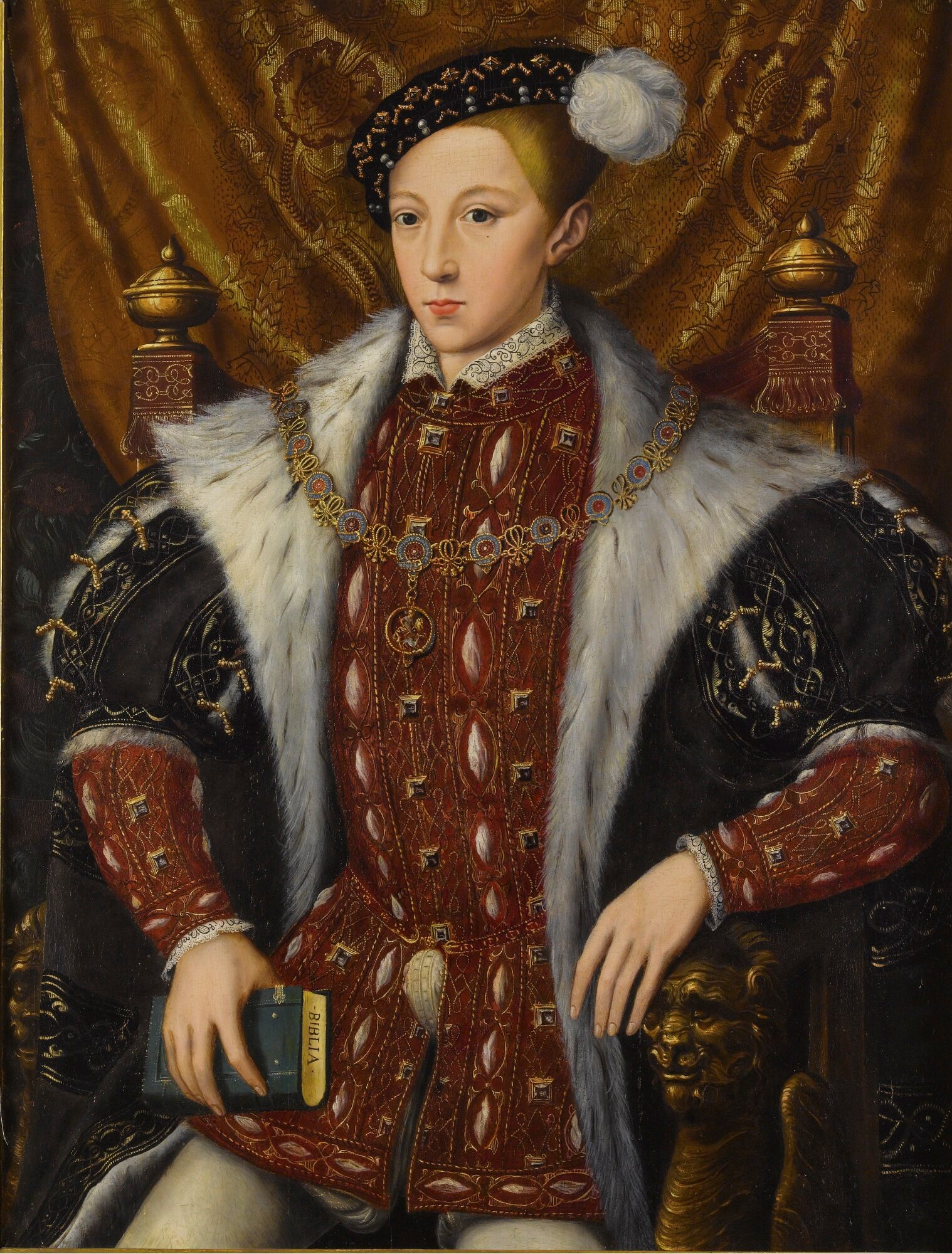
Portrait of Edward VI, c. 1550

Although he showed piety and intelligence, Edward VI was only nine years old when he became king in 1547. His uncle, Edward Seymour, 1st Duke of Somerset tampered with Henry VIII's will and obtained letters patent giving him much of the power of a monarch by March 1547. He took the title of Protector. While some see him as a high-minded idealist, his stay in power culminated in a crisis in 1549 when many counties of the realm were up in protest. Kett's Rebellion in Norfolk and the Prayer Book Rebellion in Devon and Cornwall simultaneously created a crisis while invasion from Scotland and France were feared. Somerset, disliked by the Regency Council for being autocratic, was removed from power by John Dudley, who is known as Lord President Northumberland. Northumberland proceeded to adopt the power for himself, but he was more conciliatory and the Council accepted him. During Edward's reign England changed from being a Catholic nation to a Protestant one, in schism from Rome.

Edward showed great promise but fell violently ill of tuberculosis in 1553 and died that August, at the age of 15 years, 8 months.

Northumberland made plans to place Lady Jane Grey on the throne and marry her to his son, so that he could remain the power behind the throne. His plot failed in a matter of days, Jane Grey was beheaded, and Mary I (1516–1558) took the throne amidst popular demonstration in her favour in London, which contemporaries described as the largest show of affection for a Tudor monarch. Mary had never been expected to hold the throne, at least not since Edward was born. She was a devoted Catholic who believed that she could reverse the Reformation.

Returning England to Catholicism led to the burnings of 274 Protestants, which are recorded especially in John Foxe's Book of Martyrs. Mary then married her cousin Philip, son of Emperor Charles V, and King of Spain when Charles abdicated in 1556. The union was difficult because Mary was already in her late 30s and Philip was a Catholic and a foreigner, and so not very welcome in England. This wedding also provoked hostility from France, already at war with Spain and now fearing being encircled by the Habsburgs. Calais, the last English outpost on the Continent, was then taken by France. King Philip (1527–1598) had very little power, although he did protect Elizabeth. He was not popular in England, and spent little time there. Mary eventually became pregnant, or at least believed herself to be. In reality, she may have had uterine cancer. Her death in November 1558 was greeted with huge celebrations in the streets of London.

=== Elizabeth I ===
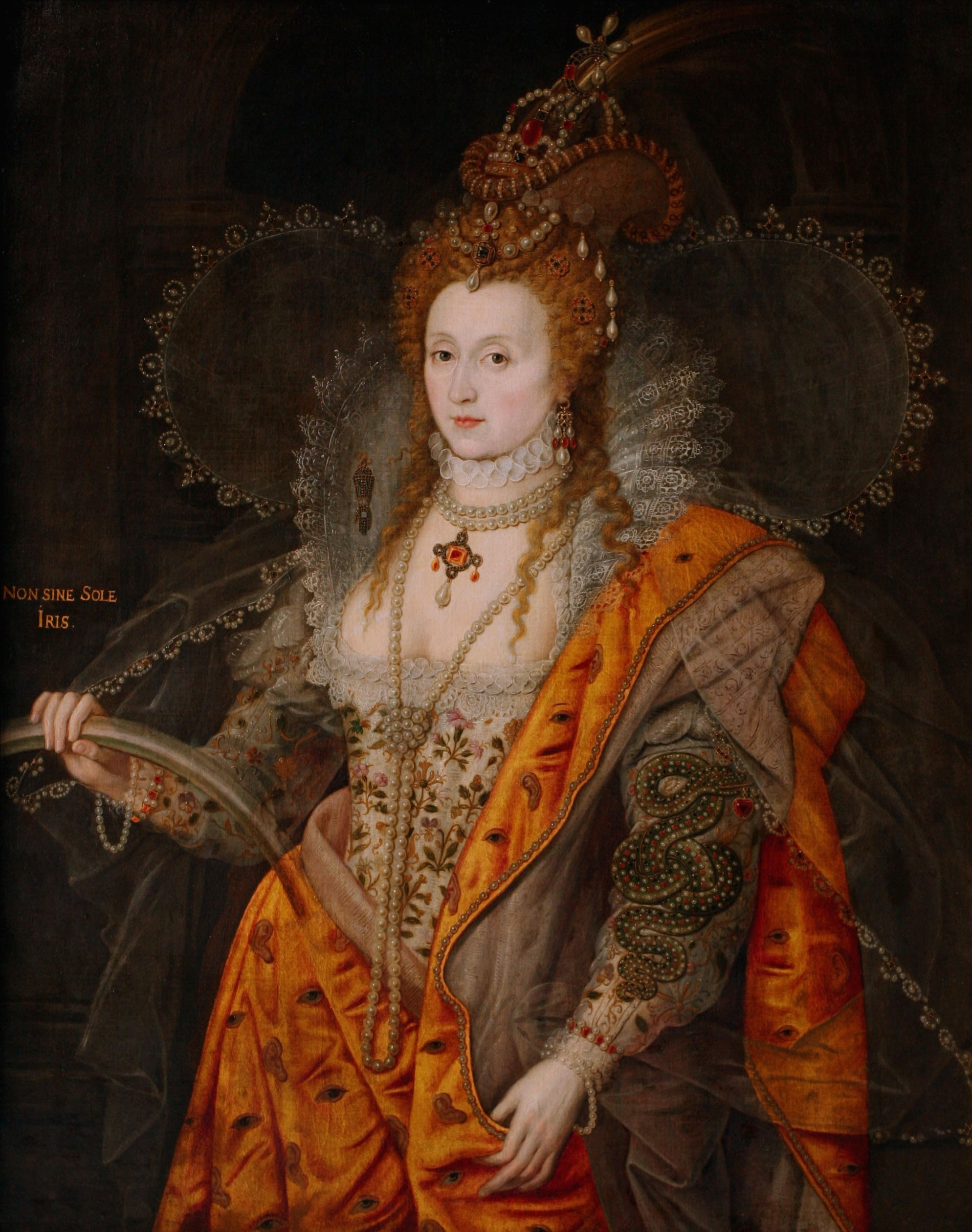
Elizabeth I

After Mary I died in 1558, Elizabeth I came to the throne. Her reign restored a sort of order to the realm after the turbulent reigns of Edward VI and Mary I. The religious issue which had divided the country since Henry VIII was in a way put to rest by the Elizabethan Religious Settlement, which re-established the Church of England. Much of Elizabeth's success was in balancing the interests of the Puritans and Catholics; historian Robert Bucholz paraphrasing historian Conrad Russell, suggested that the genius of the Church of England was that it "thinks Protestant but looks Catholic." She managed to offend neither to a large extent, although she clamped down on Catholics towards the end of her reign as war with Catholic Spain loomed.

Despite the need for an heir, Elizabeth declined to marry, despite offers from a number of suitors across Europe, including the Swedish king Erik XIV. This created endless worries over her succession, especially in the 1560s when she nearly died of smallpox. It has been often rumoured that she had a number of lovers (including Francis Drake), but there is no hard evidence.

Elizabeth maintained relative government stability. Apart from the Revolt of the Northern Earls in 1569, she was effective in reducing the power of the old nobility and expanding the power of her government. Elizabeth's government did much to consolidate the work begun under Thomas Cromwell in the reign of Henry VIII, that is, expanding the role of the government and effecting common law and administration throughout England. During the reign of Elizabeth and shortly afterwards, the population grew significantly: from three million in 1564 to nearly five million in 1616.

The queen ran afoul of her cousin Mary, Queen of Scots, who was a devoted Catholic and so was forced to abdicate her throne (Scotland had recently become Protestant). She fled to England, where Elizabeth immediately had her arrested. Mary spent the next 19 years in confinement, but proved too dangerous to keep alive, as the Catholic powers in Europe considered her the legitimate ruler of England. She was eventually tried for treason, sentenced to death, and beheaded in February 1587.

==== Elizabethan era ====
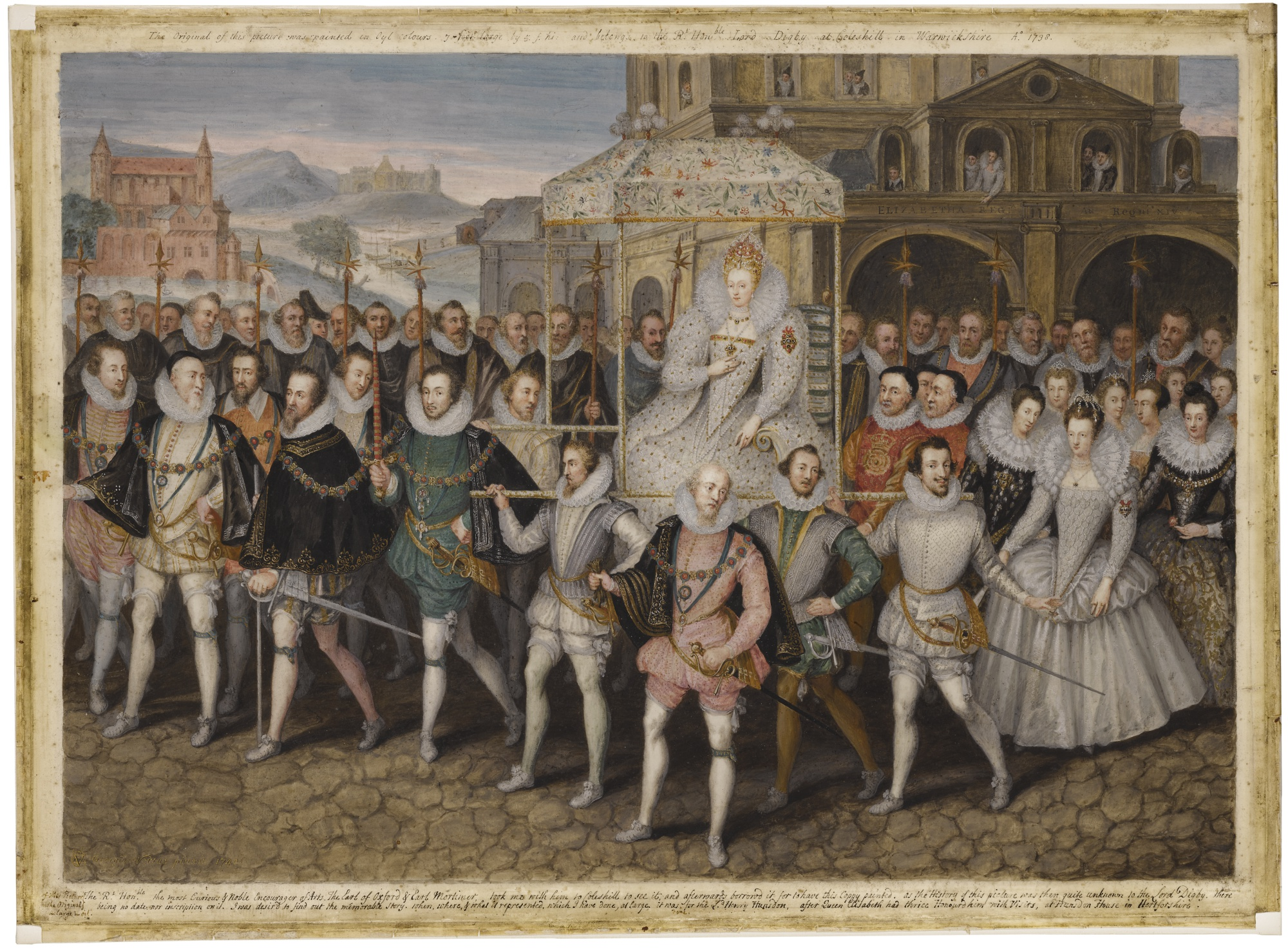
The Procession Picture, c. 1600, showing Elizabeth I borne along by her courtiers

The Elizabethan era was the epoch in English history of Queen Elizabeth I's reign (1558–1603). Historians often depict it as the golden age in English history. The symbol of Britannia was first used in 1572 and often thereafter to mark the Elizabethan age as a renaissance that inspired national pride through classical ideals, international expansion, and naval triumph over the hated Spanish foe. In terms of the entire century, the historian John Guy (1988) argues that "England was economically healthier, more expansive, and more optimistic under the Tudors" than at any time in a thousand years.

This "golden age" represented the apogee of the English Renaissance and saw the flowering of poetry, music and literature. The era is most famous for theatre, as William Shakespeare and many others composed plays that broke free of England's past style of theatre. It was an age of exploration and expansion abroad, while back at home, the Protestant Reformation became more acceptable to the people, most certainly after the Spanish Armada was repulsed. It was also the end of the period when England was a separate realm before its royal union with Scotland.

The Elizabethan Age is viewed so highly largely because of the periods before and after. It was a brief period of largely internal peace after the horrible violence and disorder of the Wars of the Roses, and battles between Catholics and Protestants during the English Reformation; and it preceded the violent turmoil of the English Civil War and battles between parliament and the monarchy during the 17th century. The Protestant/Catholic divide was settled, for a time, by the Elizabethan Religious Settlement, and parliament was not yet strong enough to challenge royal absolutism.

England was also well off compared to the other nations of Europe. The Italian Renaissance had ended due to foreign domination of the peninsula. France was embroiled in religious battles until the Edict of Nantes in 1598. Also, the English had been expelled from their last outposts on the continent. Due to these reasons, the centuries long conflict with France was largely suspended for most of Elizabeth's reign. England during this period had a centralised, organised and effective government, largely due to the reforms of Henry VII and Henry VIII. Economically, the country began to benefit greatly from the new era of trans-Atlantic trade.

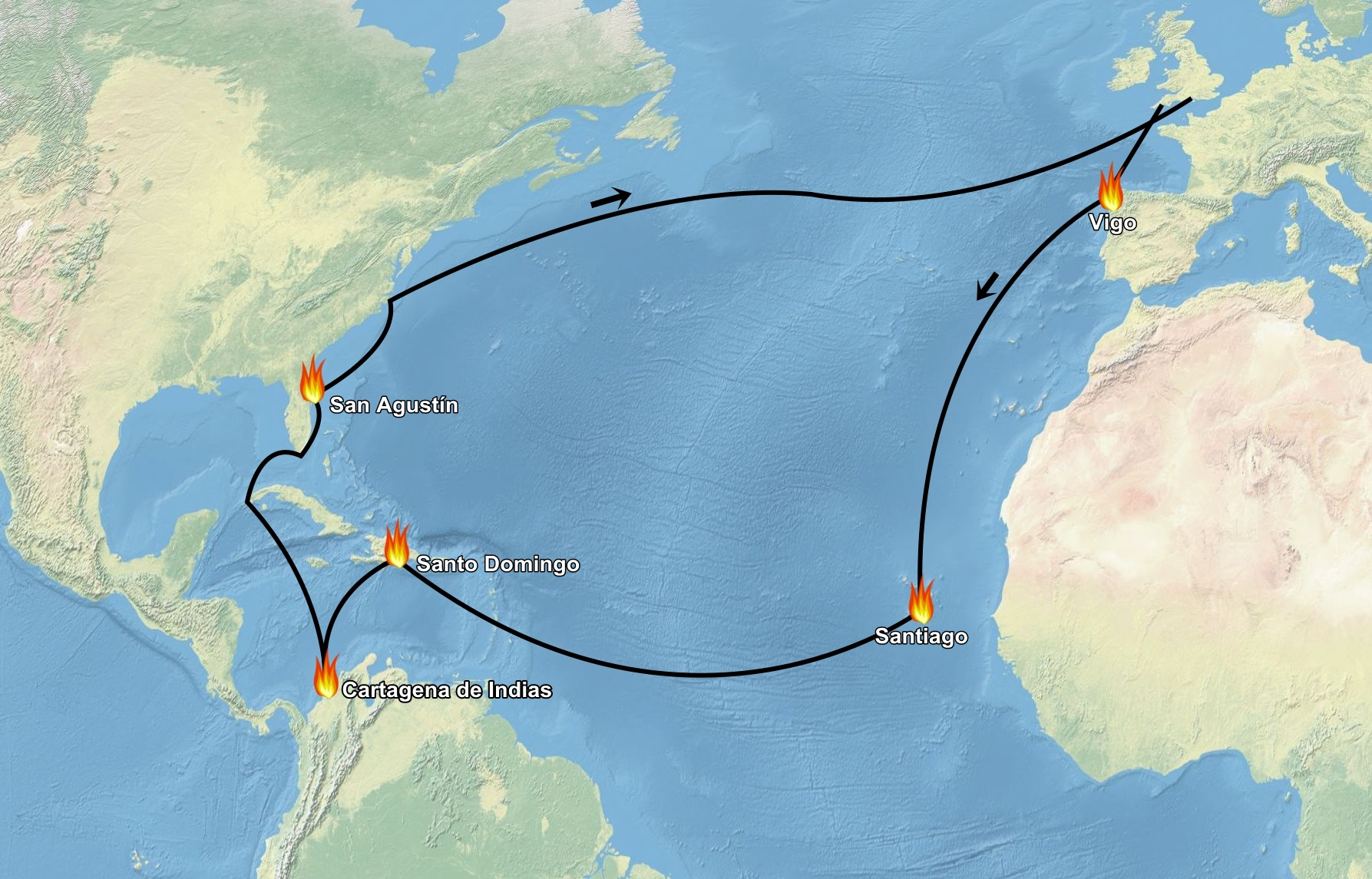
Sir Francis Drake's voyage 1585–86

In 1585 worsening relations between Philip II of Spain and Elizabeth erupted into war. Elizabeth signed the Treaty of Nonsuch with the Dutch and permitted Francis Drake to maraud in response to a Spanish embargo. Drake surprised Vigo, Spain, in October, then proceeded to the Caribbean and sacked Santo Domingo (the capital of Spain's American empire and the present-day capital of the Dominican Republic) and Cartagena (a large and wealthy port on the north coast of Colombia that was the centre of the silver trade). Philip II tried to invade England with the Spanish Armada in 1588 but was famously defeated.

The Armada was not just a naval campaign. The build-up of land forces to resist a Spanish invasion has been described as an administrative feat of massive scope. A survey taken in November and December 1587 showed 130,000 men in the militia, of whom 44,000 were members of the trained bands, being drilled and led by experienced captains and sergeants. By May 1588 the London bands were drilling weekly. To give warning of the enemy's approach, beacons were built, manned twenty-four hours a day by four men. Once the beacons were lit, 72,000 men could be mobilised on the south coast, with another 46,000 protecting London. For the many Englishmen caught up in the Armada the experience must have been very profound and frightening. Some shared the intimacy of beacon watching, hoping for the best, but ready to light their warning fires in case of the worst. Deloney, a London silkweaver, played on their fears in his "New Ballet [Ballad] on the strange whippes which the Spanyards had prepared to whippe English men" (1588). The political philosopher Thomas Hobbes recalled that his mother was so frightened that she prematurely gave birth to twins, of whom he was one. All were terrified about what might happen if the Spanish invaded. Stories of the Sack of Antwerp in 1576, in which the Spanish led by Sancho d'Avila raped, tortured and murdered as many as 17,000 civilians, were grist for playwrights and pamphleteers such as George Gascoigne and Shakespeare. The former remembered seeing civilians at Antwerp drowned, burned, or with guts hanging out as if they had been used for an anatomy lesson. Few Englishmen, women and children doubted they faced similar fates had the Armada landed.

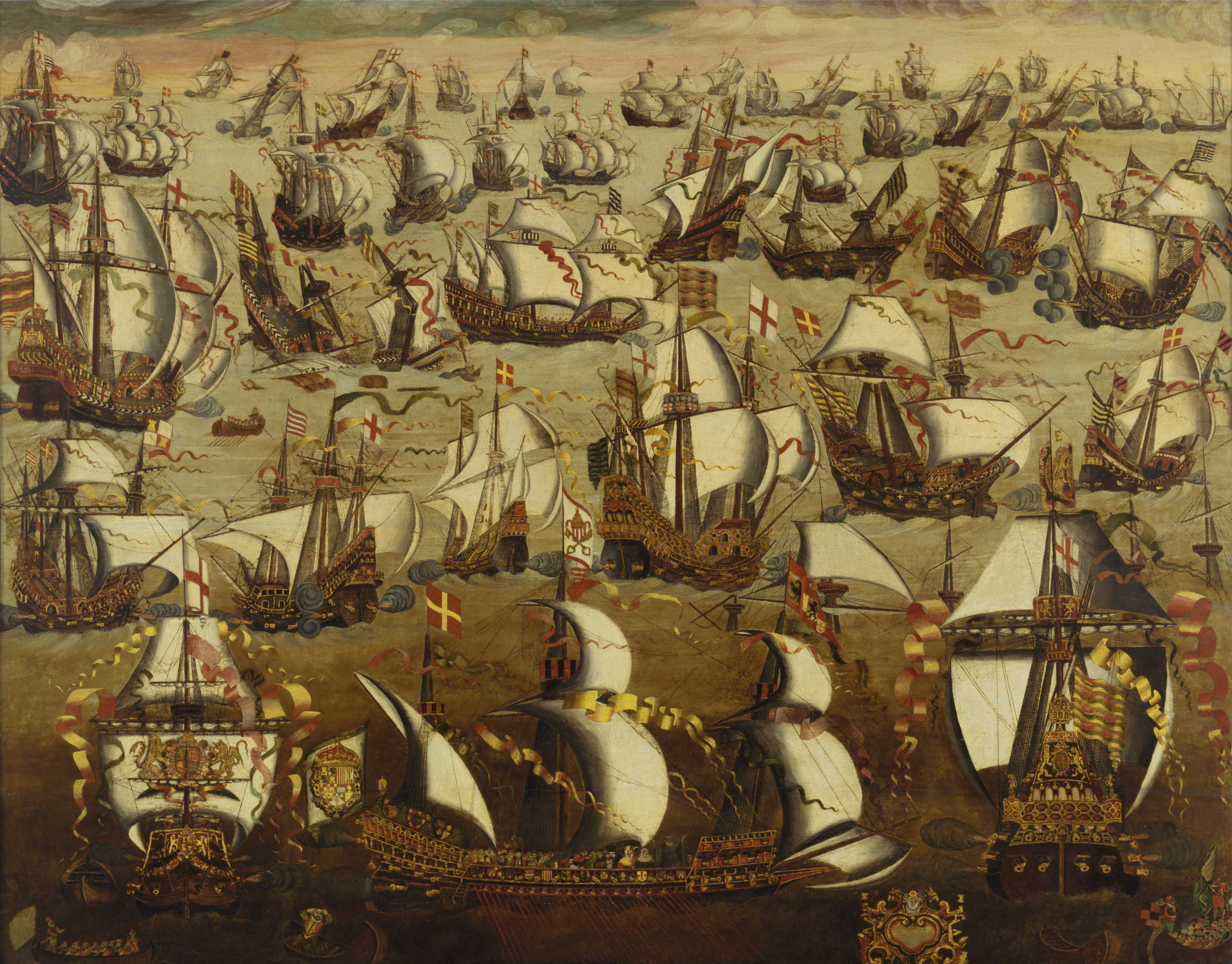
The Spanish Armada and English ships in August 1588, (unknown, 16th-century, English School)

==== Foreign affairs ====
In foreign policy, Elizabeth played against each other the major powers France and Spain, as well as the papacy and Scotland. These were all Catholic and each wanted to end Protestantism in England. Elizabeth was cautious in foreign affairs and only half-heartedly supported a number of ineffective, poorly resourced military campaigns in the Netherlands, France and Ireland. She risked war with Spain by supporting the "Sea Dogs", such as Walter Raleigh, John Hawkins and Sir Francis Drake, who preyed on Spanish merchant ships carrying gold and silver from the New World. Drake himself became a hero—being the first Englishman to circumnavigate the world between 1577 and 1580, having plundered Spanish settlements and treasure ships.

The major war came with Spain, 1585–1603. When Spain tried to invade and conquer England it was a fiasco, and the defeat of the Spanish Armada in 1588 associated Elizabeth's name with what is popularly viewed as one of the greatest victories in English history. Her enemies failed to combine and Elizabeth's foreign policy successfully navigated all the dangers. The following year, an English Armada, also known as the Counter Armada or the Drake–Norris Expedition, of a similar size to the Spanish one, was sent against Spain in order to drive home the advantage that England had gained. Led by Sir Francis Drake as admiral and Sir John Norris as general, it was however also a disaster. In 1596, England sent their second Armada to Cádiz, led by Charles Howard and the Earl of Essex the campaign was a signal victory. In revenge, Spain sent their second Spanish Armada to England a few months later, but this was met with disaster by storms before it saw England. Undeterred, a third Armada was sent the following year but near the English coast another storm dispersed the fleet, losing more ships sunk or captured.

The War ended with both sides seeking peace in order to stop the costly conflict with the Treaty of London in 1604, which validated the status quo ante bellum. It amounted to an acknowledgement by Spain that its hopes of restoring Roman Catholicism in England were at an end and it had to recognise the Protestant monarchy in England. In return, England ended its financial and military support for the Dutch rebellion, ongoing since the Treaty of Nonsuch (1585), and had to end its wartime disruption of Spanish trans-Atlantic shipping and colonial expansion.

In 1600, the East India Company was established with approval from Elizabeth I. The following year a small fleet led by James Lancaster sailed to the East Indies and broke into the Portuguese dominated Spice trade. They captured a rich and large Portuguese carrack, and established factories at Bantam on Java and in the Spice Islands before returning home. This was instrumental for the birth the British Empire.

=== End of Tudor era ===
In all, the Tudor period is seen as a decisive one which set up many important questions which would have to be answered in the next century and during the English Civil War. These were questions of the relative power of the monarch and Parliament and to what extent one should control the other. Some historians think that Thomas Cromwell affected a "Tudor Revolution" in government, and it is certain that Parliament became more important during his chancellorship. Other historians argue that the "Tudor Revolution" extended to the end of Elizabeth's reign, when the work was all consolidated. Although the Privy Council declined after Elizabeth's death, it was very effective while she was alive.

Elizabeth died in 1603 at the age of 69.

== 17th century ==
=== Union of the Crowns ===
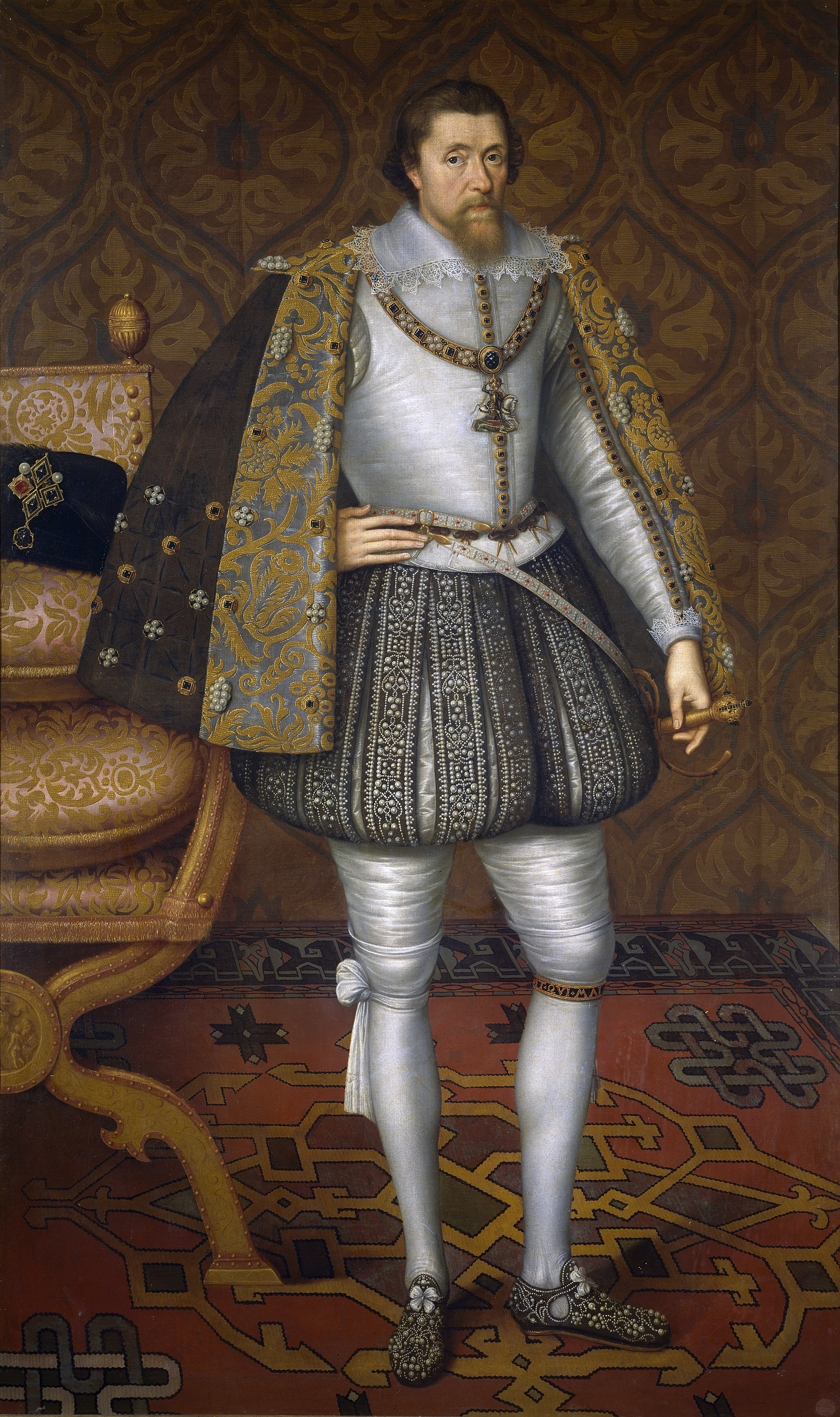
King James I of England

When Elizabeth died, her closest male Protestant relative was the King of Scots, James VI, of the House of Stuart, who became King James I of England in a Union of the Crowns, called James I and VI. He was the first monarch to rule the entire island of Britain, but the countries remained separate politically. Upon taking power, James made peace with Spain, and for the first half of the 17th century, England remained largely inactive in European politics. Several assassination attempts were made on James, notably the Main Plot and Bye Plots of 1603, and most famously, on 5 November 1605, the Gunpowder Plot, by a group of Catholic conspirators, led by Robert Catesby, which caused more antipathy in England towards Catholicism.

=== Colonies ===
In 1607 England built an establishment at Jamestown. This was the beginning of colonialism by England in North America. Many English settled then in North America for religious or economic reasons. Approximately 70% of English immigrants to North America who came between 1630 and 1660 were indentured servants. By 1700, Chesapeake planters transported about 100,000 indentured servants, who accounted for more than 75% of all European immigrants to Virginia and Maryland.

=== English Civil War ===
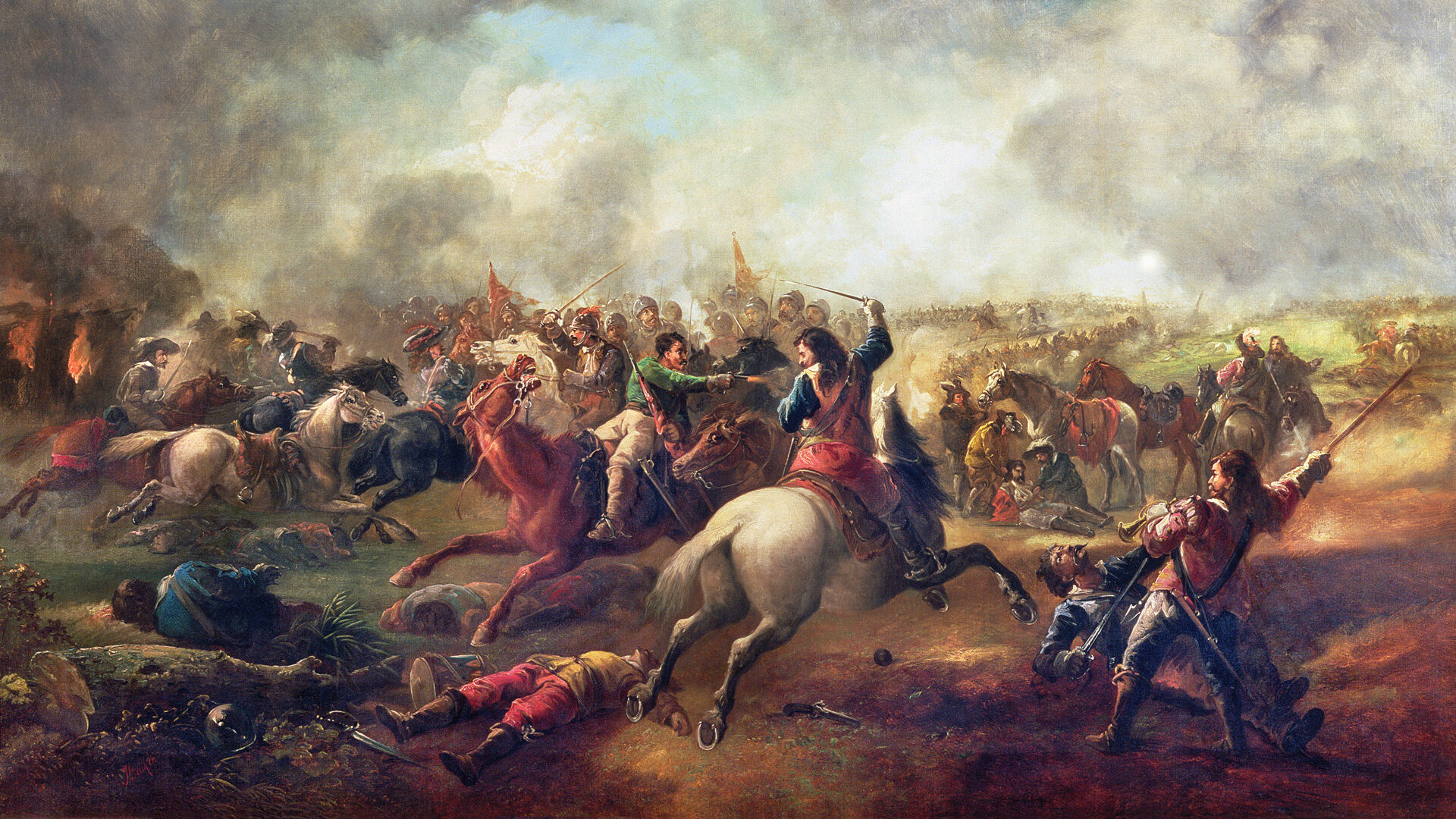
First English Civil War at the Battle of Marston Moor, 1644

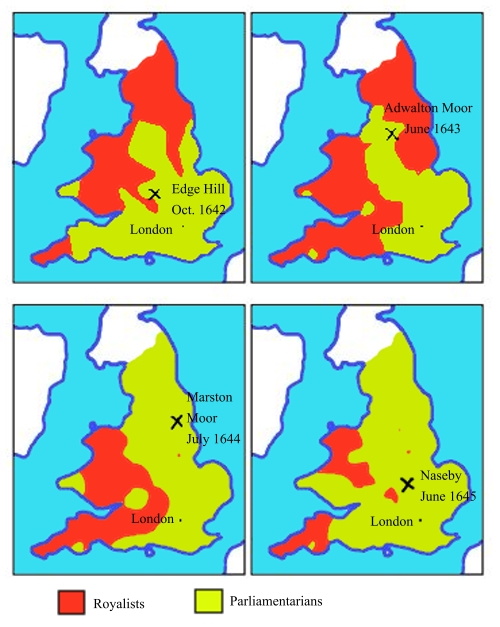
Maps of territory held by Royalists (red) and Parliamentarians (green) during the English Civil War (1642–1645)

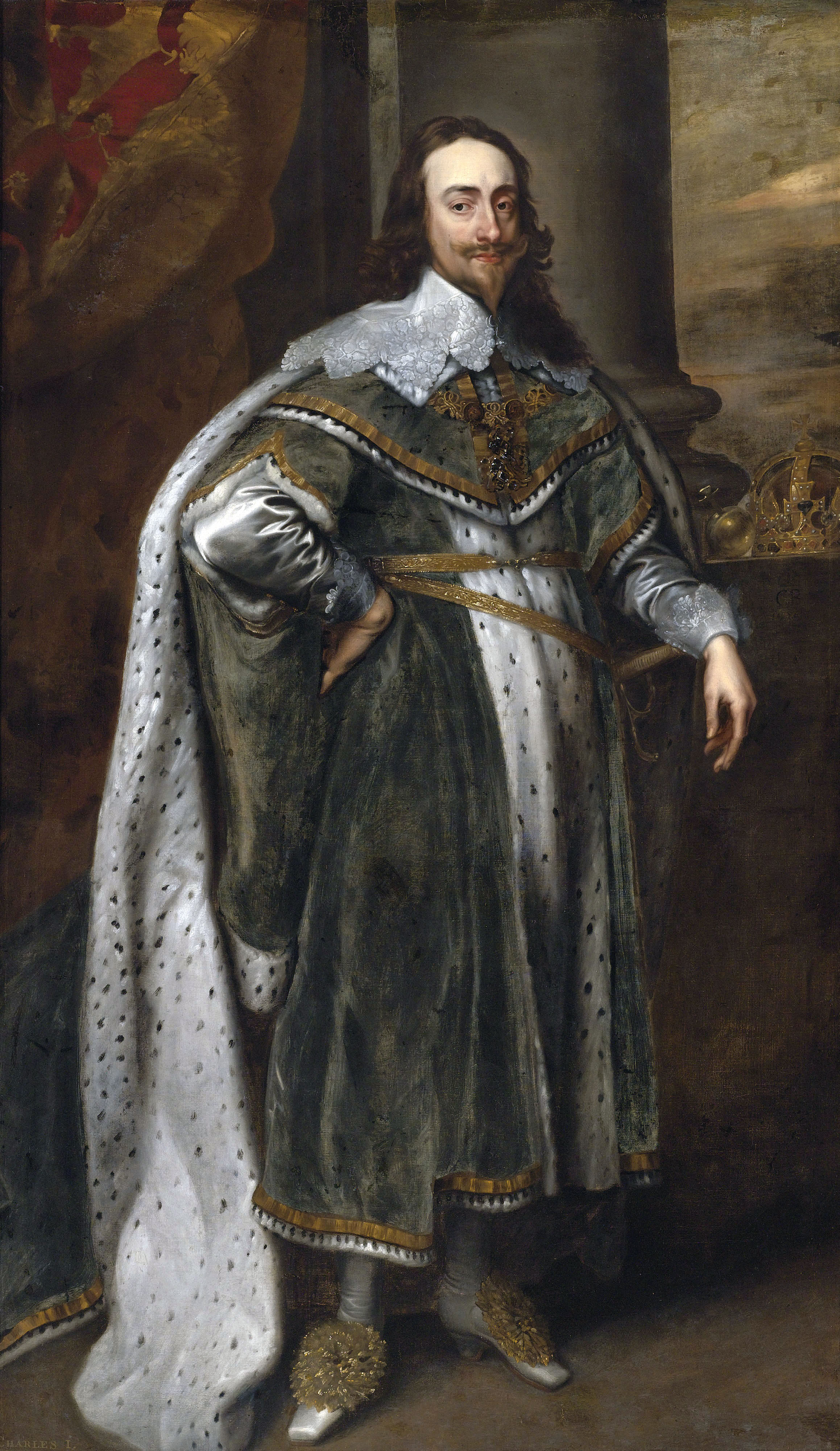
King Charles I, who was beheaded in 1649

The First English Civil War broke out in 1642, largely due to ongoing conflicts between James' son, Charles I, and Parliament. The defeat of the Royalist army by the New Model Army of Parliament at the Battle of Naseby in June 1645 effectively destroyed the king's forces. Charles surrendered to the Scottish army at Newark. He was eventually handed over to the English Parliament in early 1647. He escaped, and the Second English Civil War began, but the New Model Army quickly secured the country. The capture and trial of Charles led to the execution of Charles I in January 1649 at Whitehall Gate in London, making England a republic. This shocked the rest of Europe. The king argued to the end that only God could judge him.

The New Model Army, commanded by Oliver Cromwell, then scored decisive victories against Royalist armies in Ireland and Scotland. Cromwell was given the title Lord Protector in 1653, making him 'king in all but name' to his critics. After he died in 1658, his son Richard Cromwell succeeded him in the office but he was forced to abdicate within a year. For a while it seemed as if a new civil war would begin as the New Model Army split into factions. Troops stationed in Scotland under the command of George Monck eventually marched on London to restore order.

According to Derek Hirst, outside of politics and religion, the 1640s and 1650s saw a revived economy characterised by growth in manufacturing, the elaboration of financial and credit instruments, and the commercialisation of communication. The gentry found time for leisure activities, such as horse racing and bowling. In the high culture important innovations included the development of a mass market for music, increased scientific research, and an expansion of publishing. All the trends were discussed in depth at the newly established coffee houses.

=== Restoration of the monarchy ===
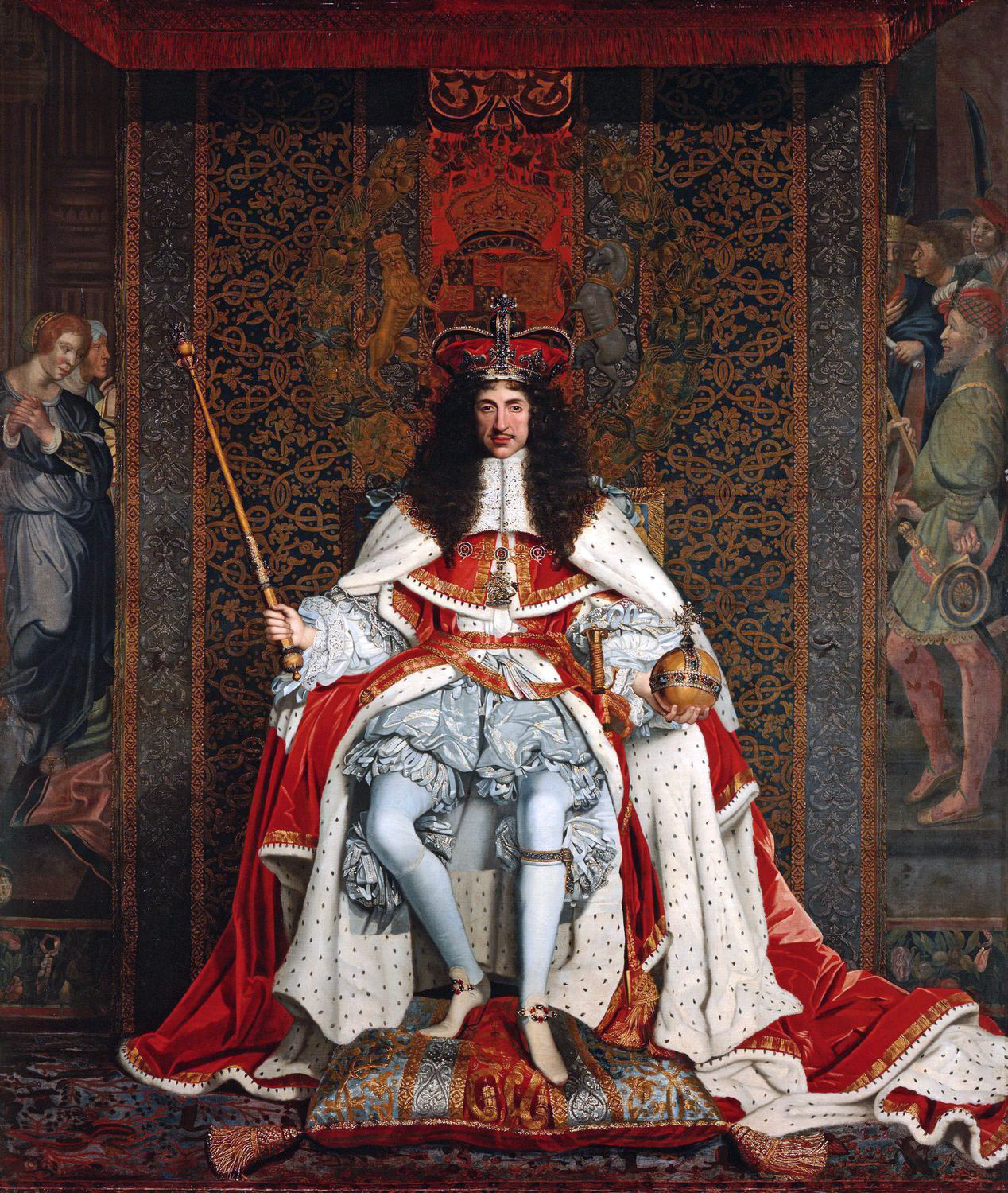
King Charles II

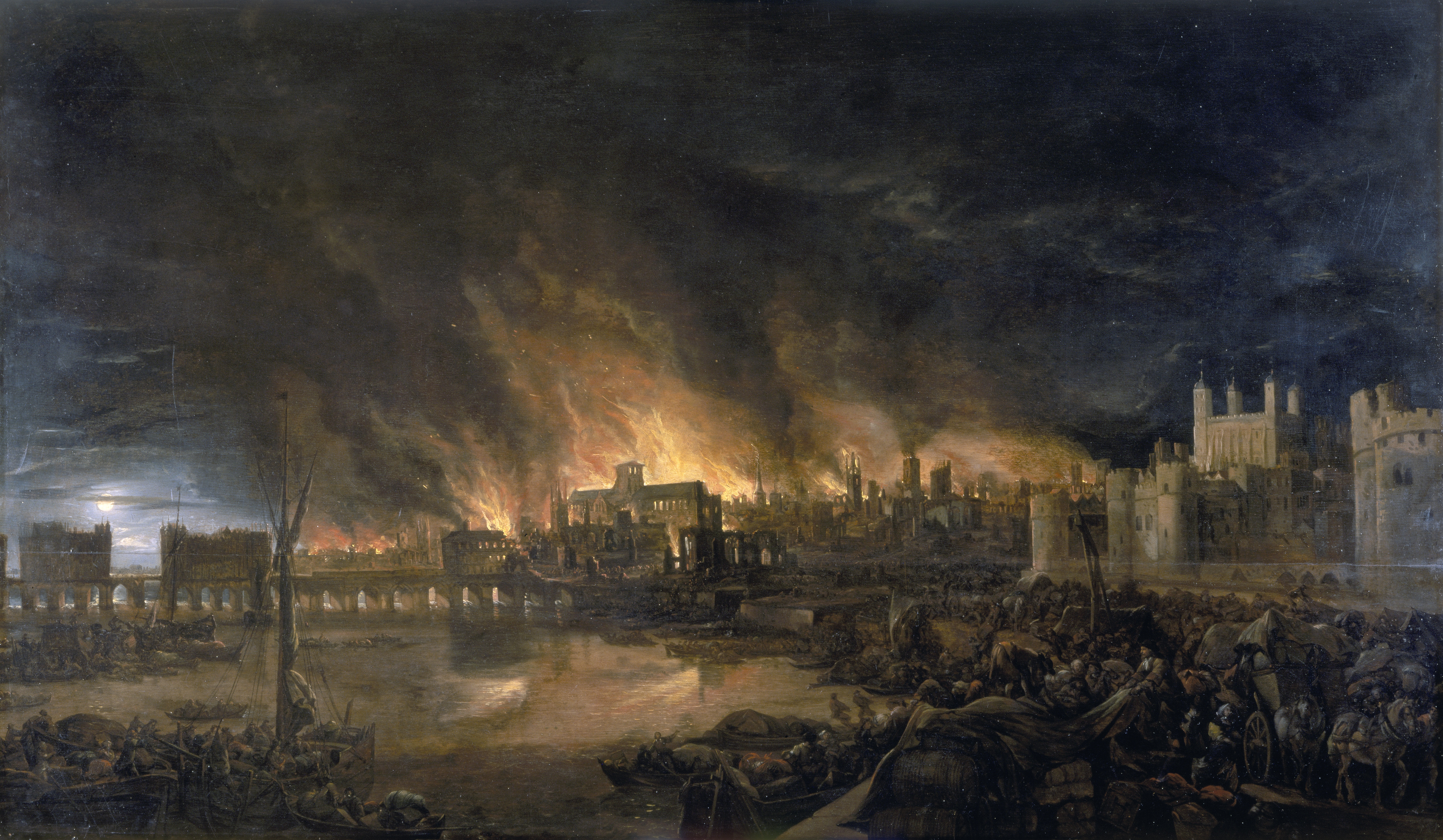
The Great Fire London, 1666.

The monarchy was restored in 1660, with King Charles II returning to London. However, the power of the crown was less than before the Civil War. By the 18th century, England rivaled the Netherlands as one of the freest countries in Europe.

In 1665, London was swept by the plague, and in 1666 by the Great Fire for 5 days which destroyed about 15,000 buildings.

=== Glorious Revolution ===
In 1680, the Exclusion Crisis consisted of attempts to prevent accession of James, heir to Charles II, because he was Catholic. After Charles II died in 1685 and his younger brother, James II and VII was crowned, various factions pressed for his Protestant daughter Mary and her husband Prince William III of Orange to replace him in what became known as the Glorious Revolution.

In November 1688, William invaded England and succeeded in being crowned. James tried to retake the throne in the Williamite War, but was defeated at the Battle of the Boyne in 1690.

In December 1689, one of the most important constitutional documents in English history, the Bill of Rights, was passed. The Bill, which restated and confirmed many provisions of the earlier Declaration of Right, established restrictions on the royal prerogative. For example, the Sovereign could not suspend laws passed by Parliament, levy taxes without parliamentary consent, infringe the right to petition, raise a standing army during peacetime without parliamentary consent, deny the right to bear arms to Protestant subjects, unduly interfere with parliamentary elections, punish members of either House of Parliament for anything said during debates, require excessive bail or inflict cruel and unusual punishments. William was opposed to such constraints, but chose to avoid conflict with Parliament and agreed to the statute.

In parts of Scotland and Ireland, Catholics loyal to James remained determined to see him restored to the throne, and staged a series of bloody uprisings. As a result, any failure to pledge loyalty to the victorious King William was severely dealt with. The most infamous example of this policy was the Massacre of Glencoe in 1692. Jacobite rebellions continued into the mid-18th century until the son of the last Catholic claimant to the throne, James III and VIII, mounted a final campaign in 1745. The Jacobite forces of Prince Charles Edward Stuart, the "Bonnie Prince Charlie" of legend, were defeated at the Battle of Culloden in 1746.

== Formation of Great Britain and the United Kingdom ==
The Acts of Union between the Kingdom of England and the Kingdom of Scotland were a pair of acts of parliament passed by both parliaments in 1707, which dissolved them in order to form a Kingdom of Great Britain governed by a unified Parliament of Great Britain according to the Treaty of Union. The acts joined the Kingdom of England and the Kingdom of Scotland (previously separate independent states, with separate legislatures but with the same monarch, starting with James I of England (also James VI of Scotland)) into a single kingdom.

The two countries had shared a monarch since the Union of the Crowns in 1603, when King James VI of Scotland inherited the English throne from his double first cousin twice removed, Queen Elizabeth I. Although described as a Union of Crowns, until 1707 there were in fact two separate Crowns resting on the same head. There had been three attempts in 1606, 1667, and 1689 to unite the two countries by acts of parliament, but it was not until the early 18th century that the idea had the will of both political establishments behind them, albeit for rather different reasons.

The Acts took effect on 1 May 1707. On this date, the English Parliament and the Scottish Parliament united to form the Parliament of Great Britain, based in the Palace of Westminster in London, the home of the English Parliament. Hence, the Acts are referred to as the Union of the Parliaments. On the Union, historian Simon Schama said "What began as a hostile merger, would end in a full partnership in the most powerful going concern in the world ... it was one of the most astonishing transformations in European history."

In 1714 ended the reign of Queen Anne, the last monarch of the House of Stuart. She was succeeded by her second cousin, George I, of the House of Hanover, who was a descendant of the Stuarts through his maternal grandmother, Elizabeth, daughter of James VI & I. A series of Jacobite rebellions broke out in an attempt to restore the Stuart monarchy, but failed. Several planned French invasions were attempted, also with the intention of placing the Stuarts on the throne.

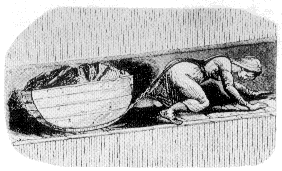
The first general laws against child labour, the Factory Acts, were passed in Britain in the first half of the 19th century. Children younger than nine were not allowed to work and the work day of youth under the age of 18 was limited to twelve hours.

The Act of Union of 1800 formally assimilated Ireland within the British political process and from 1 January 1801 created a new state called the United Kingdom of Great Britain and Ireland, which united Great Britain with the Kingdom of Ireland to form a single political entity. The English parliament at Westminster became the parliament of the Union.

== Modern England, 18th–19th centuries ==
Following the formation of Great Britain, the history of England is no longer the history of a sovereign nation, but rather the history of one of the countries of the United Kingdom.

=== Industrial Revolution ===
In the late 18th and early 19th centuries, technological advances and mechanisation resulted in the Industrial Revolution which transformed a largely agrarian society and caused considerable social upheaval. Economies of scale and increased output per worker allowed steam-based factories to undercut production of traditional cottage industries. Much of the agricultural workforce was uprooted from the countryside and moved into large urban centres of production. The consequent overcrowding into areas with little supporting infrastructure saw dramatic increases in mortality, crime, and social deprivation. (Many Sunday schools for pre-working-age children (5 or 6) had funeral clubs to pay for each other's funeral arrangements.) The process of industrialisation threatened many livelihoods, which prompted some to sabotage factories. These saboteurs were known as "Luddites".

=== Local governance ===
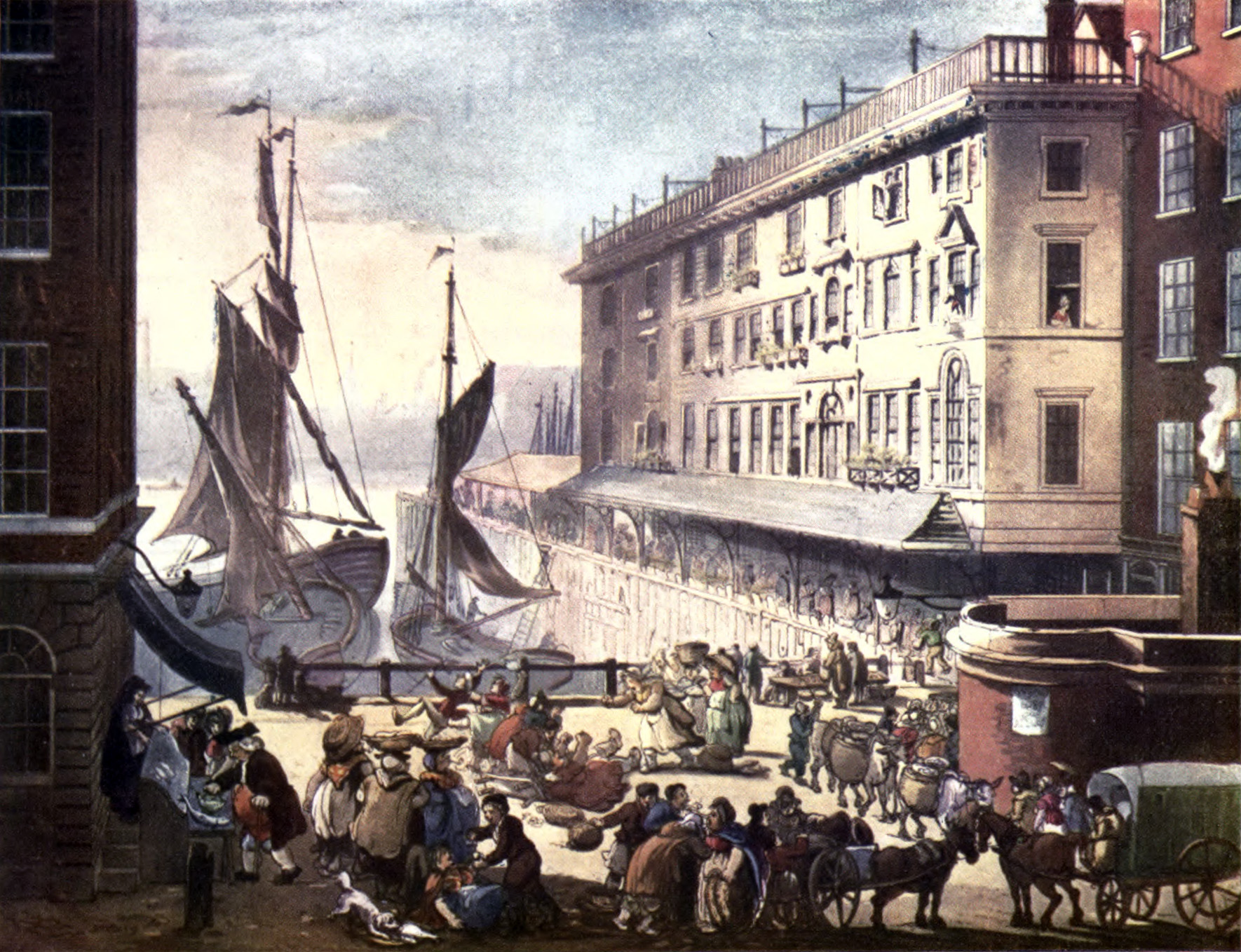
The Billingsgate Fish Market in London in the early 19th century

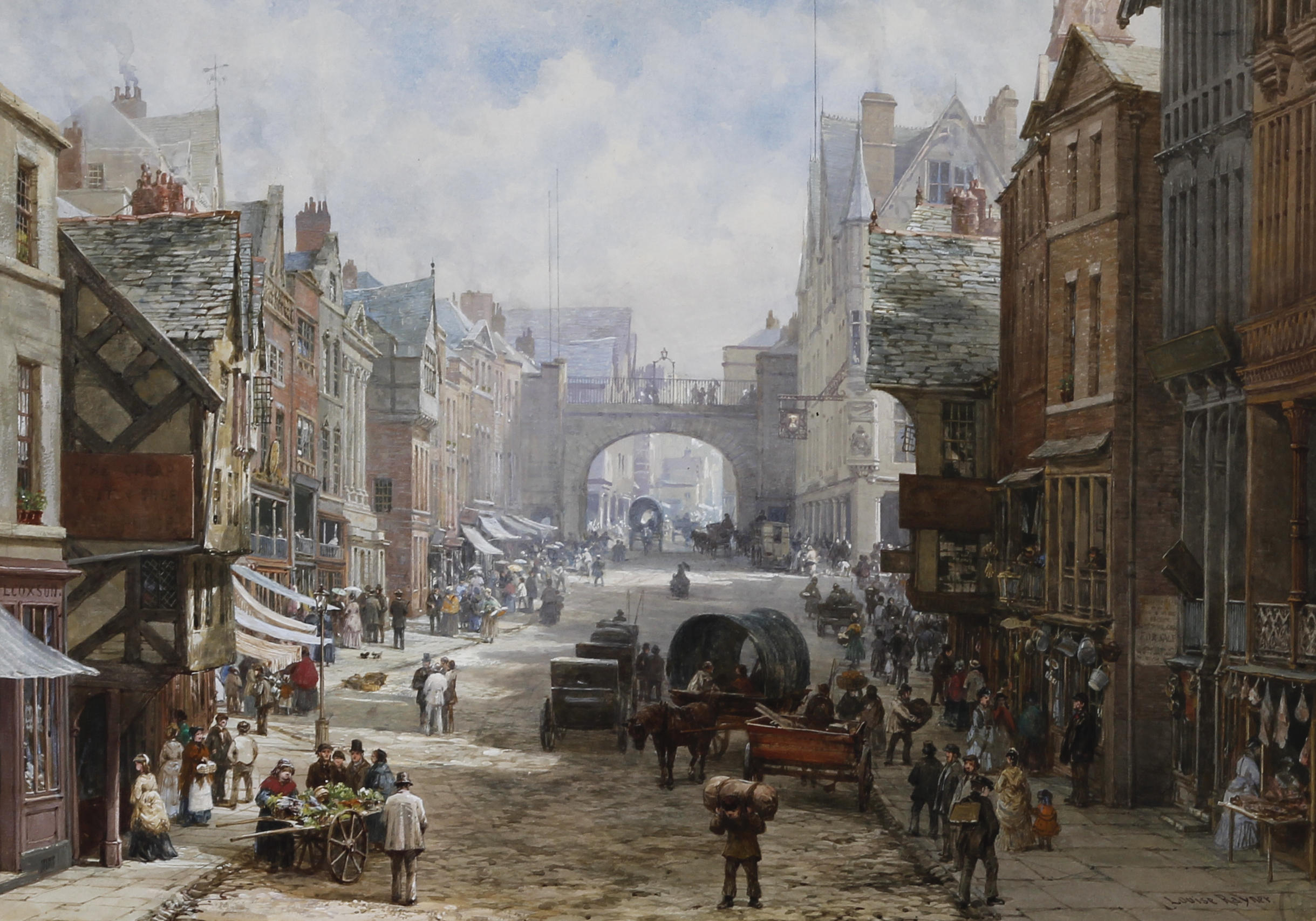
Chester, c. 1880

The Local Government Act 1888 was the first systematic attempt to impose a standardised system of local government in England. The system was based on the existing counties (today known as the historic counties, since the major boundary changes of 1974). Later, the Local Government Act 1894 created a second tier of local government. All administrative counties and county boroughs were divided into either rural or urban districts, allowing more localised administration.

During the 1800s, the need for local administration greatly increased, prompting piecemeal adjustments. The sanitary districts and parish councils had legal status, but were not part of the mechanism of government. They were run by volunteers; often no-one could be held responsible for the failure to undertake the required duties. Furthermore, the increased "county business" could not be handled by the quarter sessions, nor was this appropriate. Finally, there was a desire to see local administration performed by elected officials, as in the reformed municipal boroughs. By 1888, these shortcomings were clear, and the Local Government Act was the first systematic attempt to create a standardised system of local government in England.

The system was based on the existing counties (now known as the historic counties, since the major boundary changes of 1974). The counties themselves had had some boundary changes in the preceding 50 years, mainly to remove enclaves and exclaves. The act called for the creation of statutory counties, based on the ancient/historic counties, but completely corrected for enclaves and exclaves, and adjusted so that each settlement was completely within one county. These statutory counties were to be used for non-administrative functions: "sheriff, lieutenant, custos rotulorum, justices, militia, coroner, or other". With the advent of elected councils, the offices of lord lieutenant and sheriff became largely ceremonial.

The statutory counties formed the basis for the so-called 'administrative counties'. However, it was felt that large cities and primarily rural areas in the same county could not be well administered by the same body. Thus, 59 "counties in themselves", or 'county boroughs', were created to administer the urban centres of England. These were part of the statutory counties, but not part of the administrative counties.

In 1894, the Local Government Act created a second tier of local government. Henceforth, all administrative counties and county boroughs would be divided into either rural or urban districts, allowing more localised administration. The municipal boroughs reformed after 1835 were brought into this system as special cases of urban districts. The urban and rural districts were based on, and incorporated the sanitary districts which created in 1875 (with adjustments, so that districts did not overlap two counties).

The Act also provided for the establishment of civil parishes. The 1894 Act formed an official system of civil parishes, separated from the ecclesiastical parishes, to carry on some of these responsibilities (others being transferred to the district/county councils). However, the civil parishes were not a complete third tier of local government. Instead, they were 'community councils' for smaller, rural settlements, which did not have a local government district to themselves. Where urban parish councils had previously existed, they were absorbed into the new urban districts.

== 20th and 21st centuries ==
A prolonged agricultural depression in Britain at the end of the 19th century, together with the introduction in the 20th century of increasingly heavy levels of taxation on inherited wealth, put an end to agricultural land as the primary source of wealth for the upper classes. Many estates were sold or broken up, and this trend was accelerated by the introduction of protection for agricultural tenancies, encouraging outright sales, from the mid-20th century.

=== General history and political issues ===
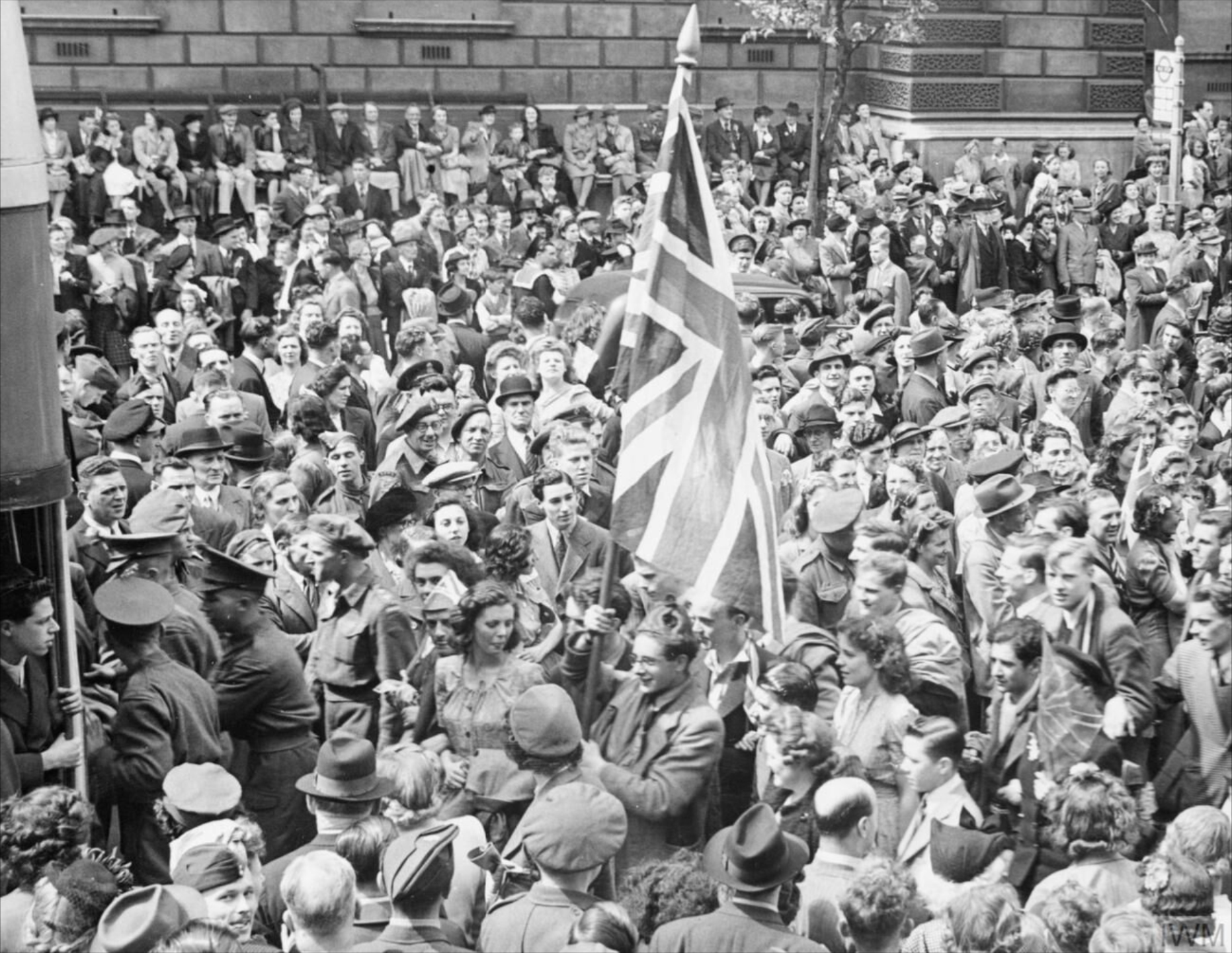
Victory in Europe Day celebrations in London, 8 May 1945

Following years of political and military agitation for 'Home Rule' for Ireland, the Anglo-Irish treaty of 1921 established the Irish Free State (now the Republic of Ireland) as a separate state, leaving Northern Ireland as part of the United Kingdom. The country's official name thus became "The United Kingdom of Great Britain and Northern Ireland".

England, as part of the UK, joined the European Economic Community in 1973, which became the European Union in 1993. The UK left the EU in 2020.

There is a movement in England to create a devolved English Parliament. This would give England a local Parliament like those already functioning for Scotland, Northern Ireland and Wales. This issue is referred to as the West Lothian question.

=== Political history and local government ===
A Local Government Commission was wound up in 1966, and replaced with a Royal Commission (known as the Redcliffe-Maud commission). In 1969 it recommended a system of single-tier unitary authorities for the whole of England, apart from three metropolitan areas of Merseyside, Selnec (Greater Manchester) and West Midlands (Birmingham and the Black Country), which were to have both a metropolitan council and district councils. This report was accepted by the Labour Party government of the time despite considerable opposition, but the Conservative Party won the June 1970 general election, and on a manifesto that committed them to a two-tier structure.

The reforms arising from the Local Government Act 1972 resulted in the most uniform and simplified system of local government which has been used in England. They effectively wiped away everything that had gone before, and built an administrative system from scratch. All previous administrative districts—statutory counties, administrative counties, county boroughs, municipal boroughs, counties corporate, civil parishes—were abolished.

The aim of the act was to establish a uniform two tier system across the country. Onto the blank canvas, new counties were created to cover the entire country; many of these were obviously based on the historic counties, but there were some major changes, especially in the north.

This uniform two-tier system lasted only 12 years. In 1986, the metropolitan county councils and Greater London were abolished. This restored autonomy (in effect the old county borough status) to the metropolitan and London boroughs. The Local Government Act (1992) established a commission (Local Government Commission for England) to examine the issues, and make recommendations on where unitary authorities should be established. It was considered too expensive to make the system entirely unitary, and also there would doubtlessly be cases where the two-tier system functioned well. The commission recommended that many counties be moved to completely unitary systems; that some cities become unitary authorities, but that the remainder of their parent counties remain two-tier; and that in some counties the status quo should remain.

The rate-capping rebellion was a campaign within English local councils in 1985 which aimed to force the Conservative government of Margaret Thatcher to withdraw powers to restrict the spending of councils. The campaign's tactic was that councils whose budgets were restricted would refuse to set any budget at all for the financial year 1985–86, requiring the Government to intervene directly in providing local services, or to concede. However, all 15 councils which initially refused to set a rate eventually did so, and the campaign failed to change Government policy. Powers to restrict council budgets have remained in place ever since.

In 1997, the Lieutenancies Act was passed. This firmly separated all local authority areas (whether unitary or two-tier), from the geographical concept of a county as high level spatial unit. The lieutenancies it established became known as ceremonial counties, since they were no longer administrative divisions. The counties represent a compromise between the historic counties and the counties established in 1974.

While the 1997 Labour government devolved power to Wales, Scotland and Northern Ireland, it refused to create a devolved Assembly or parliament for England, planning instead to introduce eight regional assemblies around England to devolve power to the regions. In the event, only a London Assembly (and directly elected Mayor) was established. Rejection in a referendum of a proposed North-East Assembly in 2004 effectively scrapped those plans. A pre-condition of having a regional assembly was for the whole area to move to unitary authority status. Since the 2005 general election the government has floated the idea of voluntary mergers of local councils, avoiding a costly reorganisation but achieving desired reform. For instance, the guiding principles of the government's "New Localism" demand levels of efficiency not present in the current over-duplicated two-tier structure.

=== Recent changes ===
In 2009, new changes to local government were made whereby a number of new unitary authorities were created in areas which previously had a 'two-tier' system of counties and districts. In five shire counties the functions of the county and district councils were combined into a single authority; and in two counties the powers of the county council were absorbed into a significantly reduced number of districts.

The abolition of regional development agencies and the creation of local enterprise partnerships were announced as part of the June 2010 United Kingdom budget. On 29 June 2010 a letter was sent from the Department of Communities and Local Government and the Department for Business, Innovation and Skills to local authority and business leaders, inviting proposals to replace regional development agencies in their areas by 6 September 2010.

On 7 September 2010, details were released of 56 proposals for local enterprise partnerships that had been received. On 6 October 2010, during the Conservative Party Conference, it was revealed that 22 had been given the provisional 'green light' to proceed and others may later be accepted with amendments. Twenty-four bids were announced as successful on 28 October 2010.

== See also ==
- Parliament of England
- Parliament of the United Kingdom
- Monarchs of England
  - English monarchs family tree
- Prime Minister of the United Kingdom
- List of rulers of the United Kingdom and predecessor states

=== Related historical overviews ===
- Bretwalda
- Commonwealth of Nations
- Danelaw
- History of the foreign relations of the United Kingdom
- History of the British constitution
- History of the British Isles
- History of the United Kingdom
- History of Scotland
- History of Ireland
- History of Wales
- Kingdom of Great Britain
- Politics of the United Kingdom
- Administrative geography of the United Kingdom
- List of articles about local government in the United Kingdom
- Nomenclature of Territorial Units for Statistics

=== Historical lists and timelines ===
- List of British monarchs, British monarchs' family tree
- Timeline of English history
- Timeline of British diplomatic history
- Historical and alternative regions of England

=== Overviews of significant historical eras ===
- House of Plantagenet
- House of Lancaster
- House of York

Note: Be sure to check the box in the upper right corner of this entry, providing a list of all notable eras within the history of England.

=== Related English history topics ===
==== Societal overviews ====
- English people
- Population of England – historical estimates
- Culture of England
- Politics of England
- Social history of England

==== Local government ====
- History of local government in England
- 2009 structural changes to local government in England
- Regions of England
- Subdivisions of England
- Unitary authorities of England

==== Historical subtopics ====
- History of education in England
- History of the Jews in England
- Military history of England
- English nationalism
- Anglo-Saxon England

== Sources ==
- Maier, Christoph T. (2022), "Crusaders and Jews: The York Massacre of 1190 Revisited", in Church, Stephen D. (ed.), Anglo-Norman Studies XLIV: Proceedings of the Battle Conference 2021, Boydell & Brewer, pp. 105–120, ISBN 978-1-80010-631-4
- Roth, Cecil (1964). A history of the Jews in England (Second ed.). Oxford: Clarendon Press. ISBN 978-0-19-822488-4.
