= Thomas Gates (governor) =

16th/17th-century Governor of Jamestown, in the English colony of Virginia

Sir Thomas Gates
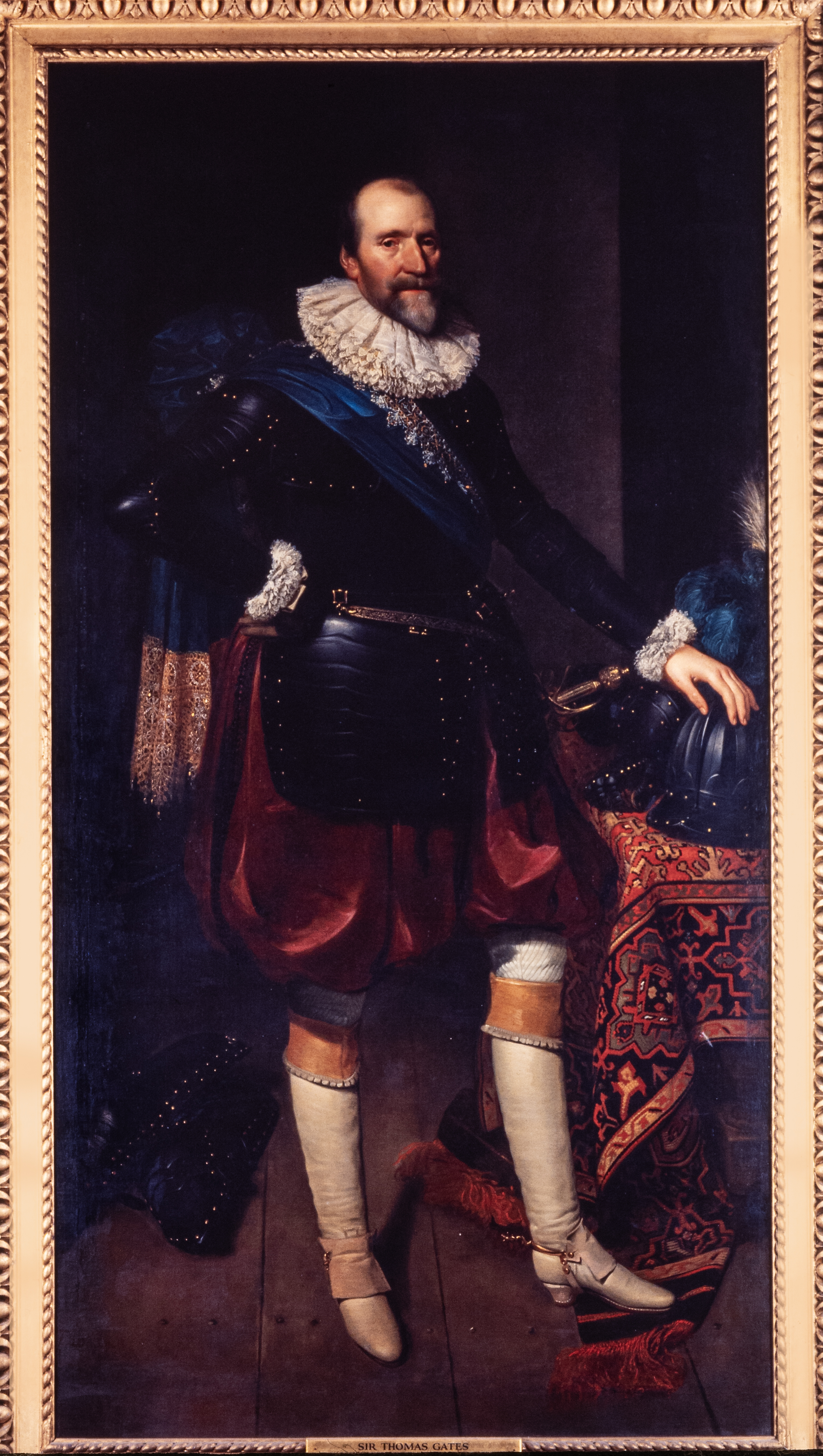
- Painting of Sir Thomas Gates (from Barbados Archives at The Bermuda National Trust, Globe Museum)
- Born: Thomas Cate fl. 1570s Devon, England
- Died: 1622; Netherlands
- Other name: Thomas Cates
- Known for: Colonial governor of Virginia

Sir Thomas Gates (d. 1622) was the governor of Jamestown in the English Colony of Virginia. First adventuring as a young a soldier with Robert Devereux, 2nd Earl of Essex, Francis Drake, and Walter Raleigh during the Anglo-Spanish War (1585–1604), he ascended to the court of James VI and I and was appointed in 1609 to govern Virginia. Enroute to Jamestown, Gates's flagship the Sea Venture became damaged by a storm and shipwrecked on the Bermuda archipelago. The castaways constructed two pinnaces and arrived at Jamestown 10 months later, to find the settlement in a dire situation. Gates ruled with deputy governor Sir Thomas Dale between 1610 and 1614. Their controlled, strict methods were credited with saving the English settlement. Gates would return to England, joined the Council for New England, and later settled in the Netherlands, where he spent the rest of his life.

== Before Virginia ==
Thomas Gates was born in Devonshire, England. His exact date of birth and parents are unknown. In adulthood, he was a soldier in the company of Christopher Carleill. In 1585, Gates was part of the armada with Carleill and Francis Drake, participating in Francis Drake's descent on Vigo, the Capture of Santiago (1585), the Battle of Santo Domingo (1586), the Battle of Cartagena de Indias (1586), and the Raid on St. Augustine (1586). With Drake and Carleill, Gates also visited Roanoke Colony, evacuating Ralph Lane and the colonists.

Thomas Gates accompanied Robert Devereux, 2nd Earl of Essex in his army supporting Henry IV of France in the Siege of Rouen (1591–1592). In 1596, he joined the Earl's and Walter Raleigh's Capture of Cádiz, when he received a knighthood among 60 other men. Thomas Smythe was also part of the raid. He also joined the same leaders on the Islands Voyage.

== Third Supply and Bermuda ==
Gates was appointed by the Virginia Company of London, which had established the Jamestown settlement under a Royal Charter for the colonisation of Virginia. He had sailed for Jamestown in 1609, aboard the Sea Venture, the flagship of the Virginia Company. The Sea Venture was part of the Third Supply, a fleet of seven ships, towing two pinnaces, which was intended to deliver new leadership, settlers, and desperately needed supplies.

At sea, the ships of the Third Supply were separated by a three-day tropical storm. The Admiral of the Virginia Company, Sir George Somers, had taken the helm to fight the storm, and drove the sinking ship onto rocks to prevent its foundering. The rocks proved to be the reef line to the east of an uninhabited archipelago: Bermuda. Other ships in the flotilla went on to Jamestown, not knowing the fate of the Sea Venture.

The 150 survivors spent the next ten months in Bermuda building two new ships on which to complete the journey to Jamestown. Two factions developed, however, due to a dispute between Gates and Somers over who was now the superior. As an appointed officer for Jamestown, Gates felt he was in authority, now that they were ashore. Somers felt that he retained authority until the settlers, including Gates, were landed at Jamestown. The two new ships, the Deliverance and the Patience were completed and sailed for Virginia in 1610. They left two men (a third would be left when the Patience returned from Jamestown) to maintain their claim of Bermuda for England. The Charter of the Virginia Company would officially be extended to include Bermuda in 1612.

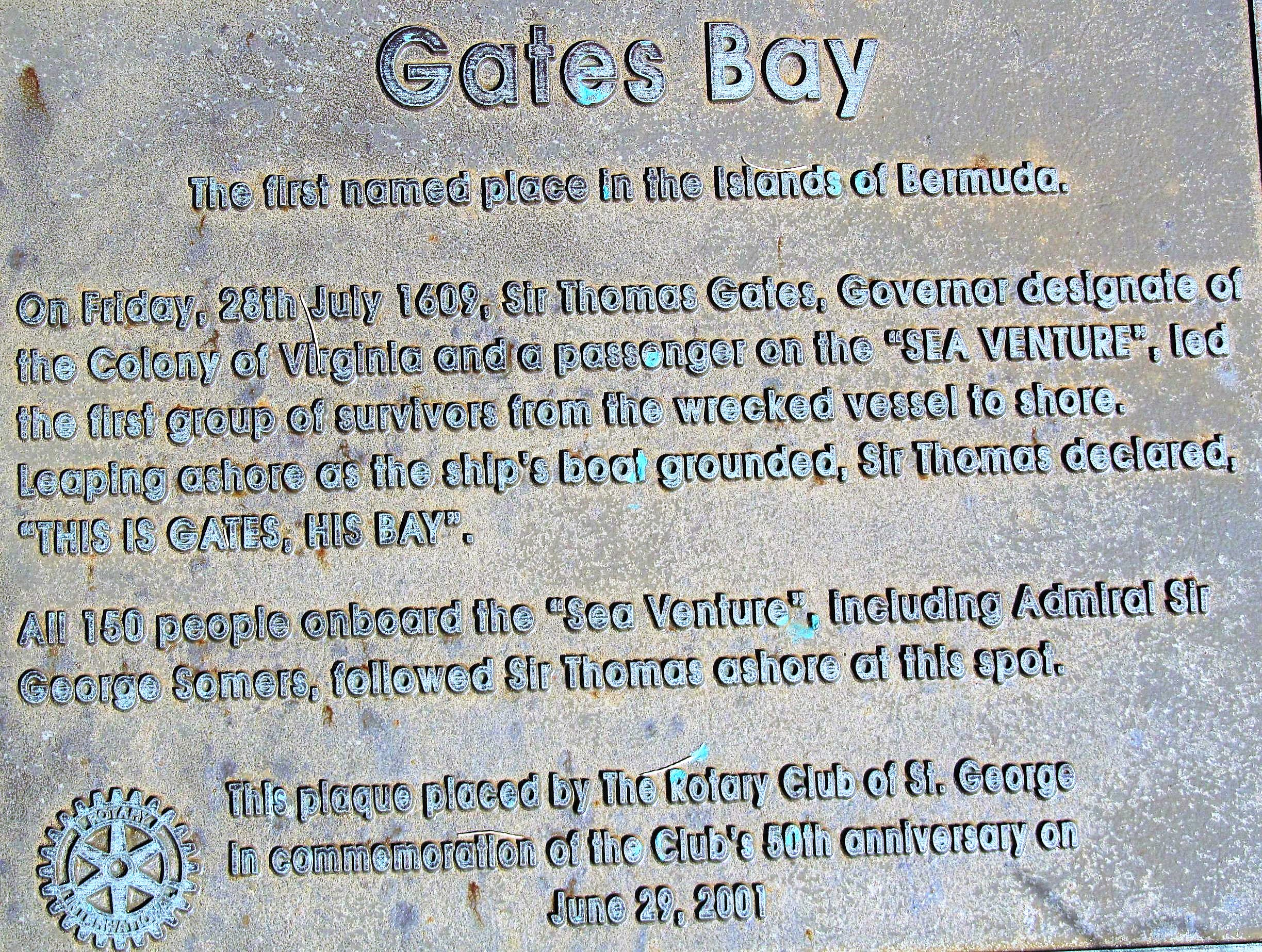
Plaque at Gates Bay, St. George's Island, Bermuda, provided by Rotary Club in 2001

Ever since, Bermuda has also been known officially as The Somers Isles. Sir Thomas Gates left his own name on a part of the colony, "Gates Bay", where the survivors of the Sea Venture landed. The oldest surviving fort in Bermuda, built between 1612 and 1615, is known as Gates' Fort. Many scholars believe Gates' accounts inspired William Shakespeare's play The Tempest. Sir Thomas Gates had a cross erected before leaving Bermuda, on which was a copper tablet inscribed in Latin and English:

In Memory of our deliverance both from the Storme and the Great leake wee have erected this cross to the honour of God. It is the Spoyle of an English Shippe of 300 tonnes called SEA VENTURE bound with seven others (from which the storme divided us) to Virginia or NOVA BRITANIA in America. In it were two Knights, Sir Thomas Gates, Knight Governor of the English Forces and Colonie there: and Sir George Somers, Knight Admiral of the Seas. Her Captain was Christopher Newport. Passengers and mariners she had beside (which all come to safety) one hundred and fiftie. Wee were forced to runne her ashore(by reason of her leake) under a point that bore South East from the Northerne Point of the Island which wee discovered first on the eighth and twentieth of July 1608.

== Virginia colony ==
Coat of Arms of Thomas Gates

On reaching Jamestown, only 60 of the 500 settlers previously landed there were found alive through the winter of 1609–1610 which became known as the "Starving Time". The condition of the settlement was so poor that on June 7, 1610, Gates decided to abandon the floundering settlement and return to England. However, the timely arrival of another relief fleet under Lord De La Warr gave the colony a reprieve. Gates' actions as governor were recorded by his secretary William Strachey, and were later published as the book A True Reportory of the wracke, and redemption of Sir THOMAS GATES, Knight.

After Samuel Argall kidnapped Pocahontas in April 1613, Gates was fearful of reprisal from Chief Powhatan, and turned the Algonquian princess over to Dale in Henricus. She met John Rolfe during her captivity three months later. Reverend Alexander Whitaker converted Pocahontas to Christianity. She adopted the name "Rebecca".

Gates would go on to establish at least three new forts along the James River, as well as blockhouses, a wharf, and a governors house. Gates would also lead an armed force against the Powhatans, defeating them, and was governor when Sir Thomas Dale established the first permanent English colony outside of Jamestown, called Henricus. Gates' actions caused him to be considered a national hero upon his return to England, something the Virginia Company badly needed due to their previous dip in investors. Gates was outspoken in support of future expeditions to the New World, and warned his superiors that the colonies would fail without proper supplies. In November 1619, the Virginia Company's new treasurer, Sir Edwin Sandys, praised Gates' "Wisdom, industry, and valour, accompanied with exceeding paines and patience, in the midst of many difficulties."

== Death ==
Gates died in the Netherlands in 1622. Sir Dudley Carleton was quoted, saying that Gates was "an ancient honest gentleman of this nation." Gates had five children at his death, Thomas, Anthony, Margaret, Mary, and Elizabeth.

Government offices
Preceded by George Percy	Colonial governor of Virginia; 1610	Succeeded by Baron De La Warr
Preceded by Thomas Dale	Colonial governor of Virginia; 1611–1614	Succeeded by Thomas Dale
