= John Marchant (seaman) =

- Born: c. 1540
- Died: 2 January 1596; Nombre de Dios, Colón, Panama
- Piratical career
- Type: Privateer
- Allegiance: Kingdom of England
- Years active: c. 1585–1596
- Rank: Sergeant Major
- Base of operations: Caribbean Sea
- Commands: Hopewell; Golden Lyon
- Battles: Anglo–Spanish War

Captain John Marchant (c. 1540 – 2 January 1596) served under Sir Francis Drake from 1585 to 1596, thus participating in some of the most important seafaring expeditions and naval encounters of the day. He lost his life near Nombre de Dios, Panama, a few weeks before Drake's own death.

== Early adventures with Drake (1585–1586) ==
In 1585, Captain John Marchant, along with Anthony Platt, was listed as one of ten Captains of companies serving under Sir Francis Drake in the expedition of that year. "Platt and Marchant became staunch adherents of Drake, the latter [Marchant] being Sergeant-Major to the Cádiz expedition in 1587, and both perished in the expedition of 1595."

Captain Marchant served aboard the Hopewell during the 1585–1586 expedition, in which Sir Drake captured from the Spanish A) Santiago, in the Cape Verde Islands west of Africa; B) Santo Domingo, in Hispaniola; and C) Cartagena, in Colombia. After this string of victories, Drake and Marchant sacked and burned St. Augustine, Florida. On the way back up the Atlantic Coast, Drake and Marchant stopped at Roanoke Island, where a colony begun by Sir Walter Raleigh the year before had fallen on hard times. The colonists (all of them lonely men) decided to return with Drake to England.

== Raid on Cádiz (1587) ==
The Spanish Armada was amassing through 1587, preparing for an all-out assault on England. Drake raised 24 ships and headed to Cádiz, Spain, for a preemptive strike. By this time, John Marchant was Sergeant-Major in Drake's navy, serving on the Golden Lyon. Drake's forces routed the ships in Cádiz Harbour; Drake then decided to take the Castle of Sagres, near Cape St. Vincent. His second-in-command, William Borough, was an older naval officer who considered Drake to be not much more than a glorified pirate. He refused to help Drake take Sagres, and was arrested for his insubordination and held aboard the Golden Lyon. Captain Marchant thus came into command of this ship.

After Drake captured Sagres, his ships were separated by a storm. He soon discovered that the Lyon had deserted; Capt. Marchant was found aboard the Spy, having had to evacuate the Lyon. Marchant reported that Borough had inspired a mutiny aboard the Lyon, and although the ship was on its way back to England and out of his reach, Drake called a court-martial and sentenced Borough to death. Borough was eventually tried and found not-guilty, blaming the whole affair on Capt. Marchant:

"Mr. Marchant used no resistance by force and violence to withstand their purpose (which he ought to have done)... the authority of government was wholly committed to the said Captain Marchant..."

== Last voyage with Drake (1595) ==
Marchant accompanied Drake on his ill-fated voyage in 1595, in which both lost their lives. After failing in an attempt to seize a Spanish treasure ship in Puerto Rico, Drake moved on to Panama and took the town of Nombre de Dios (Sp.: "Name of God"), near the modern-day Panama Canal, hoping to intercept the Spanish bringing gold from Peru over the isthmus. On 2 January 1596, Drake's forces marched up a hill only to discover at the last minute that the Spanish had hidden a fort on top of it. Twenty-some Englishmen were killed, including "Quarter-master Generall" Marchant.

Three weeks later, Sir Francis Drake himself succumbed to dysentery, and was buried at sea, in a lead coffin. Capt. Marchant was likely buried at the site of his death, in Panama.
