= Francis Drake's descent on Vigo =

Anglo-Spanish military event in 1585

Drake's descent on Vigo
- Part of the Anglo–Spanish War
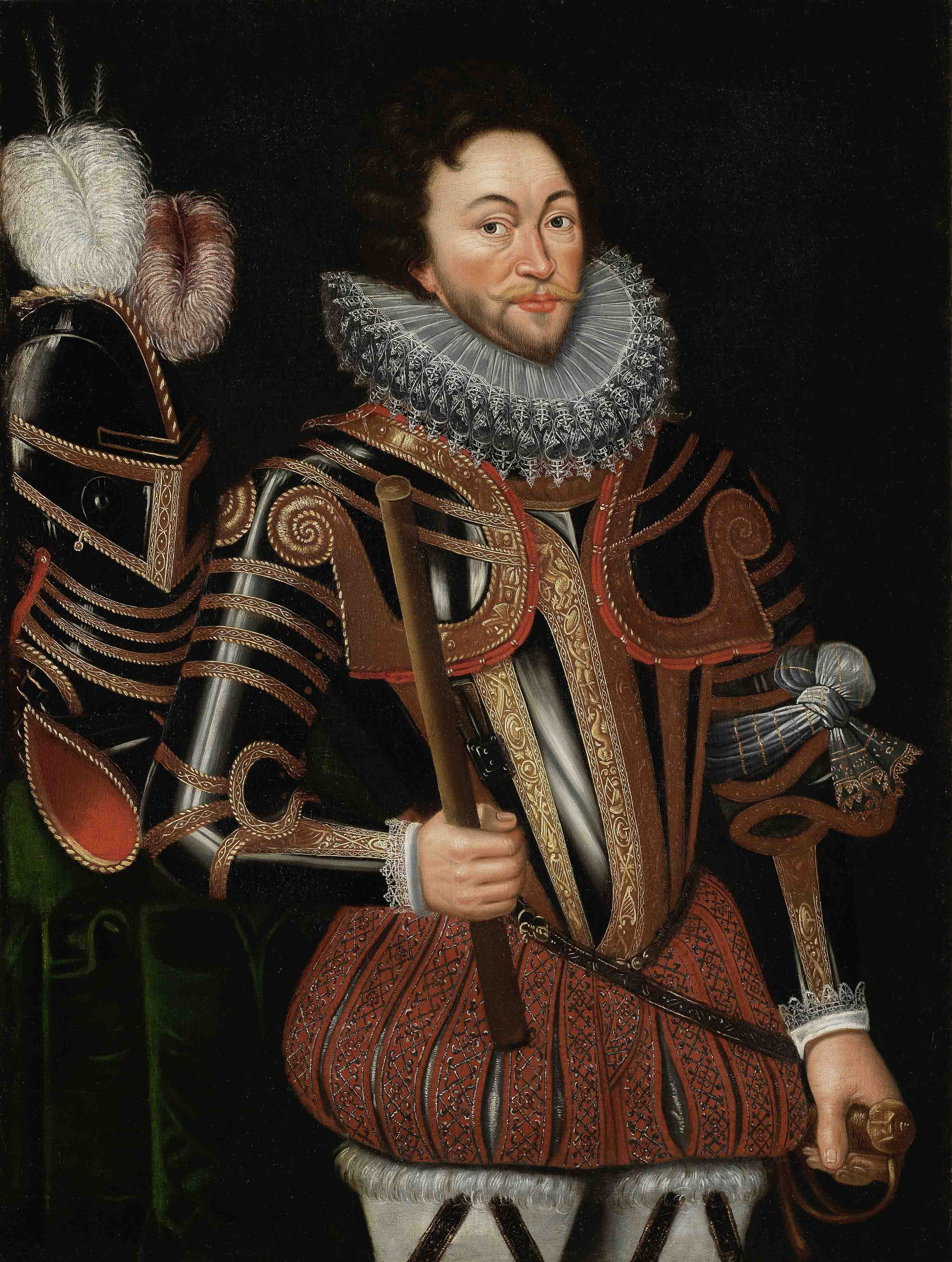
- Portrait of Francis Drake in half-armour,
Location	Bay of Vigo, Spain
Result	English victory

Belligerents
Spain	England

Commanders and leaders
Pedro Bermudez	Sir Francis Drake; Christopher Carleill

Strength
1,000 militia	23 ships, 19 support vessels & prizes, 1,000 troops

Casualties and losses
1 ship captured	1 executed

Drake's descent on Vigo was a military event that took place between September and October 1585 during the early part of the Anglo–Spanish War. Francis Drake leading an English expedition to raid the Spanish Main needed supplies and so hoped needed to make a descent on the Spanish mainland in order to achieve this. Drake arrived at the port town of Vigo, and was able negotiate with the governor Don Pedro Bermudez to get supplies rather use force. Drake was able to gather supplies from Vigo and Bayona for two weeks. From this Drake was able to carry on with his successful expedition to the Spanish Main.

== Background ==
War had already been declared by Philip II of Spain after the Treaty of Nonsuch in which Elizabeth I had offered her support to the rebellious Protestant Dutch rebels. The Queen through Francis Walsingham ordered Sir Francis Drake to lead an expedition to attack the Spanish New World in a kind of preemptive strike.

The rush to leave Plymouth in August 1585, meant that stores were unevenly distributed throughout the fleet, and some vessels were already borrowing food and water from their consorts. The fleet was already on the lookout for supplies - Drake even considered landing in France. A French ship carrying salt was pressed into service and was promised full pay once the expedition had been completed. On 22 September off Cape Finisterre, a large Spanish fishing boat laden with fish was captured by the Tiger. The fish was then distributed throughout the fleet. Drake had enough supplies to last until he reached the Spanish coast. Five days later the fleet reached Vigo Bay, and it dropped anchor in the mouth of the Vigo estuary.

== Vigo, Bayona and Cíes Islands ==
Drake then sent Christopher Carleill to inspect the defences of Vigo and Bayona. With 700 men in a number of boats, Carleill landed on a beach near Bayona. They pillaged the area seizing some boats and desecrated a Catholic chapel. The Governor of the area Don Pedro Bermudez on sighting of this force ordered the militia mustered and had defences prepared. Bermudez sent a messenger to Carleill questioning what the English wanted; Carleill in return wanted to know if any of the English ships and merchantmen that Spain had been seized were under arrest and in what condition and whether England and Spain were at war. Bermudez informed Carleill that they had been released under order from King Philip II. Drake soon arrived with the rest of the fleet and on being told was satisfied that his fellow countrymen had been freed. In return he sent an offer to negotiate with Bermudez regarding supplies. Meanwhile Drake waiting for an answer, sent further landing parties to the nearby Cíes Islands to take on water and plundered the island's settlements. Not long after a storm broke out forcing the English to return to their ships and seek shelter in the river. The storm threatened to force the English ships on shore with cables breaking - one ship was forced to return to England.

After the storm had passed Drake sailed further up the river putting Vigo directly within range of English guns. Bermudez responded by gathering his militia on the city waterfront - 1,000 men, including cavalry. He sent a message to Drake which was accompanied by boat-loads of supplies - bread, oil and wine - a gift from the people of Galicia. Drake then sent a message and offered to talk which Bermudez accepted. Two of Drake's captains rowed ashore as hostages, and in return Bermudez rowed out to meet Drake in person. They talked for two hours, and managed to diffuse any violence. Drake agreed to leave Vigo alone, if he could provision and water his ships without Spanish interference. Bermudez agreed as long as the English respected the inhabitants and Vigo's buildings.

The English fleet remained off the port for the best part of two weeks, and English sailors walked through the streets, protected by the firepower of Drake's ships. One man was hanged on orders by Drake due to an incident. During his time here Drake learned that he had missed his opportunity to intercept the returning Spanish treasure fleet. Part of it had returned safely to Seville before Drake had set sail from England, while the rearguard was expected off the Spanish coast.

Having everything he needed, Drake's fleet finally sailed from Vigo on 11 October unmolested.

== Aftermath ==
Bermudez had to answer for his actions to the Spanish King which was seen as an humiliation, especially when Drake was able to dictate terms on Spanish soil. After his departure the Spanish had no idea where Drake would go next so Philip ordered that the settlements in the New World be warned that Drake was at sea.

In November after taking on water from the undefended La Gomera island, he continued his voyage, heading south towards the former Portuguese Cape Verde islands off the northwest coast of Africa, Drake struck at Santiago and then across the Atlantic before heading to the Spanish colonial city of Santo Domingo which was captured and ransomed on 1 January 1586; following that he successfully attacked the important city of Cartagena on 19 February. Drake went on further to successfully attack the Spanish settlement of St. Augustine in May and then went on to find Sir Walter Raleigh's settlement much further North at Roanoke. By this time Drake had become a name that reverberated around the Spanish Americas.
