= English ship Bonaventure (1567) =

English galleon

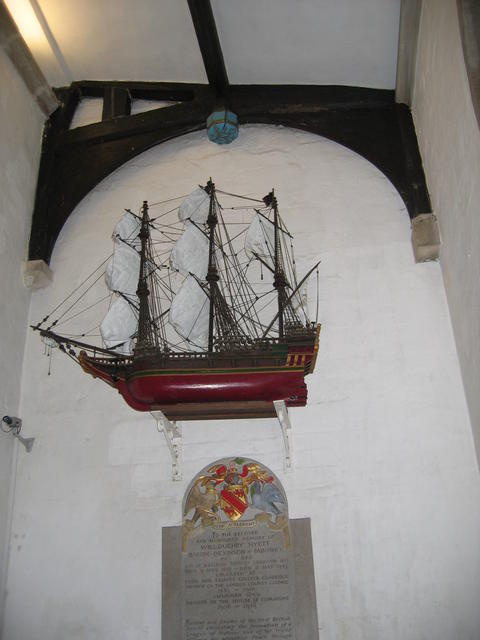
- A model of the Bonaventure, at St Mary's Church, Painswick, a replacement of one damaged during the English Civil War

History

England
- Name: Bonaventure
- Commissioned: purchased for Navy, 1567
- Fate: Unknown
- Notes: Participated in: Attack on Cádiz, 1587; Spanish Armada, 1588

General characteristics
- Type: Galleon
- Tons burthen: 300 / 550
- Armament: 47 guns; 2 × 60-pounder guns; 2 × 34-pounder guns; 11 × 18-pounder guns; 14 × 9-pounder guns; 18 × small guns

Bonaventure (also known as Elizabeth Bonaventure) was a 47-gun galleon purchased by the Royal Navy in 1567. She was the third vessel to bear the name. She was commanded by Sir Francis Drake during his 1587 attack on Cadiz, and a year later was part of the fleet to face the Spanish Armada.

== Service history ==
The ship took part in the Great Expedition by privateer Francis Drake, which raided the Spanish New World in 1585 and 1586. As part of the Expedition, Bonaventure, captained by the veteran seaman Thomas Fenner, was present for Drake's assaults on Santo Domingo, Cartagena de Indias and San Augustin.

=== Attack on Cadiz (1587) ===
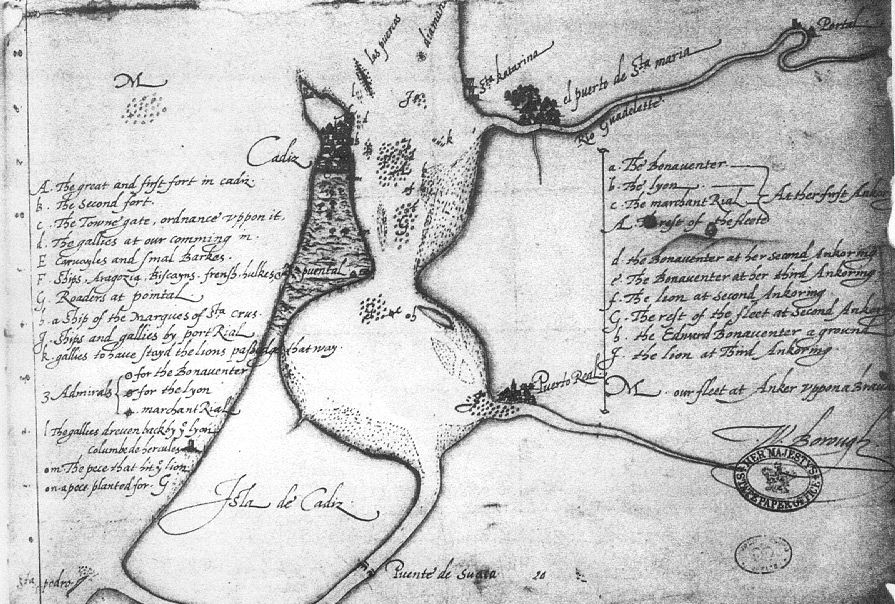
Drake's map of his attack on Cadiz, Bonaventure can be seen at the top of the list of ships on the right

After the execution in February 1587 of Mary, Queen of Scots, Philip II of Spain decided that it was time to invade England, and started to prepare his armada. Bonaventure, under the command of Francis Drake was sent as flagship of the English fleet to try to prevent and/or delay the armada. The fleet numbered roughly twenty-six vessels, which included three more of the Queen's ships in addition to Bonaventure: Golden Lion, Dreadnought and Rainbow; three tall ships of the Levant Company; seven men-of-war of 150–200 tons; and eleven or twelve smaller vessels. His orders from the Queen were:

to prevent the joining together of the King of Spain's fleet out of their different ports. To keep victuals from them. To follow them in case they should come out towards England or Ireland. To cut off as many of them as he could, and prevent their landing. To set upon the West Indian ships as they came or went.

She immediately changed her mind and issued less aggressive orders, but Drake had set sail from England on 12 April 1587 before receiving these orders, and thus acted upon the first. Having heard that the ships were gathering in the harbour at Cádiz, Drake decided to hunt them there. On his arrival seventeen days later, they discovered the inner and outer harbours full of the enemy vessels. After a short discussion with his vice-admiral, Captain William Borough, Drake decided against waiting until the following morning, and led his fleet in. A squadron of galleys commanded by Don Pedro de Acuña were in a state of readiness, and spread across the harbour while one of their number sailed to challenge Drake's oncoming fleet. Before it could get close enough to hail the English, Bonaventure and possibly some of the other vessels close opened fire, sending cannonballs in the direction of the Spanish galleon. Any one of the four Queen's vessels carried more firepower than all of Don Pedro's galleys combined, and the Spanish commander was forced to concentrate on delaying the English fleet to give the other Spanish vessels time to prepare. In time, however, the resistance faded and Drake gained control of the bay.

Over the next month, the fleet sailed up and down the Iberian coast between Lisbon and Cape St Vincent, destroying supplies being sent to Lisbon for the armada. Included in these supplies were a large quantity of barrel staves, according to Drake's personal estimate, enough for over 25,000 tons of provisions and water.

=== Spanish Armada (1588) ===
The following year, Bonaventure, commanded by George Clifford, 3rd Earl of Cumberland, was part of the English fleet to battle the Spanish Armada. During this battle, she carried 51.5 tons of ordnance, totalling over 8% of her maximum tonnage. When surveyed on 25 September 1588, the only damage listed from the battle was to the sails, which were "shot full of holes".

=== Later Voyages ===
These "Later Voyages" were not of the Bonaventure of 1567, also known as the Elizabeth Bonaventure. That ship was broken up in 1611. The first section of the "Later Voyages" chronicles the voyages of the Edward Bonaventur, a ship of the Levant Company as early as 1581. Both Elizabeth Bonaventure and Edward Bonaventure served against the Spanish Armada; Edward Bonaventure was commanded by James Lancaster.

Edward Bonaventure then set out on an early expedition that became a forerunner to the East India Company; according to Sir George C. V. Holmes, Bonaventure (operating under the auspices of the Levant Company) was the first English ship to make a successful voyage to India. On 10 April 1591, James Lancaster sailed from Plymouth, England with Edward Bonaventure and two other ships, Penelope and Merchant Royal. Lancaster reached Table Bay on 1 August 1591. He sent Merchant Royal back to England with sickly crewmen, and moved the healthier men to the two remaining ships. Penelope was lost in a storm off Cape Correntes on 12 September. Edward Bonaventure arrived at Zanzibar on 7 November, rested and refitted until February 1592, rounded Cape Comorin the following May, and reached Penang in the Malay Peninsula in June. Lancaster remained at Penang until September, venturing out to pillage Spanish and Portuguese vessels. The return voyage commenced on 8 December 1592. Doubling the Cape of Good Hope] in March, the ship reached St. Helena 3 April 1593. Edward Bonaventure sailed to the West Indies where Captain Lancaster and a large portion of the crew were stranded on shore when the ship sailed away. These castaways were picked up by a French ship and carried to Dieppe, where they arrived on 19 May 1594. Bonaventure survived the journey back to England in 1594.

In 1626 she was apparently still in service under Royal Navy Captain John Chudleigh in an expedition under Montagu Bertie, 2nd Earl of Lindsey. (He was the son of John Chidley, one of Walter Raleigh's friends.)

The second section of "Later Voyages" is probably about the Royal Navy ship built at Deptford in 1621.

== In literature ==
This is this ship referred to in Letitia Elizabeth Landon's poem "The Sailor's Bride, or The Bonaventure" in Fisher's Drawing Room Scrap Book (1839).

== Bibliography ==
- Elton, Letitia MacColl (1906). The Story of Sir Francis Drake (1906 ed.). London: T. C. & E. C. Jack.
- Martin, Colin; Parker, Geoffrey (1999). The Spanish Armada (1999 ed.). Mandolin. ISBN 1-901341-14-3.
- Mattingly, Garrett (2005). The Armada (2005 ed.). Mariner Books. ISBN 0-618-56591-4.
- Imperial Gazetteer of India vol. II (1908), The Indian Empire, Historical, Published under the authority of His Majesty's Secretary of State for India in Council, Oxford at the Clarendon Press. Pp. xxxv, 1 map, 573
