= John Marchant =

John Marchant may refer to:

- John Le Marchant (British Army officer, born 1803), colonial administrator in Newfoundland Colony
- John Marchant (seaman) (1540–1596), sea captain under Sir Francis Drake
- John Marchant (surveyor), New Zealand surveyor and cricketer

== See also ==
- John Le Marchant (disambiguation)
