= John Le Marchant =

John Le Marchant may refer to:

- John Le Marchant (British Army officer, born 1766) (1766–1812), British Army cavalry major-general killed at Salamanca
- Sir John Le Marchant (British Army officer, born 1803) (1803–1874), British Army general and Governor of Newfoundland, son of the above

== See also ==
- John Marchant (disambiguation)
