= John Chudleigh (MP for Lostwithiel) =

English privateer, nobleman, knight and MP

John Chudleigh/Chidley of Stretchleigh, Ermington, Devon (c. 1584 - c. 1634) was an English privateer, captain, nobleman, knight, and member of Parliament for Lostwithiel.

== Origins ==
John Chudleigh was the son of an unsuccessful privateer and nobleman named John Chidley (d. 1589) and Elizabeth, daughter of George Speake. His family was a family of ancient nobility whose first major member about whom much is known was James de Chudleigh (d. ~1401).

The family had long been involved with local government having held the office of Sheriff of Devon 5 times and having produced several members of parliament. He was the brother of Sir George Chudleigh, 1st Baronet.

== Career ==
In 1617 he bought the ship the Flying Joan for 350 pounds and renamed it the Flying Chudleigh launching his naval career. He joined his relative Walter Raleigh's second expedition to Venezuela in pursuit of a treasure mine rumored to exist in Guiana. He did not take part in the attack on the Spanish settlement of St. Thomas but instead stood by his relative Raleigh who was following orders from King James I not to attack the Spanish.

The Spanish warded off the attack and although Chudleigh gained some loot from the expedition, his ship was impounded thanks to the efforts of the Spanish Ambassador to England Diego Sarmiento de Acuña, Count of Gondomar although he avoided being executed like his relative Walter Raleigh. In 1618 he petitioned the king and obtained the release of his ship.

Chudleigh sold his ship and received command of an armed Merchant ship as captain and participated in the effort to defeat Algerian Pirates in 1620. In June 1621 he and Sir Thomas Wilsford sunk one of the Algerians best Man-of-war ships, helped put other galleys to flight, and on his return to England received 30 pounds as Bounty (reward).

In 1624 he was given command of the ship Speedwell (1577 ship) and ordered to scour the English Channel. In October he transported the Count Ernst von Mansfeld to Flushing. In May 1625 he was given command of the English ship Rainbow (1586) where he joined the Cádiz expedition (1625) under Robert Devereux, 3rd Earl of Essex. Before the expedition he was knighted.

In 1626 he was appointed captain of the Bonaventure (1567) and served under Montagu Bertie, 2nd Earl of Lindsey. Later he was reappointed to be captain of the ship, and although he asked to be a messenger in George Villiers, 1st Duke of Buckingham's planned expedition Île de Ré his ship was not included in the ship which sailed for France. In the relief expedition led by Henry Rich, 1st Earl of Holland he was the Vice admiral.

The relief expedition did not arrive in time and on his return to England his ship was badly damaged which temporarily put him out of command and instead he was given a place on the council of war in 1628. His fellow councilors appointed him and two other captains to advise the Duke of Buckingham on the number of ships he would need to provide a constant guard of the Narrow Seas.

While he was on the council he submitted several proposals including one which he had made as early as 1625 to have temporary hospitals in convenient places to treat the ill and wounded. He played a dominant role aboard the flagship and his approval was required for plans to proceed. The day after presenting his proposals to the council of war he was elected to Parliament in Lostwithiel succeeding his brother in law Reginald Mohun (died 1642) (the same seat had been held by his elder brother in 1625).

After the Siege of La Rochelle naval operations in England were scaled back and Chudleigh was left without naval employment. The Board of Admiralty nominated him to serve as Admiral of the Narrow Seas but this was overruled by Charles I of England who perhaps recalled his tardiness in October 1627 and appointed Chudleighs former peer John Penington. In consideration of his services Chudleigh was granted a small French prize ship the St Mary instead.

In 1631 he bought the Wardship of William Lacy of Somerset for 200 pounds showing that he was still quite wealthy.

== Offices held ==
- Privateer Captain 1617-1618
- Captain in the Royal Navy 1620-1621, 1623-1628
- Commissioner to arrest the ship Esperance and make an inventory of its goods in 1624
- Vice Admiral 1628
- Member of the council of war 1628

== Marriages ==
His first marriage was a prestigious one to Margaret Courtenay daughter of William Courtenay (died 1630). His second marriage was to a more obscure woman Dorothy Norris daughter of Richard Norris. It is uncertain if he had any children.
