= Battle of Santo Domingo (1586) =

Early battle in the Anglo-Spanish War

- Part of the Anglo–Spanish War
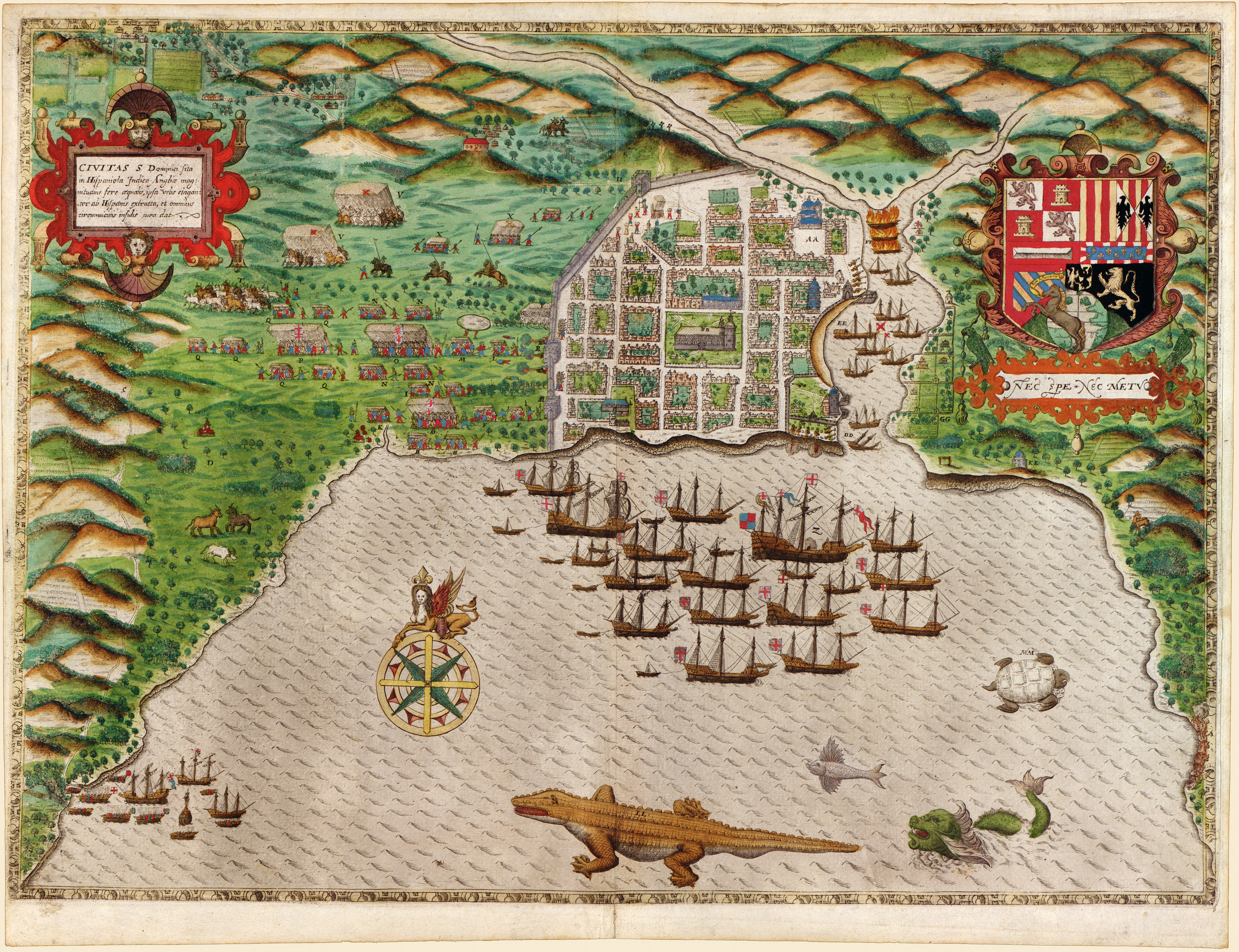
- Sir Francis Drake in Santo Domingo 1585, hand-colored engraving, by Baptista Boazio, 1589
Date	1 January 1586
Location	Santo Domingo, Hispaniola (Present day Dominican Republic) 18°28′24″N 69°52′54″W
Result	English victory

Belligerents
Spain	England

Commanders and leaders
Cristóbal de Ovalle	Francis Drake; Christopher Carleill

Strength
1,400 soldiers and militia 100 cavalry 30 diverse warships, 1 galley	23 ships 2,300 soldiers & sailors

Casualties and losses
200 killed, wounded or captured, 1 galley sunk, 20 ships burned, 3 ships captured	20 casualties 3 ships scuttled

The Battle of Santo Domingo (1586) or the Capture of Santo Domingo was a military and naval action fought on 1 January 1586, of the recently declared Anglo-Spanish War that resulted in the assault and capture by English soldiers and sailors of the Spanish city of Santo Domingo governed by Cristóbal de Ovalle on the Spanish island of Hispaniola. The English were led by Francis Drake and was part of his Great Expedition to raid the Spanish New World in a kind of preemptive strike. The English soldiers then occupied the city for over a month and captured much booty along with a 25,000 ducat ransom before departing on 1 February.

== Background ==
War had already been unofficially declared by Philip II of Spain after the Treaty of Nonsuch in which Elizabeth I had offered her support to the rebellious Protestant Dutch rebels. The Queen through Francis Walsingham ordered Sir Francis Drake to lead an expedition to attack the Spanish New World in a kind of preemptive strike. Sailing from Plymouth, England, he first attacked Vigo in Spain and held the place for two weeks ransoming supplies, after which he struck at Santiago in November 1585 in the Cape Verde Islands plundering the place, then sailed for the Americas.

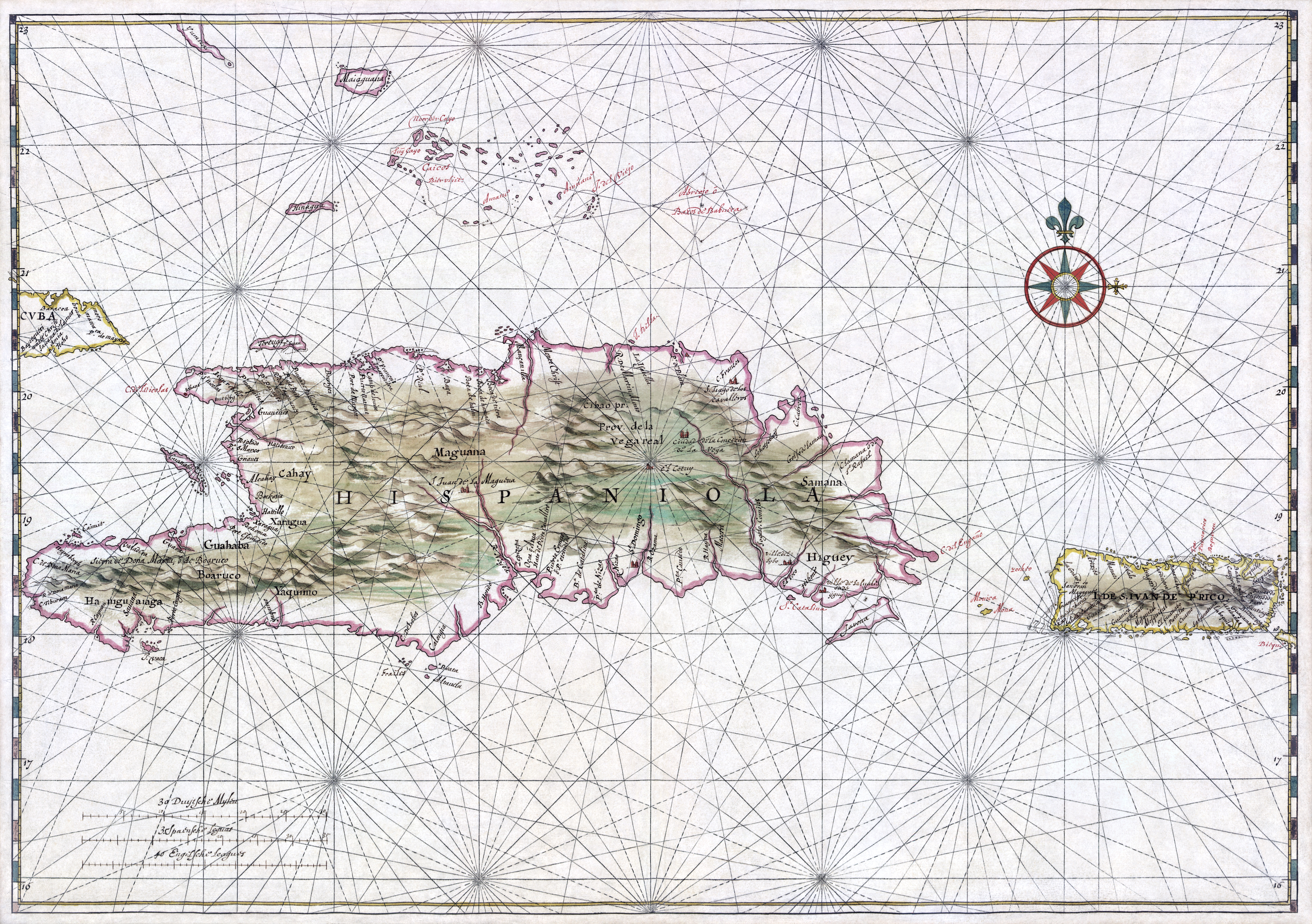
The island of Hispaniola

Drake arrived in the Caribbean in December at the uninhabited island of Saint Kitts, where he landed his sick and sought supplies. Whilst there he sent a small reconnaissance squadron to the Spanish city of Santo Domingo on the island of Hispaniola. Santo Domingo was the capital of Spain's New World Empire and it was fortified on its landward side by a city wall built in the early 1500s known as the Fortaleza Ozama in which stood the Torre de Homenaje (tower of Homage). The governor, Cristóbal de Ovalle, was well provided with artillery batteries covering both land and sea and had nearly 1,500 men, of which 100 were cavalry. The naval defenses of the city consisted of one galley and although it was largely unseaworthy was still capable of posing a threat.

=== English arrival ===
As Drake sailed westwards he encountered his reconnaissance squadron, who told him that Santo Domingo looked too formidable to assault from the sea, but that they had found a good landing beach at the mouth of the Haina River about ten miles further to the west. Drake had the fortune of knowing that surprise would be on his side since the Spanish had no idea the English fleet was in the area.

Just after midnight on 1 January 1586 Drake arrived off the Bajos de Haina, and Carleill and his soldiers landed on the beach which wasn't guarded. The path through the jungle that led towards the city was also defenseless and the English advanced forward. The main fleet under Drake meanwhile sailed ten miles along the coast to Santo Domingo. The Spanish soon saw the threat; troops were mustered, work began on building earthworks to defend the shore, whilst many of the townspeople began slipping out of the city. At the mouth of the harbor, three ships were sunk to prevent any attempt to force the entrance but it was too late.

== Battle ==
On New Years Day Drake's ships lay off the mouth of the harbor, just within artillery range and as English ships took up their stations, Drake ran out his guns and engaged the castle. The Spanish fire soon replied and one round shot hit the Elizabeth Bonaventure, but most of the balls fell short. Drake ordered his ships in closer, and soon they began firing at the castle and the earthworks and this got the Spanish distracted as he had hoped.

=== Assault ===
Carleill and 800 soldiers approached the city through the jungle, and by noon they were in sight of Santo Domingo. Drake then sent men in boats to make a show of attempting a landing by way of a diversion. The Spanish in response sent horse, foot, and artillery which advanced out of the city from the two gates nearest the shore, with the intention of taking up a position facing the sea with the cavalry covering their right flank. Scarcely had they formed however Carleill and his men swept out of the jungle, formed up into two columns of 1,000 men with standards flying and music playing appearing on the right flank of the Spanish.

Cristobal de Ovalle, seeing that he would be cut off from the town, took up a new position covering the town gates, whilst his cavalry threatened the English flank and rear under cover of a herd of cattle. Carleill however placed his pikemen and musketeers on every side, so that the Spanish were driven back and the cattle simply ran into the jungle. With both columns still advancing they received the fire of the Spanish guns at very close quarters. An ambuscade of Spanish musketeers beside the road had no better success as these were quickly driven back by English fire. Within half an hour, the landing party had reached the western walls of Santo Domingo, and the majority of the Spanish troops and militia were in flight.

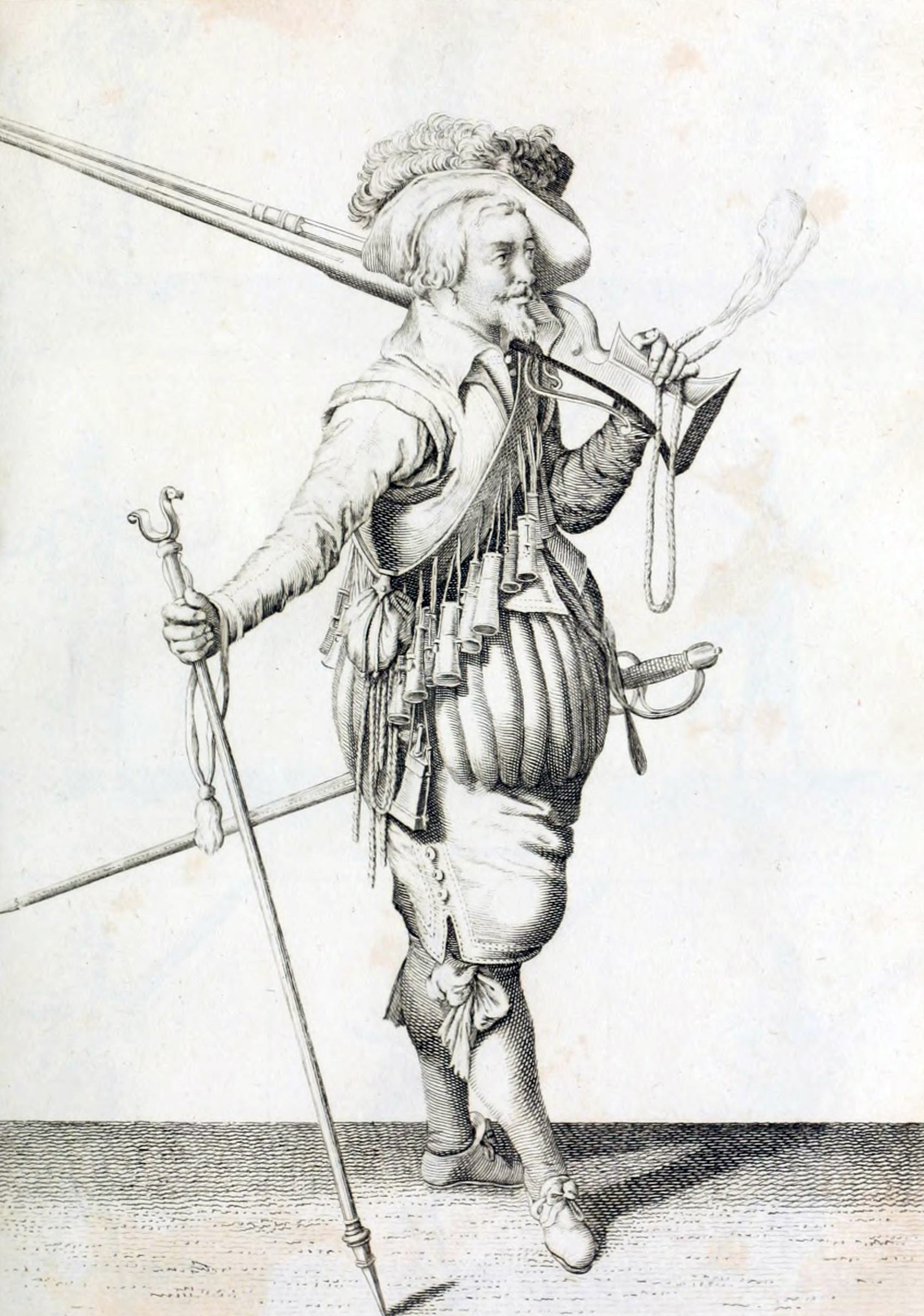
An English musketeer at the time of the assault

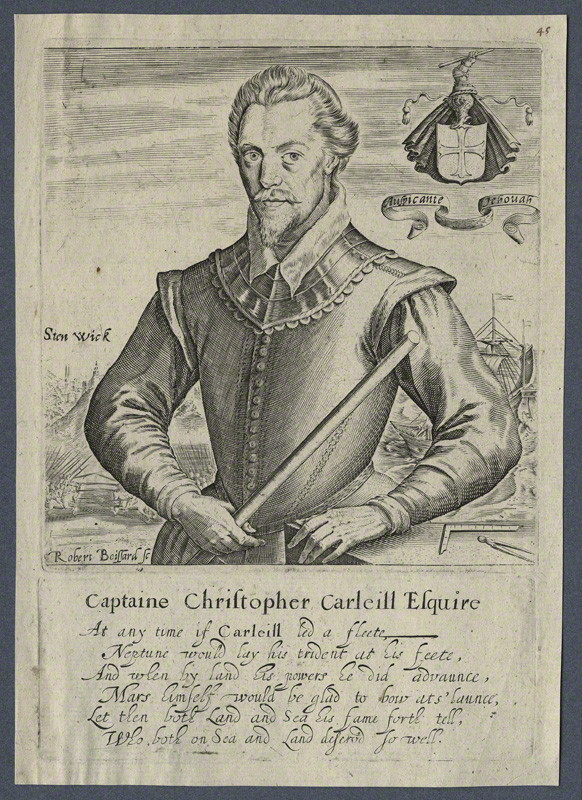
Christopher Carleill who commanded the English troops

=== Capture ===
The western defenses were pierced by two gates: the Lenba (the main gate) and a secondary one, closer to the beach. By this stage there were scarcely 300 Spaniards left, most of which had no firearms. Carleill ordered Sergeant-Major Powell to assault the secondary gate with a storming party, while the lieutenant-general led the rest of his men towards the Lenba. Both English columns broke into a run and charged at the push of pike. Following a mingled, fierce, hand-to-hand fight, the Spanish were swept on through both gates and then melted away, after which neither column met with any serious opposition. The stormers did not stop until the two English columns met in the Plaza.

The English were now inside the town and began hunting the Spanish troops through the streets, heading towards the Fortaleza Ozama, the main defense of Santo Domingo; if this fell then Santo Domingo would fall. A small group of Spanish troops held out behind its walls, while the remainder of the city was captured without any opposition. Cristóbal de Ovalle fled the battle and left his wife behind, who became Drake's principal hostage. The fortress held out until nightfall still under bombardment by the English on land and sea, but under cover of darkness the remaining garrison slipped away by boat, and by dawn the English flag was flying over the Torre de Homenaje in the middle of the Fortaleza Ozama. The English secured their positions, the battle was over and Santo Domingo was now in their hands. The assault had cost Carleill only seven killed and around twenty wounded, and given the lack of serious resistance the Spanish losses were around the same although they had nearly 200 men captured.

== Occupation ==
Drake ordered his men to repair the city's defenses, in case of a Spanish counter-attack. The harbor was also secured and ships of which there were over twenty were taken or burnt. The English sailors and soldiers then went on a looting spree; churches were singled out, ornaments were stolen, statues and windows smashed, religious tapestries ripped down, and altars desecrated. Then public buildings were looted and from private homes the English took what they could. While plenty of goods were captured, including food, wine, and tobacco, only 16,000 gold ducats were recovered from the Audencia's treasury. The cathedral however was saved from destruction as it was where Drake set up his headquarters and prayers and psalms were sung and said in thanks to God for their victory.

=== Ransom ===
Drake knew the Spanish would be willing to negotiate a ransom, in return for the saving of their town and the lives of his prisoners. On 12 January the head of the city judiciary, Juan Malarejo, approached Drake and negotiations began. Drake demanded a huge figure of one million ducats which the Governor declared himself wholly unable to pay. Malarejo procrastinated and as talks continued Drake ordered civic buildings and churches to be put to the torch, one after the other. Applying extra pressure on Malarejo; Drakes men began demolishing the city's imposing stone buildings, which exhausted the English sailors due to the intense labor.

The next Spanish negotiator was García Fernández de Torrequemada, the royal factor on Hispaniola but Malarejo overruled him, being much more stubborn. So Drake set fire to more buildings and threatened to destroy his own headquarters the oldest church in the whole of the Americas but eventually Malarejo offered a ransom of 25,000 ducats.

=== Payment ===
Finally the deal was agreed, and Drake promised to spare what remained of the town and sail away from it if the ransom was paid promptly. Drake sent a delegation to the Spanish camp with a message with a black boy freed from slavery who had recently joined the English. The Spanish however thinking this as an insult stabbed and killed him which infuriated Drake so much that he had many Spaniards deliberately executed until the murderer was found dead or alive. The Spanish complied and brought the man to justice by hanging him in front of the city. The ransom was finally paid during the last days of January.

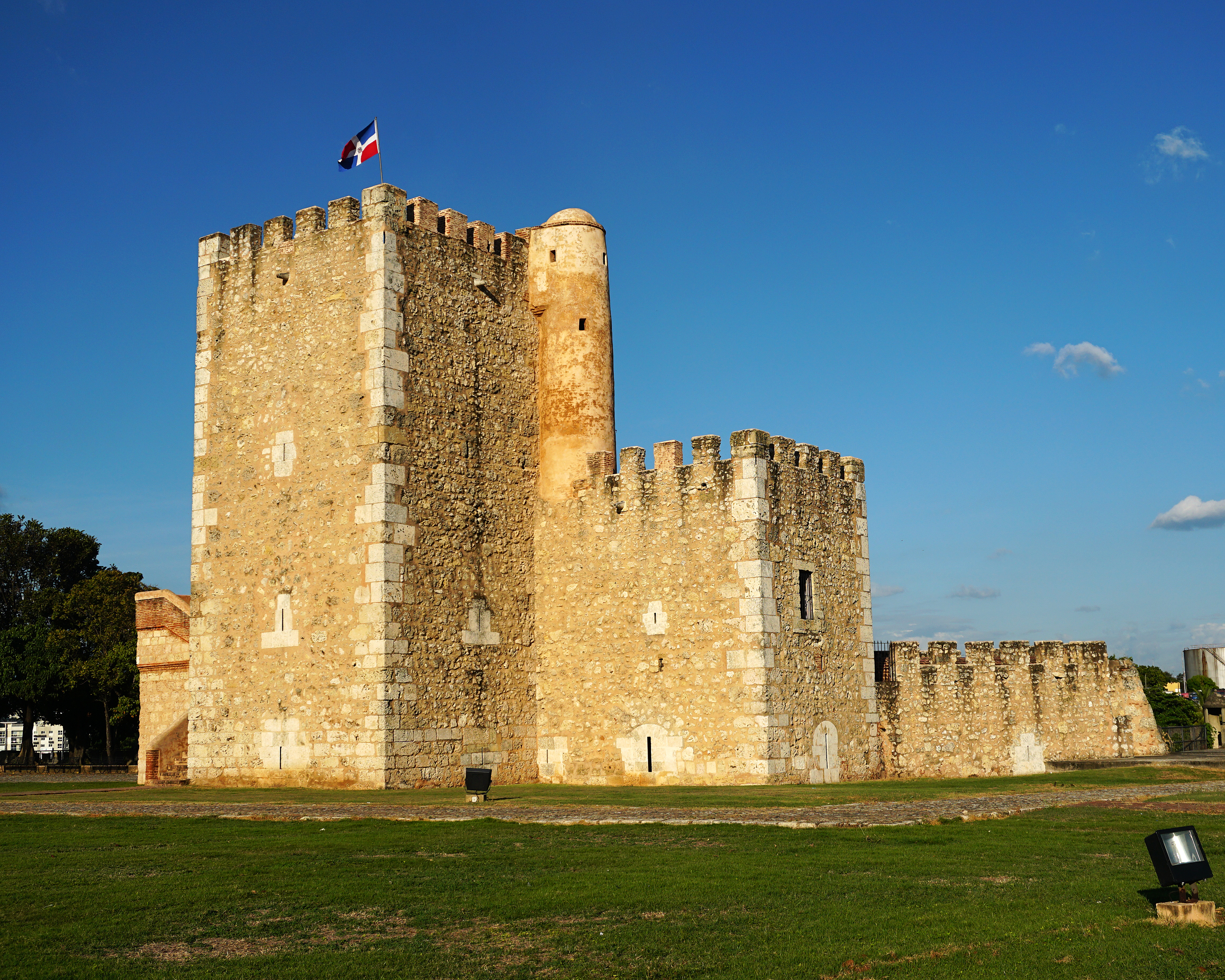
The Homage Tower at Fortaleza Ozama

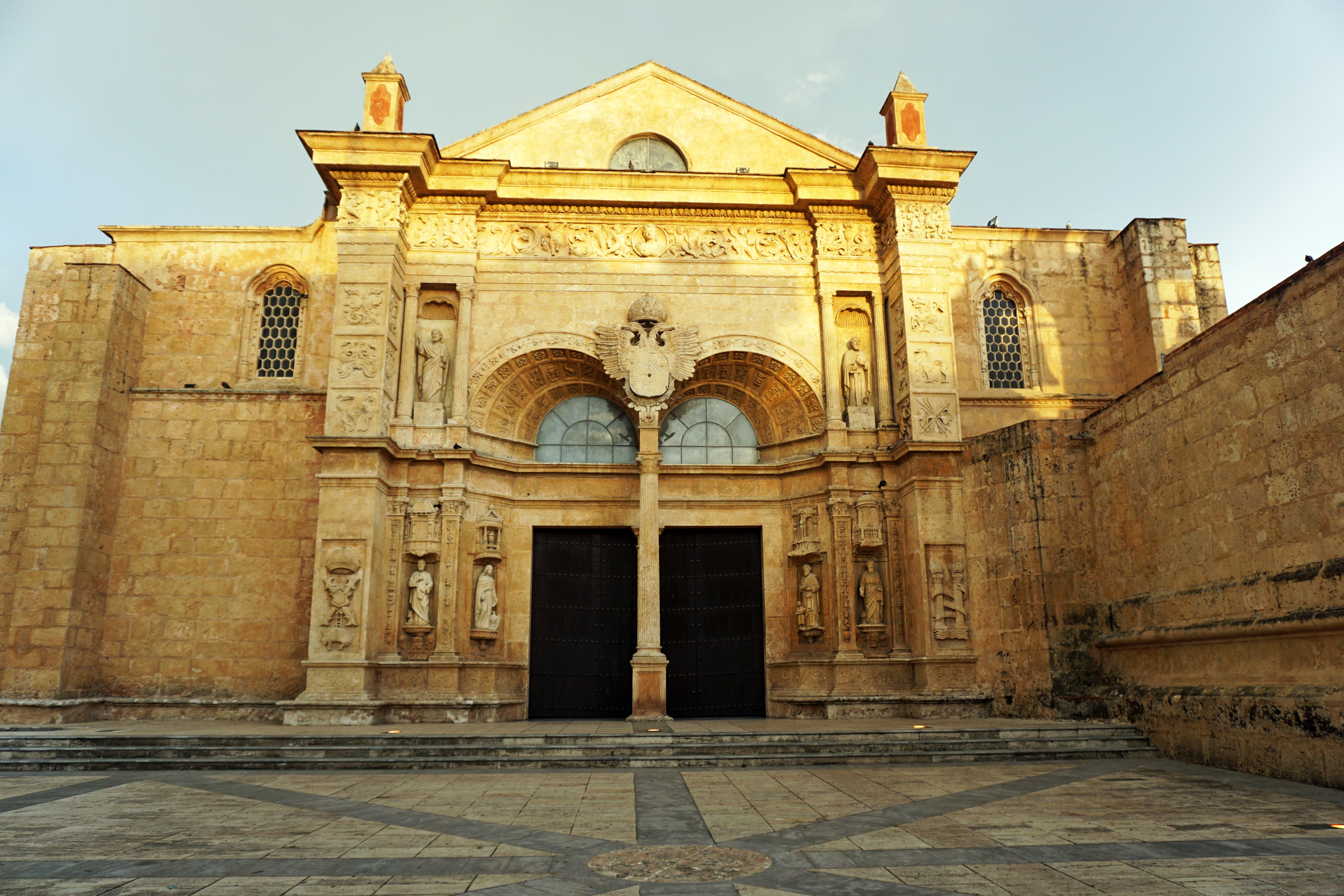
Cathedral of Santa María la Menor at Santo Domingo; Drake used it as his headquarters during the occupation

== Aftermath ==
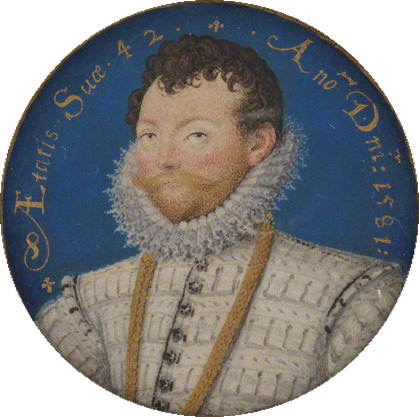
Portrait miniature of Sir Francis Drake painted in 1581

On 1 February the English sailed away from Santo Domingo, having occupied the city for exactly a month. Upwards of 20 ships in the harbor were burned or sunk, the galley had been torched and three vessels were commandeered by Drake to replace three of his ships; Hope, Benjamin, and Scout that had to be abandoned as unseaworthy. One of the largest ships that was captured was a 600-ton armed merchant which the English renamed the New Years Gift. Two hundred and forty guns and quantities of merchandise were moved into the holds of the English ships, their ranks recruited from scores of liberated galley-slaves. A third of Santo Domingo itself lay in ruins and when the Spanish slowly returned they found all of its civic, military, and religious buildings had been destroyed. García Fernández de Torrequemada summed up the mood of the population in his report to the King:

This thing must have had divine sanction, as punishment for the people's sins.

As Drake left and headed south, news of his attack spread from Santo Domingo to other cities on the Spanish Main, warning that the English were likely to descend on them. Rumors soon spread to Europe and the Spanish got many conflicting reports of what happened. Pope Sixtus V commented about Drakes action:

God only knows what he may succeed in doing.

For Santo Domingo it would take many decades to recover from Drake's onslaught. For the Spanish it was major disaster, in particular a blow to prestige and for the English a huge morale boost both in England and on board the fleet. Drake's next target was the city of Cartagena de Indias on the mainland of New Granada. Drake attacked and captured the place giving it the same rough treatment as Santo Domingo; here the city was better defended and the ransom was more lucrative.

== See also ==
- Battle of Cartagena de Indias (1586)
- Raid on St. Augustine
- Battle of San Juan (1595)
- Siege of Santo Domingo (1655)
