= Christopher Carleill =

English military and naval commander

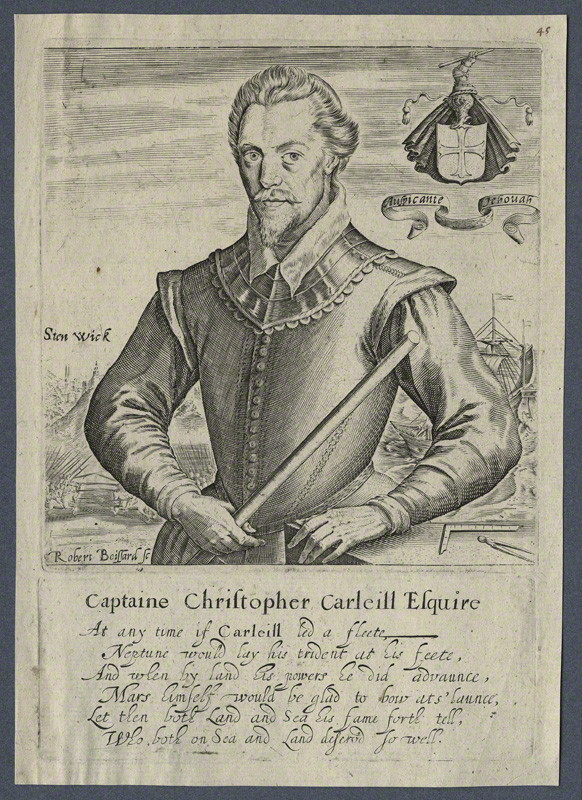
- A line engraving of Capt. Christopher Carleill (artist unknown)
- Born: c. 1551; London, England
- Died: 11 November 1593 (aged 41–42); London
- Military career
- Allegiance: Kingdom of England
- Branch: English Army
- Service years: 1573–1593
- Rank: Captain
- Conflicts: Anglo-Spanish War: Siege of Middelburg; Siege of Steenwijk; Capture of Santiago; Battle of Santo Domingo; Battle of Cartagena de Indias; Raid on St. Augustine

Christopher Carleill (Note: Also spelled Carlile, Carlisle, or Carliell) (c. 1551 – 1593) was an English military and naval commander.

== Life ==
Born about 1551, he was the son of Alexander Carleill, citizen and vintner of London, by his wife Anne, daughter of Sir George Barne. After Alexander's death, Christopher's mother Anne married Francis Walsingham in January 1562; Walsingham was spymaster to Queen Elizabeth I of England. Anne died in 1564 and left her son Christopher in Walsingham's care.

Christopher was educated at the University of Cambridge. In 1572 he went to Flushing (Vlissingen), and was present at the Siege of Middelburg. Lodewijk van Boisot, the Dutch admiral, had a high opinion of his advice. Afterwards, he went with one ship and a vessel of smaller size to La Rochelle to serve under Henri, Prince of Condé, who was about to send supplies to the town of Brouage, then besieged by Charles, Duke of Mayenne. Condé had intended to attack the royal fleet in person, but on the arrival of Carleill, the command was given to him.

Having discharged this duty he went to serve Steenwijk in Overijssel, then besieged by the Spanish. He was then placed at the head of the English troops at the fortress of Zwarte Sluis. When leading troops there to the army he was surprised by a body of the enemy consisting of two thousand foot and six hundred horse. He vigorously resisted them, inflicting heavy losses. As inconvenience arose from the great number of foreigners in the camp of the Prince of Orange the sole command was given to Carleill. After the siege of Steenwick was raised he went to Antwerp, and he was on the point of returning to England, when he was sent for by the prince and the confederate states again to assume the sole command of the camp until Sir John Norreys should arrive to share the command with him. Altogether he served the Prince of Orange for five years, without receiving pay.

He conveyed the English merchants to Russia in 1582, when Frederick II of Denmark was at war with the Russians. The Danish fleet met them, but, observing his squadron of eleven ships, did not venture on an engagement. The Russian envoy got on board at the port of St. Nicholas, and was conveyed to England. By the interest of his stepfather (the old DNB says "father-in-law", a term that meant "stepfather" in the 16th century; Carleill was unmarried), Sir Francis Walsingham, Carleill received £1,000 subscribed at Bristol for an attempt to discover the coast of America lying to the south-west of Cape Breton Island, and proposed to the Russian merchants to raise more in London, and to settle one hundred men in their intended plantation. The project appears to have been unsuccessful, but Carleill wrote a summary of its advantages.

In 1584, Sir John Perrot, Lord Lieutenant of Ireland, appointed Carleill commander of the garrison of Coleraine and the district of Route, County Antrim. Being recalled to England in 1585 in consequence of disputes with Perrot, he was, through the influence of Walsingham, made lieutenant-general of the land forces, consisting of above 2,300 troops, in the expedition to Santo Domingo, Sir Francis Drake being at the head of the fleet, consisting of twenty-one sail. Carleill was captain of the Tiger and in charge of the troops that were conveyed which first made a successful descent on Vigo gathering much needed supplies. This was soon followed by the plundering of Santiago in the Cape Verde, after which they then seized Santo Domingo, captured Cartagena de Indias, and St. Augustine.

On 26 July 1588, he was appointed constable of Carrickfergus, County Antrim. In 1588, he was governor of Ulster. On 10 June 1590, he wrote to Lord Burghley, requesting a commission from the queen to seize for lawful prize any goods which might be found in England belonging to Spanish subjects, and complaining of his monetary losses in her service. At the same time, he pursued his literary interests, enjoying the company of writers like Edmund Spenser and Lodowick Bryskett.

Carleill died in London on 11 November 1593. John Stow said he utterly abhorred piracy; Sir John Perrot entertained a different opinion of Carleill's views of piracy.

== Works ==
He is the author of:

- 'A Brief Summary Discourse upon a Voyage intending to the uttermost parts of America.' Written in 1583 and printed in Hakluyt's 'Voyages,’ iii. 182.

Left in manuscripts were:

- 'Christopher Carleill's suit to Lord Burghley for a commission to seize Spanish goods,’ 1590.
- 'A Discourse on the Discovery of the hithermost parts of America, written by Capt. Carleill to the Citizens of London.'
- 'Account of advantages to the realm from a sudden seizure of books, letters, papers, &c. of the Low Country people residing and inhabiting under the obedience of the king of Spain, with answers to objections.'
