= John Chidley =

English nobleman and privateer

John Chidley (died 1589) was an English nobleman and privateer after whom Cape Chidley and the Cape Chidley Islands in Canada are named.

== Biography ==
His family was a family of ancient nobility in Devon whose first major member about whom much is known was James de Chudleigh (d. ~1401). The family had long been involved with local government having held the office of Sheriff of Devon 5 times and having produced several members of parliament. He was married to the daughter of George Speke (died 1584). The family had their caput manor at Manor of Ashton.

== Career ==
At the age of 19 he sailed with Humphrey Gilbert on his last voyage. He was brought into close contact with Sir Walter Raleigh and was also a friend of John Davis (explorer), some of the most famous English explorers of the time who also belonged to the Devon nobility. In 1586 he was a knight of the shire for Devon with Walter Raleigh as his partner. In August 1, 1587 his friend John Davis (explorer) named Cape Chidley after him in Canada.

In 1589 inspired by the success of Thomas Cavendish in raiding Chile and Peru he sold some of his estates and equipped a group of five ships with Raleigh's support at court. He died on this voyage from disease but left issue.

== Children ==
- Sir George Chudleigh, 1st Baronet
- John Chudleigh (MP for Lostwithiel)
- Bridget Carew, wife of Sir Richard Carew, 1st Baronet
- Dorothy Mohun, wife of Sir Reginald Mohun, 1st Baronet
