= Battle of Cartagena de Indias (1586) =

Part of the Anglo-Spanish War

- Part of the Anglo–Spanish War
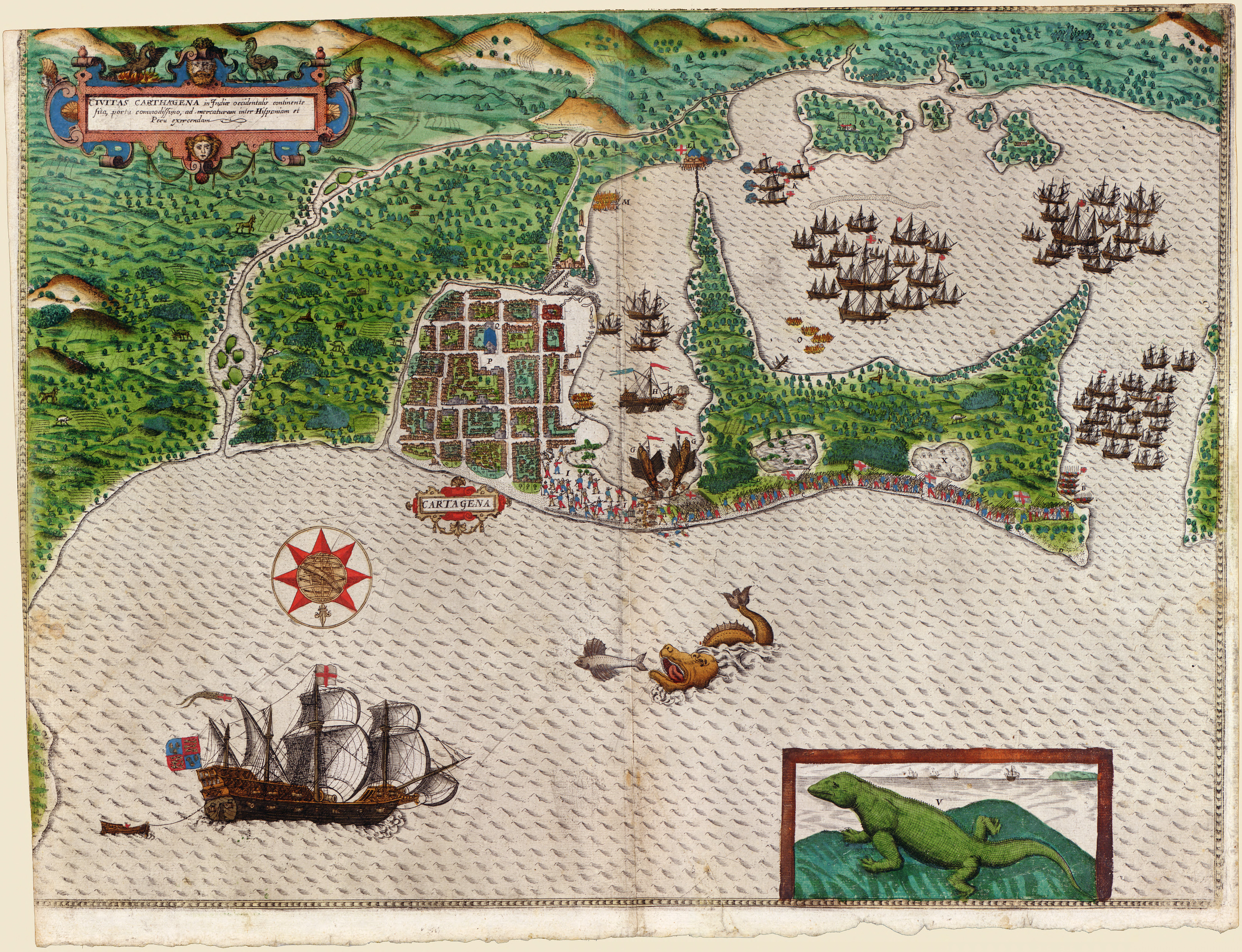
- Sir Francis Drake in Cartagena de Indias 1585. From a hand-colored engraving, by Baptista Boazio, 1589
| Date | 9–11 February 1586 |
| Location | Cartagena de Indias, New Kingdom of Granada (Present-day Colombia) 10.4225°N 75.5392°W |
| Result | English victory |

Belligerents
| Spain | England |

Commanders and leaders
| Gov Pedro de Bustos; Pedro Vique Manrique | Francis Drake; Christopher Carleill |

Strength
| 900 soldiers & militia, 400 Indian allies, 2 galleys 1 galleass 300 sailors Various forts | 30 ships 2,300 soldiers & sailors |

Casualties and losses
| 20 killed wounded or captured, | 28 killed and 50 wounded 1 prize sunk |

The Battle of Cartagena de Indias (1586) or the Capture of Cartagena de Indias was a military and naval action fought on 9–11 February 1586, of the recently declared Anglo-Spanish War that resulted in the assault and capture by English soldiers and sailors of the Spanish colony city of Cartagena de Indias (now part of Colombia) governed by Pedro de Bustos on the Spanish Main. The English were led by Francis Drake. The raid was part of his Great Expedition to the Spanish New World. The English soldiers then occupied the city for over two months and captured much booty along with a ransom before departing on 12 April.

== Origins ==
War had already been unofficially declared by Philip II of Spain after the Treaty of Nonsuch in which Elizabeth I had offered her support to the rebellious Protestant Dutch rebels. The Queen through Francis Walsingham ordered Sir Francis Drake to lead an expedition to attack the Spanish New World in a kind of preemptive strike. Sailing from Plymouth, England, he struck first at Santiago in November 1585 then sailed across the Atlantic on New Years Day 1586 to the Spanish New world city of Santo Domingo in the Caribbean, which was captured, plundered, and a 25,000-ducat ransom extorted. Drake, having raided Cartagena harbor a decade before, decided this important place was the next target.

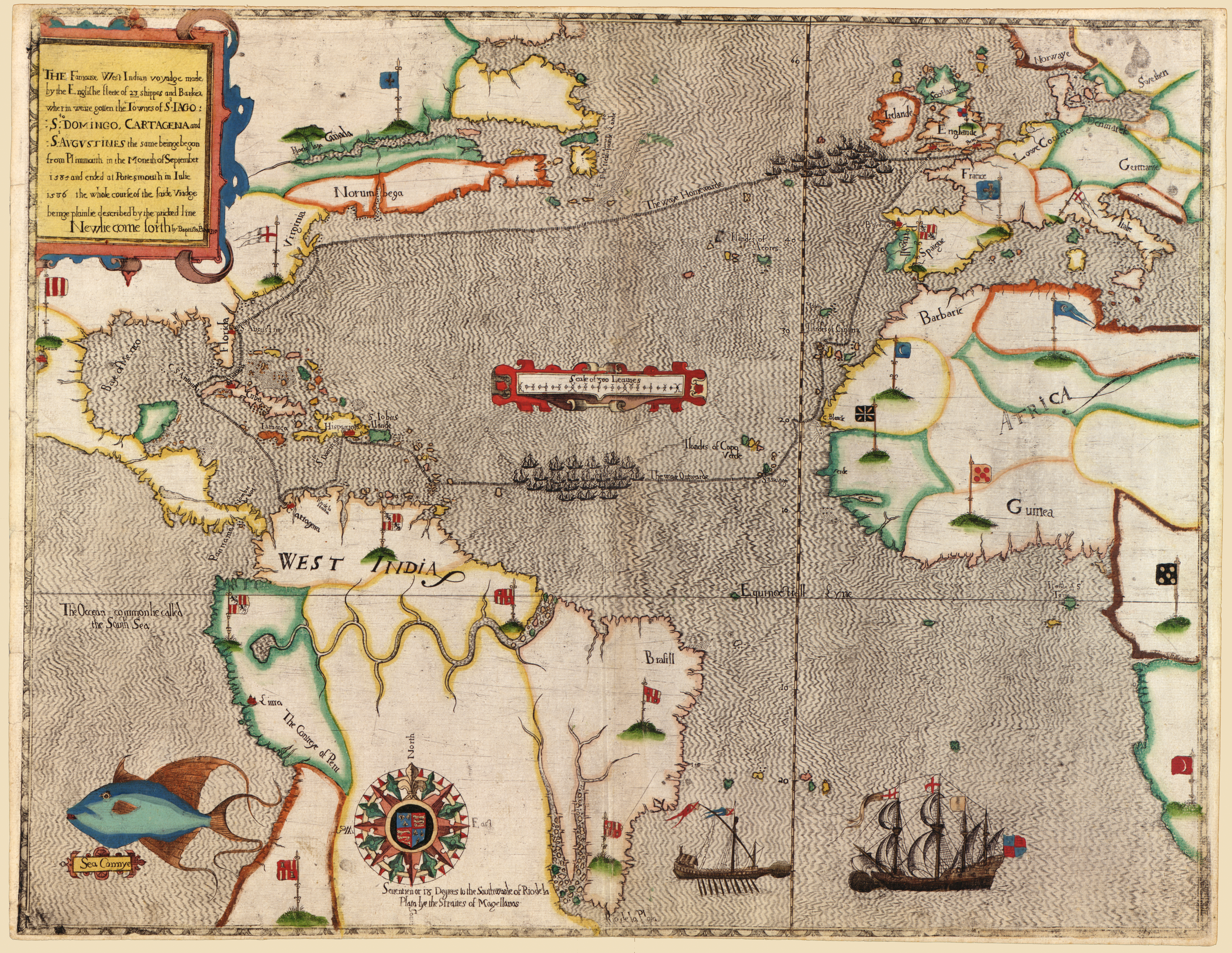
A map of Drake's voyage to the Spanish Main

=== Preparations ===
Governor Don Pedro Fernandez de Busto had been warned from a vessel that had sailed fast from the recently sacked city of Santo Domingo that his city would be next. He decided that all value was to be transported inland, while the city itself was evacuated of all non-combatants. Don Pedro Fernandez called for reinforcements from other nearby settlements and the militia of Cartagena was mustered and defences were prepared. The English fleet after leaving Santo Domingo sailed parallel along the New Granadan coast towards Cartagena. Drake knew that the coast was a treacherous one and a dangerous place to land sailors let alone soldiers.

=== Cartagena de Indias ===
Cartagena lay on the coast and it was well protected from an attack on its seaward side. Between Cartagena and the mainland, a seawater-filled moat had been dug, crossed by the fortified bridge of San Francisco. To the east swampland separated the city from the jungle-clad hills of the mainland. The city itself lay on the base of a narrow S-shaped spit of sand called La Caleta, which divided the Outer Harbour from the Caribbean, and which ended at the Boca Grande Channel. De Busto decided to concentrate the bulk of his forces on La Caleta and ordered a line of entrenchments laced with sand-filled wine barrels to be built, to protect the city behind him which was virtually defenceless.

=== Defences ===
The naval defenses of Cartagena included two well-armed galleys crewed by a total of 300 men under the direct command of Don Pedro Vique y Manrique who also doubled as the governor's military advisor. He was assisted by his two subordinates, Captain Juan de Castaneda in the Santiago and Captain Martin Gonzales in the Ocasión, and a galleass which, although unseaworthy, was anchored in the harbour for support. These galleys would give supporting fire on La Caleta which was covered by the earthworks. On land a stone-built fort, El Boqueron with eight guns, was garrisoned by about 200 men under Captain Pedro Mexia Mirabel and guarded the passage to the Inner Harbour. The main defence consisted of a force of up to 570 regulars and militia which protected the city itself (100 of them being pikemen), supported by a troop of 54 mounted lancers under the command of Captain Francisco de Carvajal, and a unit of as many as 300 Indian allies, equipped with bows and poisoned arrows. These were supported by a handful of Spanish regulars who served as officers and instructors.

== Battle ==
Drake appeared off Cartagena during the afternoon of 9 February 1586 and as the Boca Grande passage was unfortified, his ships passed through it in a long column, with the Elizabeth Bonaventure in the lead. The English ships dropped anchor at the northern end of the Outer Harbour after sailing past the entrance, just beyond the range of the Spanish guns guarding the Boqueron Channel. Drake sent Martin Frobisher forward to probe the defences using small boats and pinnaces in the afternoon. Coming in by way of Bahía de las Animas they moved forward but they soon ran into a chain of floating barrels which closed their way and in addition intense fire from El Boqueron forced their eventual withdrawal. Drake concurred with Christopher Carleil commander of the English troops that the best chance of capturing the city was by advancing up La Caleta.

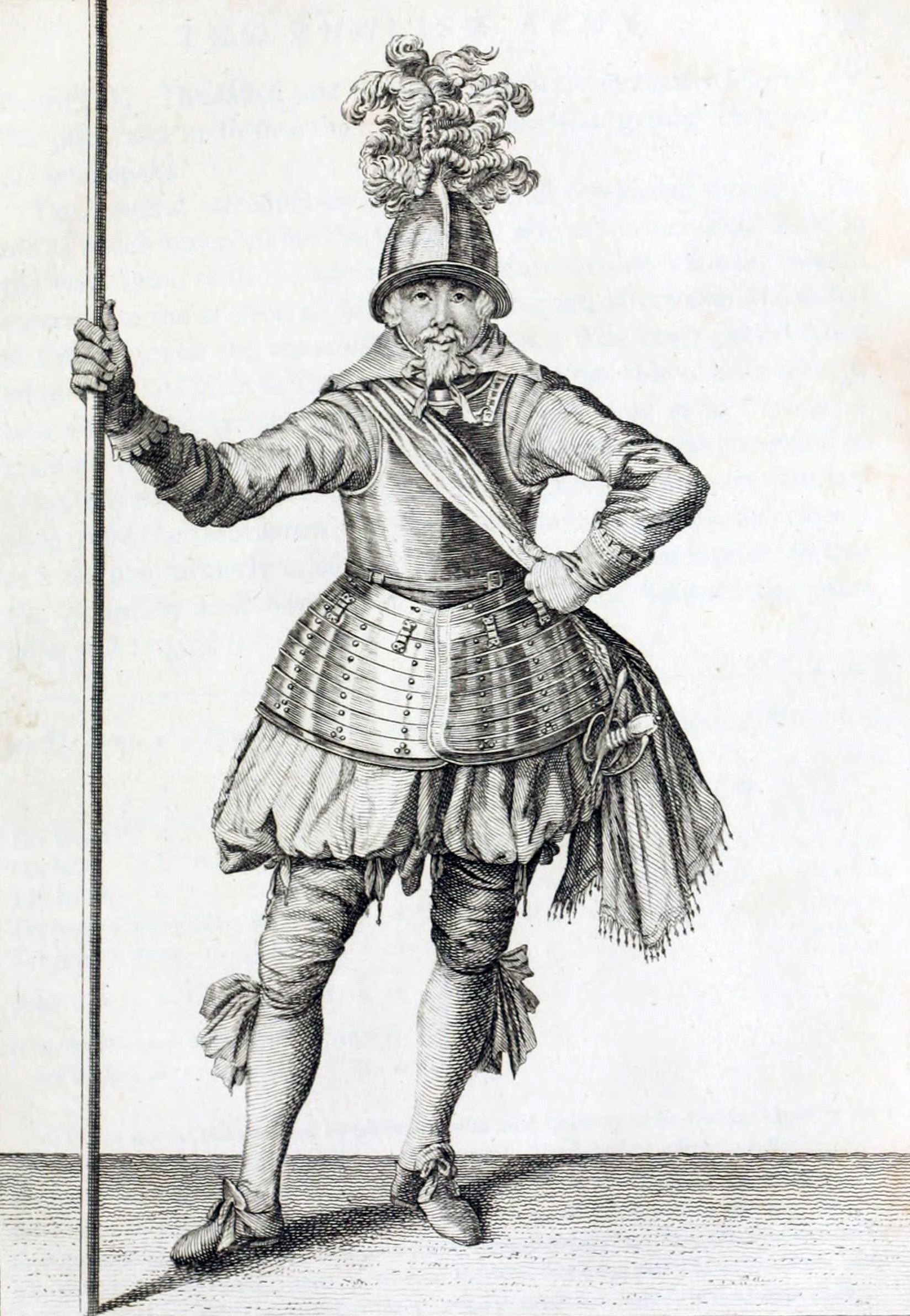
An English officer of Pikemen

=== Landing ===
Just before midnight on 9 February, the troops clambered into boats, and they were rowed across the Boca Grande Channel to a beach on the southern end of La Caleta. A few hours later on the next day almost 1,000 English soldiers and sailors were landed safely after Spanish sentries were surprised and killed. They also avoided the poisoned-tip stakes which the Spanish had put up. The English troops formed themselves up into attack columns and by wading through the surf as the tide was out they were able to bypass the outer defences; Drake meanwhile organized a naval diversion.

=== Assault ===
As the English moved to the Spanish positions a battery of four heavy guns covered the approaches, and Carleill could see the two Spanish galleys moving into position. At least 300 Spanish militia and 200 Indian allies lined the defences. The galleys began to open fire, joined by the defenders of the earthwork. Seeing the Spanish galleys firing too high, Carleill gave the order to charge, yelling 'God and St George!' and after some fighting in which the English pikemen pushed forward, they stormed the seaward end of the defences. Some of the English columns attacked the earthworks from the flank, rolling up the defences as they went. Any defenders were cut down where they stood, and the Spanish now routed fled into the city. Carleill and his men soon clambered over the city walls again pushing aside the defenders and they were now inside the city. They pursued the Spanish through the darkened streets and then were in the central plaza itself. Here the English reformed and then spread out into the city, pockets of resistance left were dealt with after they used the captured Spanish guns on their former users. The rest fled over the San Francisco bridge along with De Bustos but the battle was still not yet won.

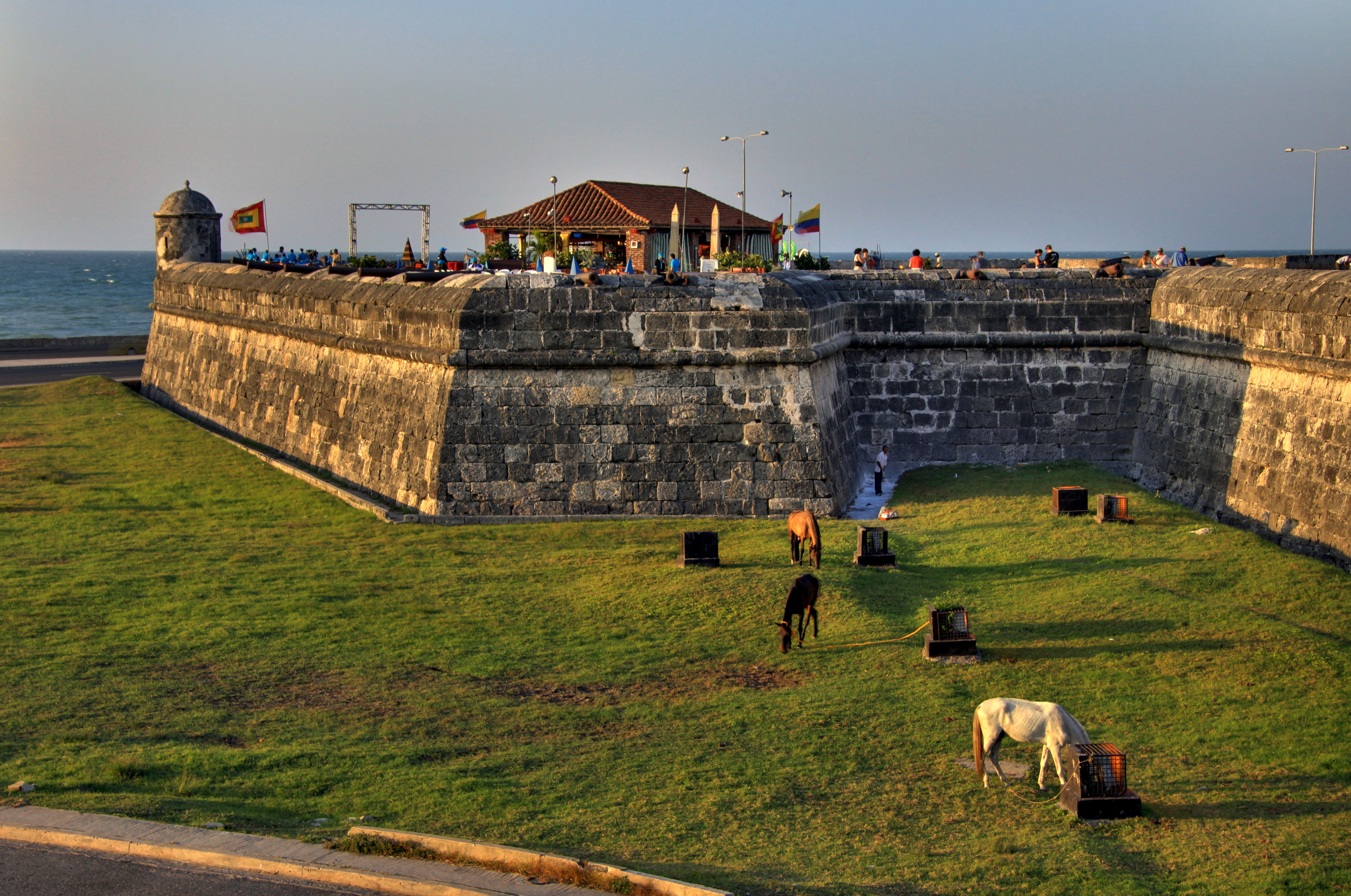
Present-day walls of old Cartagena de las Indias

=== Spanish collapse ===
Meanwhile, the two galleys and the galleass defending the Inner Harbour, and Captain Mirabel's garrison of El Boquerón were still in action. Don Pedro Vique on board the Santiago immediately drew in to the beach and landed at the head of a troop of cavalry, carried on board as a mobile striking force. The English however repelled this and Vique was unable to prevent the rout, and he and his men were forced back to their boats. Meanwhile, after the collapse of the defences, Captain Castaneda of the Santiago tried to support the defenders of the San Francisco bridge by landing troops. Most of his men simply joined the rout after the English threatened to cut them off, and he was then forced to beach his galley under the guns of El Boqueron, and was set alight. Captain Gonzalez of the Ocasion tried to cross the boom and escape into the Outer Harbour, but panic ensued after English cannon fire set the galley on fire and was also beached beneath El Boquerón. The Spanish from the galleys managed to flee along with their galley slaves; the static galleass was captured intact as English soldiers managed to surround it.

The fort of El Boquerón was the only Spanish defense still intact and this was bombarded from La Caleta and by the English ships which still lay in the Boquerón channel. Captain Pedro Mexia Mirabel and his defenders however slipped away the following night, which meant that by dawn on 11 February the city and some of its surroundings were in English hands. English sailors also managed to capture six ships that remained in the Inner Harbor the same day and the battle was over.

=== Results ===
Casualties were light on both sides; Carleill's soldiers had lost only 28 men, although at least 50 more had been wounded. Spanish losses were even less - a mere nine men killed with another 35 wounded. Drake had captured nearly 250 Spanish including many important men of the city, one of which was Alonso Bravo a Spanish captain who had surrendered in the town marketplace. Drake had captured more than sixty guns, and he immediately ordered his carpenters and gunners to repair their carriages, and to emplace them where they could to cover the landward approaches to the city. The Spanish galleass had been captured and the remains of the charred galleys on the beach were stripped of anything valuable.

== Occupation ==
Drake established his headquarters in the house of the wounded Alonso Bravo and he planned to hold the city until he could negotiate a ransom. Before he could do so, however, and despite Drake's orders to avoid looting, the English soldiers ran amok, ransacking houses and churches until Drake and his officers were able to get them under control. Drake then began by demanding ransoms from his prisoners, including Alonso Bravo; the two actually became friends and allowed Bravo to visit his dying wife. Drake's feeling of compassion eventually decided to decrease his ransom to just 600 pesos.

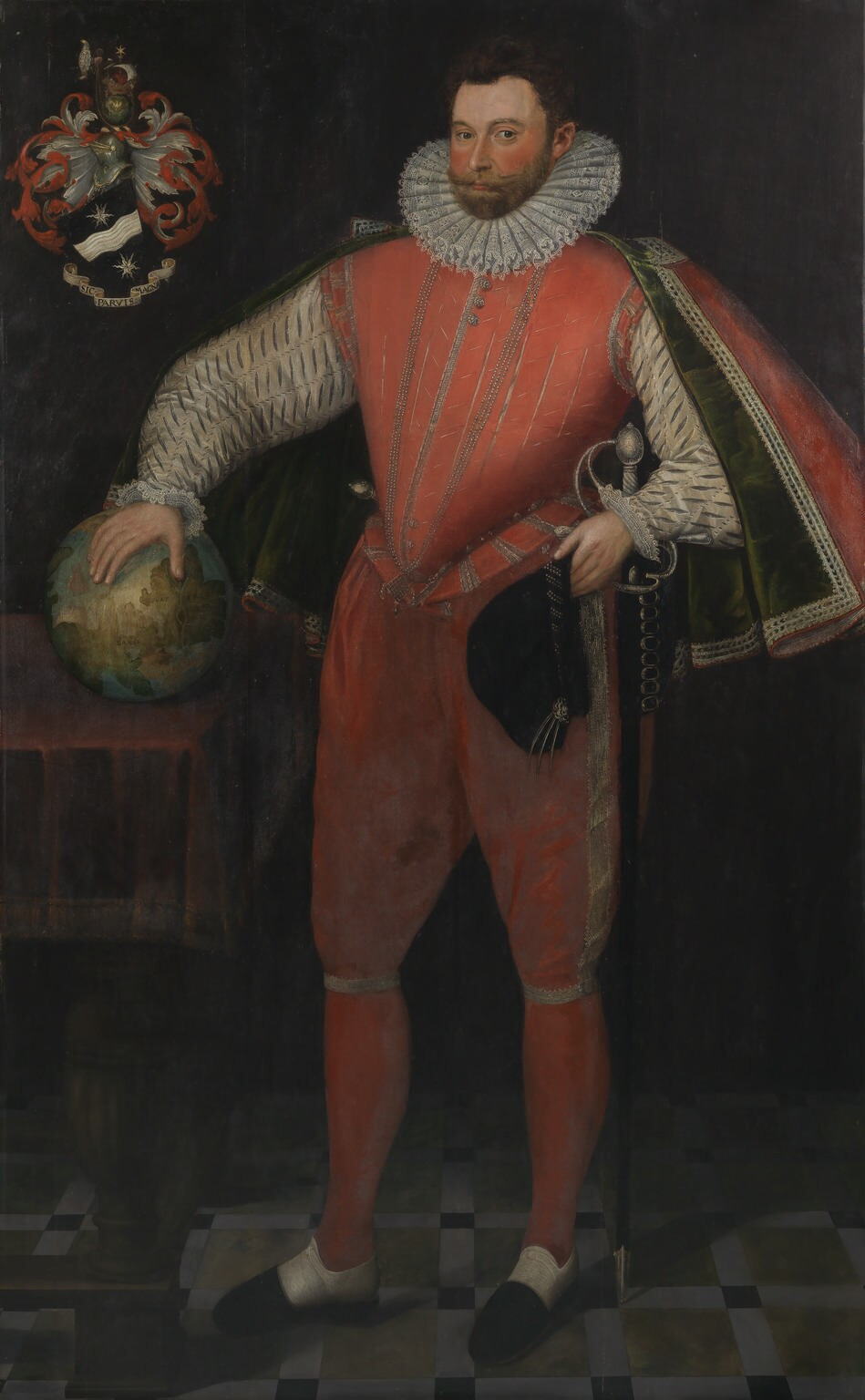
Francis Drake post 1580

=== Ransom ===
Formal negotiations began on 15 February and Governor Don Pedro Fernández was summoned to Drake's quarters, accompanied by his leading negotiator Father Don Juan de Montalvo, his deputy governor Don Diego Daca, and Tristan de Oribe Salazar, one of the city's leading merchants. As he had at Santo Domingo, Drake began by demanding a hugely inflated ransom of 400,000 pesos. The Spanish said they were willing to pay up to 25,000.

The negotiations were getting nowhere and frustration now led Drake to repeat his tactic from Santo Domingo, and so parts of the city were set on fire. Over a period of time 250 houses or public buildings were destroyed before the Spanish reluctantly offered a compromise, and a deal was finally reached. Drake was offered 107,000 pesos in return for sparing the rest of the city. Drake and his men also managed to extort all the smaller individual payments from the rest of the Spanish prisoners, of the kind he had demanded of Alonso Bravo. A total of 250,000 pesos was brought in, the majority of which had been gleaned from the Church. Drake accepted the governor's offer, and so for several days mule trains carrying silver and gold guarded by the English soldiers arrived in the town plaza.

=== End ===
On 27 February, Drake called for a council of war to decide what to do with the city. One suggestion was that Cartagena should be held by the English, and turned into a permanent English settlement in the heart of the Spanish New World. However they all agreed that the English crown would not tolerate the huge finance that would be involved. It was agreed that with a fever spreading rapidly and the ransom now completed it was decided to abandon the city as soon as the ransom was collected.

Drake and his men took whatever remaining goods they could, which could be sold for a profit on the voyage home. He embarked around 500 slaves, and took whatever guns he could fit into his ships, leaving Cartagena virtually defenceless. The official plunder was set at 107,000 pesos, while the private plunder was as much as 357,000 'pieces-of-eight' and the value of the guns, church bells, and other goods, meant that a respectable haul of 500,000 pesos was acquired.

== Aftermath ==
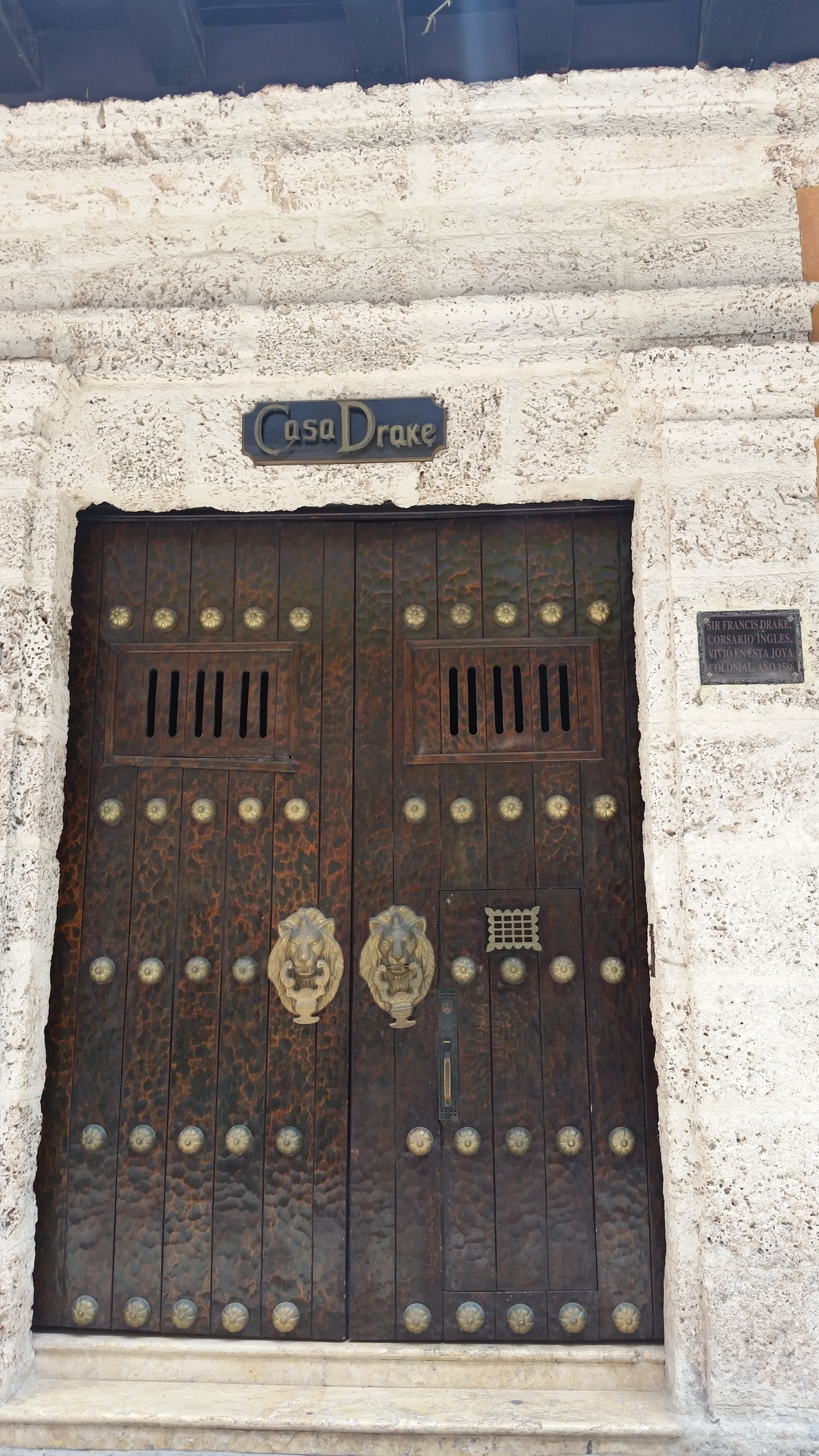
'Drake house' in Cartagena; Drake used this as his headquarters during the brief occupation in 1586

Drake finally sailed from the city on 12 April, after spending two months in Cartagena. The New Year Gift, a Spanish ship captured by Drake at Santo Domingo was abandoned, the vessel being sunk in the Boca Grande anchorage. Two days later a Spanish fleet arrived, sent from Seville to trap Drake but they were too late. Behind them the Spanish had to explain the debacle to their King and Don Pedro Fernández de Busto wrote:

I do not know how to begin to tell your Highness of my misfortune ... I can only say that it must be God's punishment for my sins, and for those of others.

The bulk of the official ransom had been paid using royal funds and it would take years for the city to repay the treasury, and to recover from the raid. Meanwhile, its defenses had to be rebuilt, its buildings repaired, and its citizens had to recover from the assault, disease, and financial ruin. Drake went on further to successfully attack the Spanish settlement of St. Augustine in May and then went on to find Sir Walter Raleigh's settlement much further North at Roanoke. Drake had become a name that reverberated around the Spanish Americas.

== Legacy ==
The popular cocktail drink of the mojito has its origins as a result of this raid. With fever becoming a problem amongst the English ships, Drake wanted a solution. After leaving Cartagena and sailing northwards a small boarding party went ashore on Cuba and came back with ingredients for a medicine which was effective, and so became known as El Draque. On 9 June the Spanish record in a document that when looking for Drake they found evidence that a small English party had landed 5 days earlier on 4 June. This is when they would have gathered the ingredients for the cocktail.

== See also ==
- Battle of Santo Domingo (1586)
- Raid on St. Augustine
- Battle of San Juan (1595)
- Battle of Cartagena de Indias

== Bibliography ==
- Bicheno, Hugh (2012). Elizabeth's Sea Dogs: How England's Mariners Became the Scourge of the Seas. Conway. ISBN 978-1-84486-174-3.
- Bradley, Peter T (2000). British Maritime Enterprise in the New World: From the Late 15th to the Mid-18th Century. Edwin Mellen Press Ltd. ISBN 978-0-7734-7866-4.
- Kelsey, Harry (2012). Sir Francis Drake: The Queen's Pirate (1st ed.). Yale University Press. ISBN 978-0-300-07182-5.
- Konstam, Angus (2000). Elizabethan Sea Dogs 1560–1605 (Elite). Osprey. ISBN 978-1-84176-015-5.
- Jaques, Tony (2006). Dictionary of Battles and Sieges: A Guide to 8500 Battles from Antiquity Through the Twenty-first Century. Greenwood Press. ISBN 978-0-313-33536-5.
- Marley, David (2005). Historic Cities of the Americas: An Illustrated Encyclopaedia. ABC-CLIO. ISBN 1-57607-027-1.
- Marley, David (2008). Wars of the Americas: A Chronology of Armed Conflict in the Western Hemisphere. ABC-CLIO. ISBN 978-1-59884-100-8.
- Sugden, John (2004). Sir Francis Drake. Penguin Books. ISBN 978-1-84413-762-6.
- Konstam, Angus (2011). The Great Expedition: Sir Francis Drake on the Spanish Main – 1585–86 (Raid). Osprey. ISBN 978-1-84908-245-7.
- Graham, Winston (1987). Spanish Armadas. Barnes & Noble. ISBN 978-0-88029-168-2.
- Tucker, Spencer (2012). Almanac of American Military History. ABC-CLIO. ISBN 978-1-59884-530-3.

=== External links ===
- History: Pauline's Pirates & Privateers: The First Sack of Cartagena
- The Caribbean Raid, 1585–1586
- The Assault of Drake
- Maratos, David. The El Draque Cocktail
