= Capture of Santiago (1585) =

Sacking of the Portuguese colony by Francis Drake

- Part of the Anglo–Spanish War
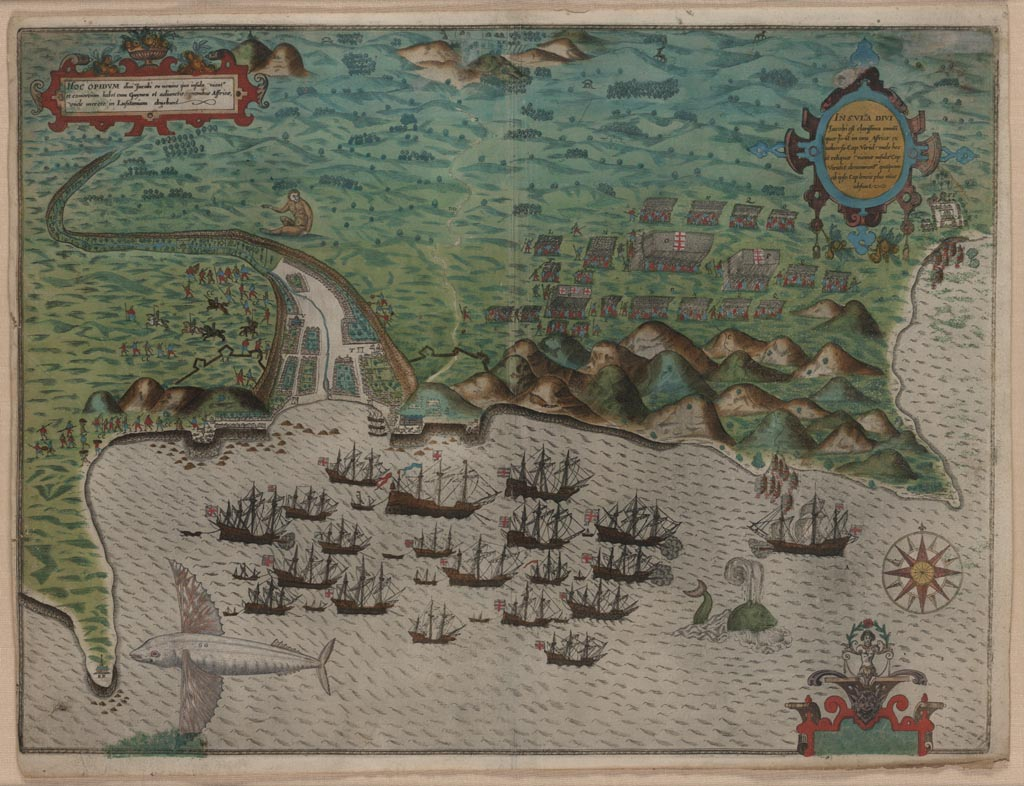
- Drake at Santiago, Cape Verde, 1589 hand-colored engraving, by Baptista Boazio, 1589
Date	11–28 November 1585
Location	Cidade Velha, São Domingos & Praia (Present day Santiago Cape Verde)
Result	English victory

Belligerents
Spain: Portugal under Philip of Spain	England

Commanders and leaders
Gaspar de Andrade	Francis Drake; Christopher Carleill

Strength
500 soldiers & militia 3 batteries	23 ships 1,000 soldiers & sailors

Casualties and losses
Light; 8 ships captured	2 killed

The Capture of Santiago was a military engagement that took place between 11 and 28 November 1585 during the newly declared Anglo-Spanish War. (Santiago is the largest island of the Cape Verde archipelago.) An English expedition led by Francis Drake captured the port town of Cidade Velha in the Cape Verde islands that had recently belonged to the Crown of Portugal. He sacked it and then marched inland before doing the same at São Domingos and Praia. Afterwards Drake left and continued his expedition to successfully raid the Spanish possessions in the Americas.

== Background ==
War had already been declared by Philip II of Spain after the Treaty of Nonsuch in which Elizabeth I had offered her support to the rebellious Protestant Dutch rebels. The Queen through Francis Walsingham ordered Sir Francis Drake to lead an expedition to attack the Spanish New World in a kind of preemptive strike.

=== Expedition ===
The expedition gathered at Plymouth on 14 September 1585 with Sir Francis Drake in command of twenty one ships with 1,800 soldiers under Christopher Carleill. Sailing from Plymouth he first attacked Vigo in Spain and held the place for two weeks ransoming supplies. Drake however intended this to be a diversionary raid where it was hoped to trick the Spanish to think they were not heading towards the Caribbean, by doing this he had already made sure his presence was felt at Las Palmas in the Canary Islands. After taking on water from the undefended La Gomera island, he continued his voyage, heading south towards the former Portuguese Cape Verde Islands. By virtue of the Iberian Union, the Anglo-Portuguese Treaty of 1373 was in abeyance, and the commencement of war with Spain, Portuguese colonies and ships were now a target for the English.

=== Cape Verde ===
The Cape Verde Islands were a relatively poor archipelago that until 1580 had been Portuguese, but after was controlled by Spain. The town of Cidade Velha lay on the south-west side of the island of Santiago, the largest island in the Cape Verde archipelago and it served as a major base for Portuguese slaving operations on the West African coast, and was an exporter of both sugar and cloth. The town was protected by two batteries that covered the anchorage and a third was sited on lower ground to the west, covering the landward approach, in all totaling nearly fifty guns but the defenses were in need of repair.

Drake arrived off the islands in early November and set about planning his assault, in effect this would be baptism by fire for his men and a good rehearsal for future attacks.

== Capture ==
On the evening of 11 November, under cover of darkness Christopher Carleill's assault force consisting of nearly 1,000 men landed on a beach four miles to the east. There was no resistance and they set off on a night march towards the town.

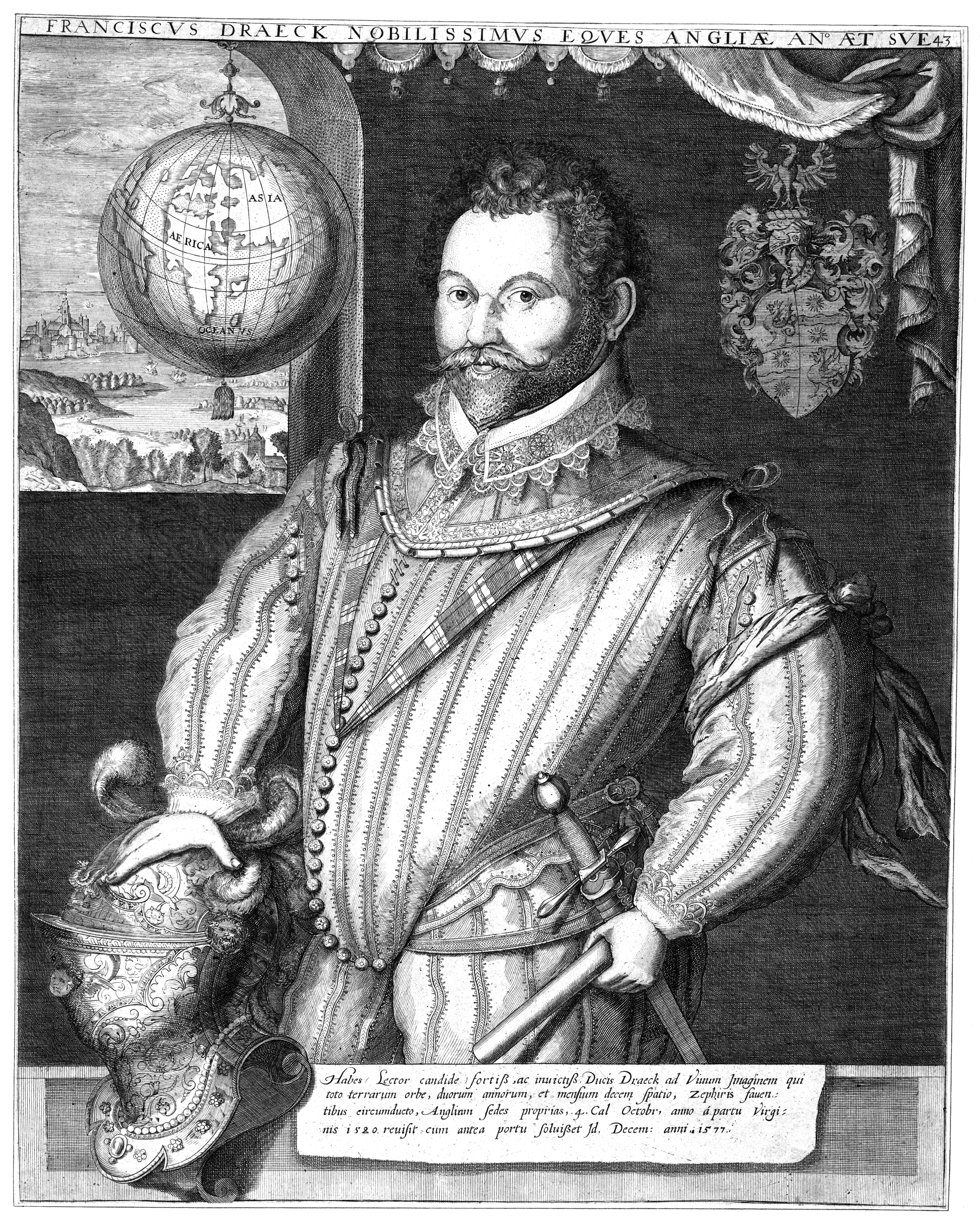
Sir Francis Drake

=== Cidade Velha ===
Drake's ships moved into position on the Queen's Accession Day and he ordered the firing of ordnance in her honor and began bombarding the town's defenses. The Spanish and Portuguese returned fire, but their firing was sporadic, and it soon petered out while Carleill's men stormed the batteries and took the guns. The inhabitants were fleeing out of the town and then the English stormed down the hill and into the empty town; the only inhabitants who remained were a few elderly residents, and twenty six patients with fever in the slave hospital.

By dawn the Cross of St George was flying over the town, Drake's men looted what they could and captured seven Portuguese slave ships lying at anchor off the town, one of which was added to the fleet, while the rest were stripped of anything of value. Also captured was a caravel being built in a shipyard but the English upon their discovery of it disassembled the vessel. Old bronze Portuguese and Spanish guns and equipment were taken from the batteries, in addition gun powder, silk, and cloth were seized from the town's warehouses. The houses were ransacked for food and the grove stripped of their fruit before finally, the bronze bells from the town's cathedral were taken.

Drake set up his headquarters and sent emissaries to track down some of the inhabitants, as he planned to hold the town and burn it unless the island's governor paid him a ransom. After a number of days however there was no response, so Drake rounded up the prisoners he had captured and interrogated them. The few that Drake held told him that the governor Gaspar de Andrade was in the nearby village of São Domingos, a few miles inland so an expedition was prepared.

=== São Domingos ===
Drake and Carleill led a force of 600 men in a trek into the dry and arid hills of Santiago island. The inhabitants of São Domingos fled when the English approached, so Drake and his men looted what little they could, then burned the village to the ground. Drake's force returned to the coast, shadowed as they went by local militia; two English stragglers were intercepted, killed and mutilated.

On 28 November, Drake made one last attempt to force the Spanish governor to pay a ransom; he was aware of a small settlement called Praia and so had plans to seize that too.

=== Praia ===
Drake sent Carleill on another expedition nine miles along the coast to the east, until he reached Praia.

Carleill's arrival coincided with the appearance of Drake and the fleet off the town's beach at dawn the following morning. The 1,000 or so inhabitants fled to safety, leaving Drake in control of the town who ordered it to be razed to the ground, sparing only the town hospital, but the plunder was scarce and then set back to Santiago.

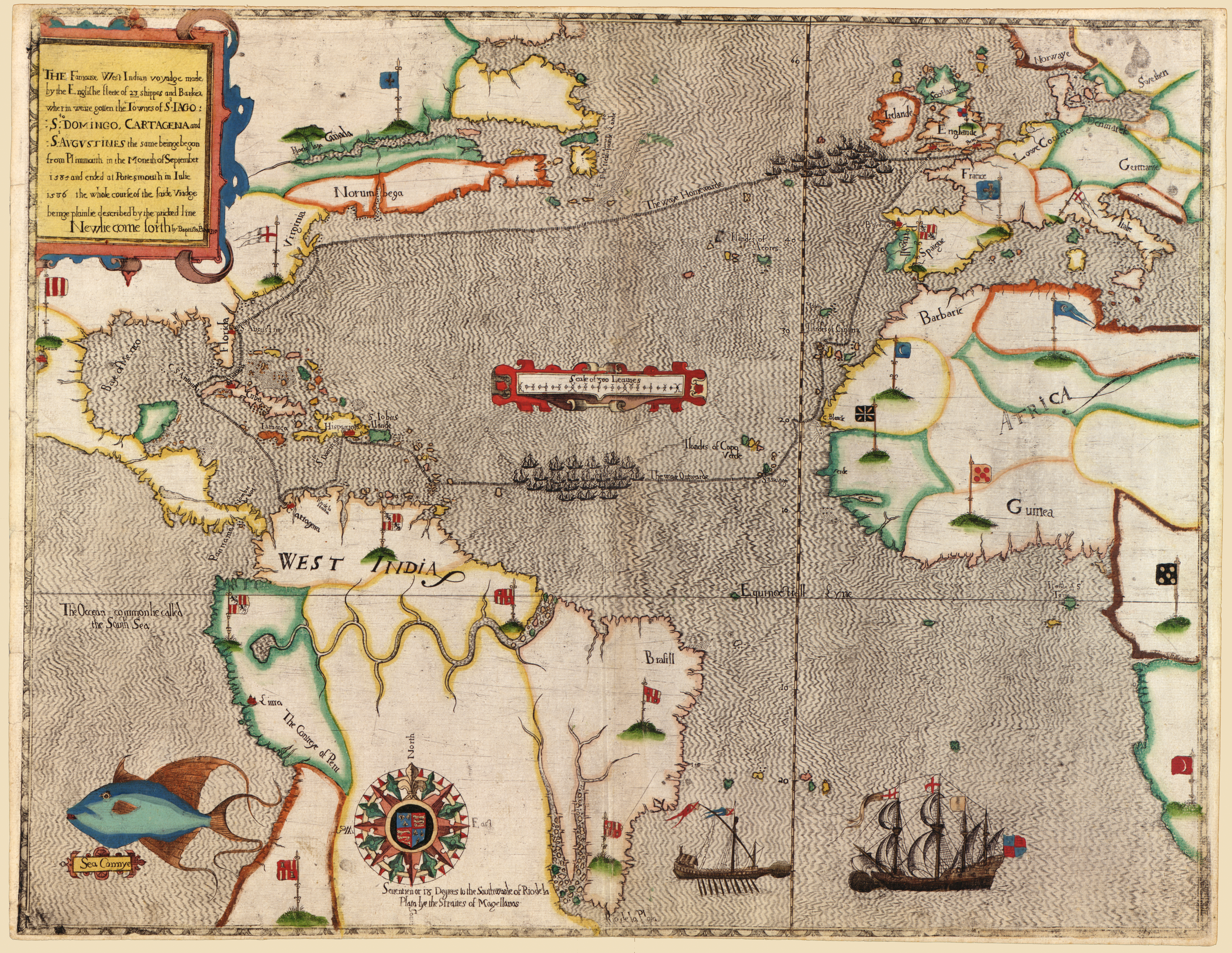
Drakes voyage to the West Indies showing the raid at Santiago

Drake left within a day of the capture of Porto Praia, but before he did so he ordered Cidade Velha to be razed as a final message to governor and the Spanish.

== Aftermath ==
On the last day of November, his ships then headed westward, out into the Atlantic Ocean heading towards the Caribbean and the Americas mainland to strike at Spain's New World empire. Although many in the fleet had succumbed to tropical illnesses, this was achieved spectacularly in three separate blows, firstly at Santo Domingo, Cartagena de Indias, and finally at St. Augustine.

After the raids he then went on to find Sir Walter Raleigh's settlement much further North at Roanoke which he replenished and took back with him a few colonists. He finally reached England on July 22, when he sailed into Portsmouth, England to a hero's welcome.

After Drake and the English had left, the Spanish and Portuguese after the attack strengthened the defenses and soon by 1590 Fort Real de São Filipe was built which still stands today.

== See also ==
- Battle of Santo Domingo (1586)
- Battle of Cartagena de Indias (1586)
- Raid on St. Augustine
