= Raid on St. Augustine =

Anglo-Spanish military conflict in 1586

- Part of the Anglo–Spanish War
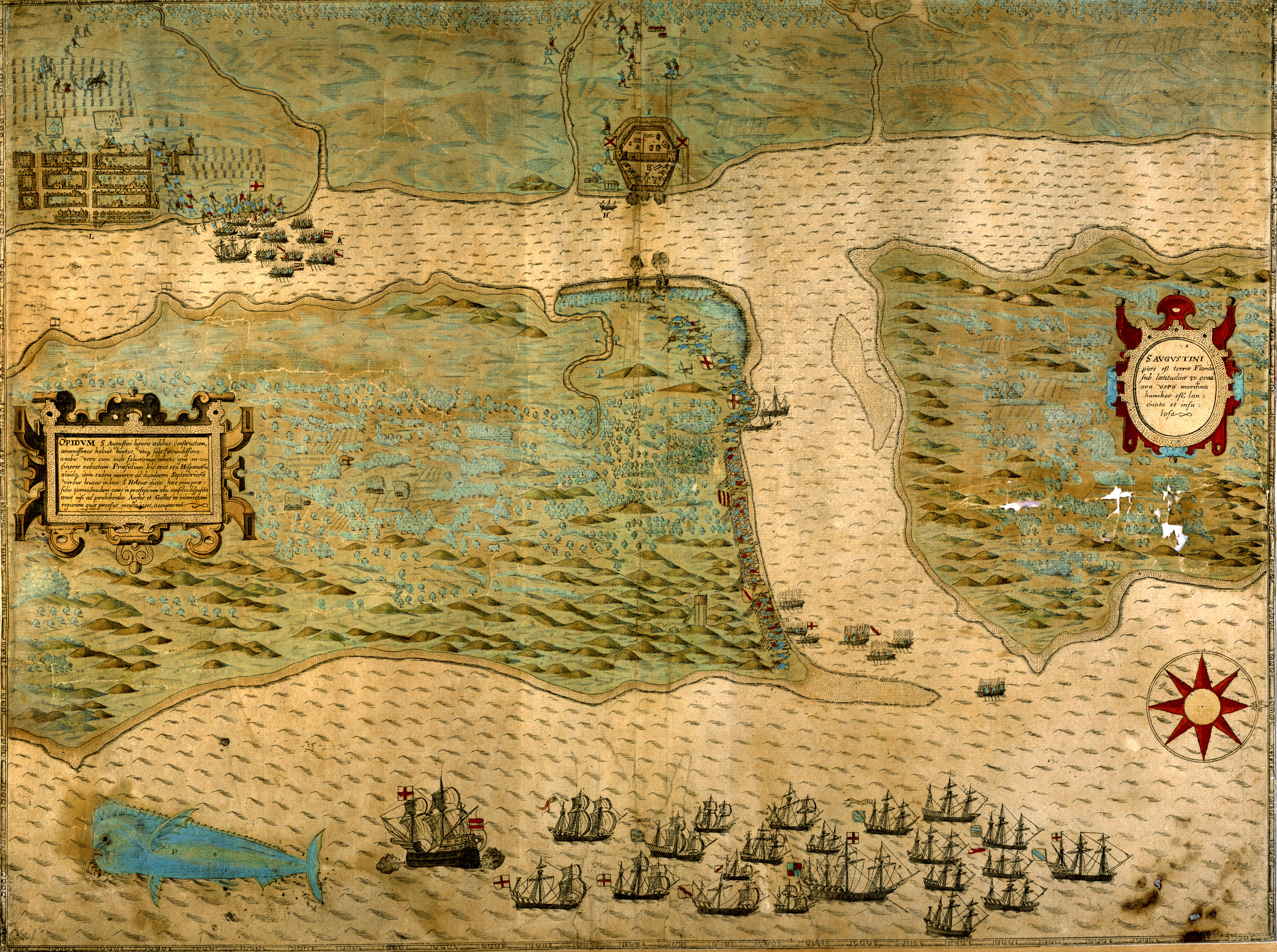
- Sir Francis Drake in St. Augustine 1586 hand-colored engraving, by Baptista Boazio, 1589
Date	27 May 1586; 440 years ago
Location	St. Augustine, Florida (Region of the Spanish Main)
Result	English victory
Territorial changes	Parris and Santa Elena Islands abandoned

Belligerents
Spain: Apalachee Indians	England

Commanders and leaders
Governor Pedro Menéndez de Márquez	Sir Francis Drake; Christopher Carleill

Strength
100 soldiers & militia Unknown number of Indians; 2 forts	23 ships, 19 support vessels & prizes, 1,000 troops

Casualties and losses
35 killed or wounded	Light

The Raid on St. Augustine was a military event during the Anglo-Spanish War in which the Spanish settlement of St. Augustine in Florida (Spanish: San Agustín) was captured in a small fight and burnt by an English expedition fleet led by Sir Francis Drake. This was part of Sir Francis Drake's Great Expedition and was his last engagement on the Spanish Main before he headed north for the Roanoke Colony. The expedition also forced the Spanish to abandon any settlements and forts in present-day South Carolina.

== Background ==
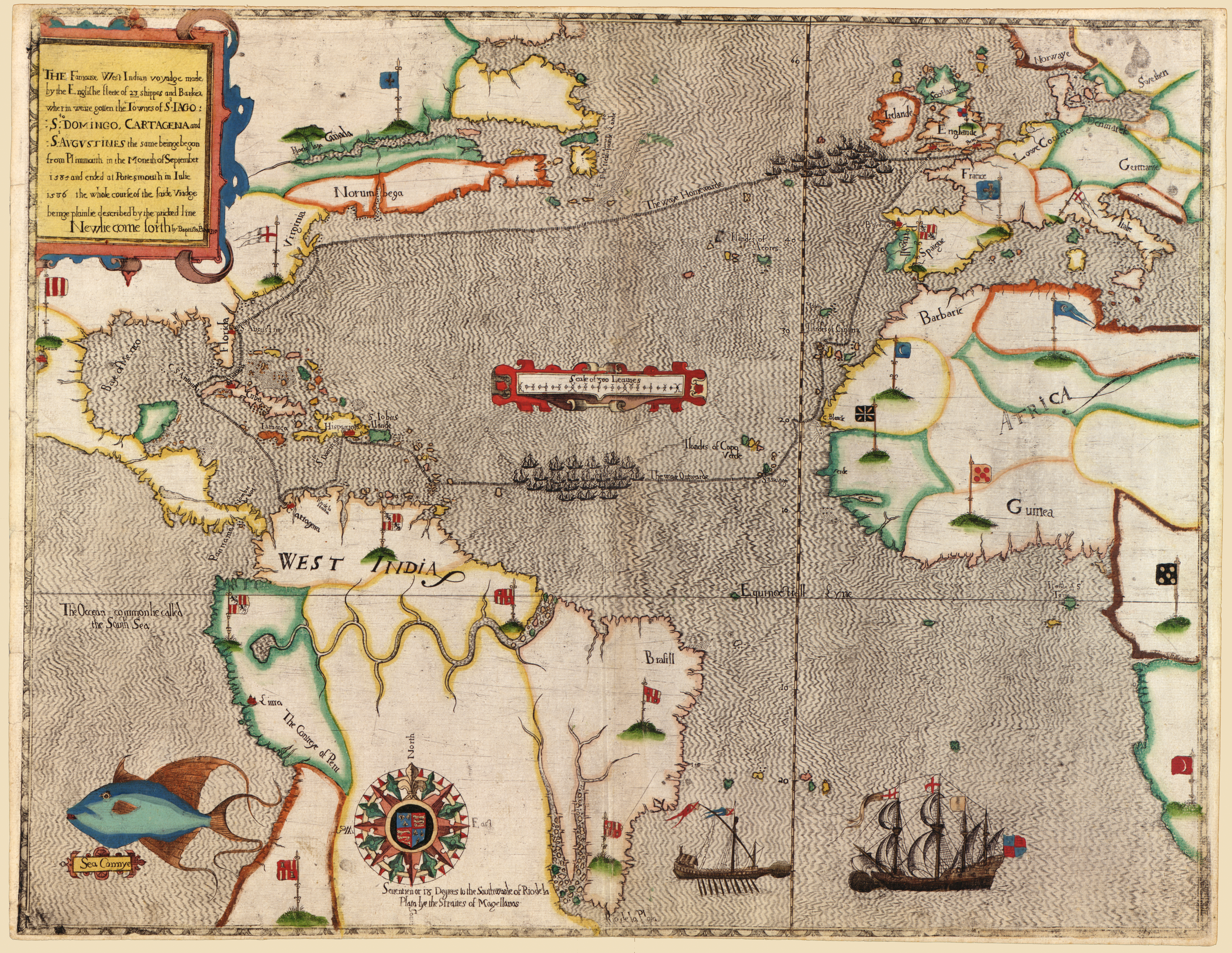
A map of Drake's voyage to the Spanish Main

War had already been unofficially declared by Philip II of Spain after the Treaty of Nonsuch in which Elizabeth I had offered her support to the rebellious Protestant Dutch rebels. The Queen through Francis Walsingham ordered Sir Francis Drake to lead an expedition to attack the Spanish New World colonies in a kind of preemptive strike. Sailing from Plymouth, England, in November 1585 he struck first at Santiago in the Cape Verde islands off the northwest coast of Africa, then across the Atlantic at the Spanish colonial city of Santo Domingo which was captured and ransomed on 1 January 1586; following that he successfully attacked the important city of Cartagena on 19 February.

Drake wanted to strike at another Spanish colonial city on the Spanish Main before finally visiting and replenishing Sir Walter Raleigh's new colony of Roanoke on the American east coast. After this he hoped to make the transatlantic crossing back to England. The fleet headed north, and in late April Drake put into the Spanish Cuban mainland where his men dug wells in search of fresh water and gathered supplies to help counter an outbreak of dysentery, then he moved on.

The fleet traveled north within sight of land on the Florida peninsula sailing past its eastern coast. On 27 May 1586 as they approached further north a small fort was spotted on the shore, with a small inlet close by. This was the location of St Augustine, the most northerly town in Spain's New World Empire. Drake knew of the place and was also aware of the fact that the Spanish under Pedro Menéndez de Avilés had ordered all of the French Huguenot colonists that had tried to settle in the area executed. Drake decided on one final opportunity to raid and plunder, and a chance to avenge his fellow Protestants.

== Capture ==
The English attacked and bombarded a small wooden fort in the sand dunes; the Spanish there fired only a few shots and fled. Drake sent a landing party to investigate, while Christopher Carleill, captain of the Tiger, and a few volunteers rowed a ship's boat into the inlet and saw no sign of any Spaniards. It sat on a strip of sand, separated from the mainland by a band of water, which entered into the inlet. A French Huguenot Nicholas Borgoignon, who had been taken prisoner by the Spanish six years before was found in a boat and agreed to guide the English to the Spanish settlement.

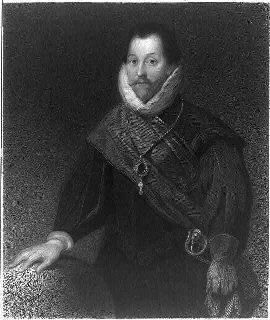
Sir Francis Drake

The Spanish governor of St. Augustine, Pedro Menéndez de Márquez (nephew of Pedro Menéndez de Avilés), was warned that Drake was off the coast, and he realized that with fewer than a hundred militiamen he could offer little in the way of resistance. The Spanish settlers withdrew inland and hoped to make surprise raids against the English gradually. Drake and his men occupied the area of the small fort but during the night Indians, native allies of the Spanish garrison, attacked. Drake and his men held their ground and within twenty minutes the Indians were repulsed with some loss.

The following day, Drake, Carleill, and around two hundred men advanced up the inlet in pinnaces and small boats, and they soon came upon the Spanish log stockade fort of San Juan. After a few shots by the Spanish, the English landed and took the fort with only a few losses. They found it deserted, as the Spanish had fled, but discovered an intact gun platform with fourteen bronze artillery pieces. They also found a chest containing the garrison's pay, about 2,000 gold ducats, which was inadvertently left behind in the retreat. Drake, knowing the Spanish had fled, began to plunder what he could; he took the guns, and burned the fort to the ground.

Soon the English came upon the main settlement of St. Augustine itself, this time they found it deserted. The Spanish, however, were just outside the town when Drake's men arrived, and they opened up a skirmishing fire. Anthony Powell, one of Carleill's officers, was killed in the opening shots as he tried to assault the outskirts. Carleill's men then charged all the way to the outskirts of the town into the scrub, forcing the Spanish to retreat, and leaving Drake in control of the settlement.

The English garrisoned the town overnight and the following day razed the whole of St. Augustine to the ground. All buildings were torched, crops were destroyed, and anything of value was either taken or destroyed. The fort of San Juan was burnt and all the artillery pieces were carried away by the English among other booty.

== Aftermath ==
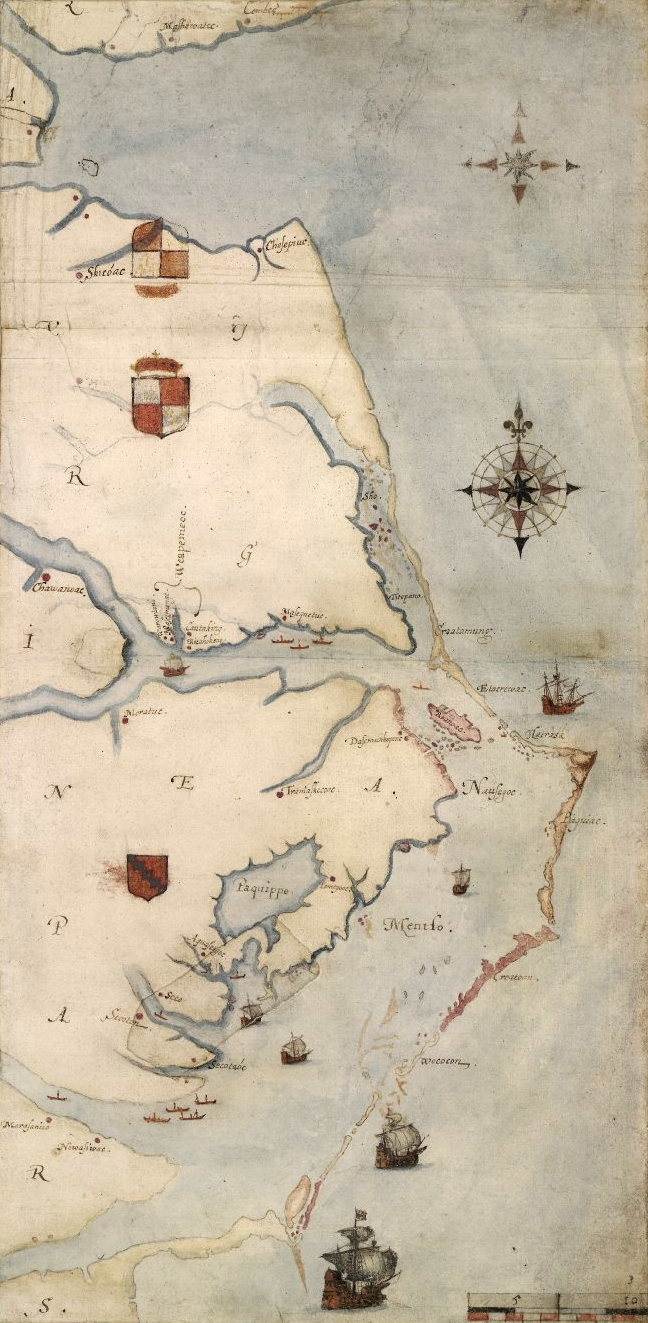
A 1584 map of the Roanoke colony

Once the English had gone Márquez and the rest of the Spanish settlers returned to find a smoldering ruins and very little left of their settlement. He soon begged for help from the viceroy of Cuba and the settlement took a while to build itself back up. The destroyed fort San Juan was replaced with another wooden fort. A masonry fortress to defend the presidio was not built until construction of the Castillo de San Marcos began in 1672.

=== Roanoke ===
Drake's fleet sailed from St. Augustine on 29 May, heading northwards up the coast, looking for signs of Raleigh's settlement. They cruised into what is now Charleston Harbor but found it deserted, then continued up the coast until they saw smoke. A boat was sent to investigate, and its crew finally made contact with the English settlers, who were encamped on Roanoke Island. Drake had no supplies but offered to take any of the settlers back to England; he sailed into Portsmouth on July 22.

Drake was greeted as a national hero upon his arrival in England; by that time news of his daring raids on the Spanish Main had reached most of Europe. His direct assault on the Spanish Empire was disastrous for the prestige of Spain and threatened the continued flow of New World riches, in the form of silver and gold, into its national treasury. The Spaniards, who called Drake El Draque, regarded him as a monstrous pirate. Drake's strike at the heart of the Spanish colonial empire embarrassed the Spanish king, Philip II, and hardened his resolve to invade and conquer England.

== Consequences ==
The consequences of Drake's raid were significant to the Spanish. Rumors soon began to spread that the English had a settlement further north and were using the place as a base for piracy. This was confirmed by news from released Spanish prisoners that Drake had wanted to replenish the colony of Roanoke. Although the Spanish knew of Roanoke they could not find the English colony despite a number of military expeditions sent out. Menéndez came the closest reaching 37 degrees latitude but failed to find anything.

Fearing another raid, and with the Spanish settlements on the American West coast being overstretched, undermanned, and underarmed; a crisis followed. Menéndez even conferred with the Council of the Indies in Seville (who received confirmation of St. Augustine's destruction by July) and Philip II, that all concentration should be in one place and that being at St. Augustine. Mendendez despite objections got his way and as a result Parris Island and Santa Elena were abandoned. This marked the end of the permanent Spanish presence in what today is South Carolina.

== Legacy ==
In the present day the events of Sir Francis Drake's Raid are recreated in June at St. Augustine. So far there have been 27 re-enactments and all are held in the old part of town. The re-enactment features an encampment, drills, weapon demonstrations, and more.

== See also ==
- Siege of St. Augustine (1702)
- Siege of St. Augustine (1740)
