= Giovanni Battista Boazio =

Italian draftsman and cartographer

Giovanni Battista Boazio or Battista Boazio (fl. 1588 – 1606) was an Italian draftsman and cartographer. He mapped Sir Francis Drake's voyage to the West Indies and America.

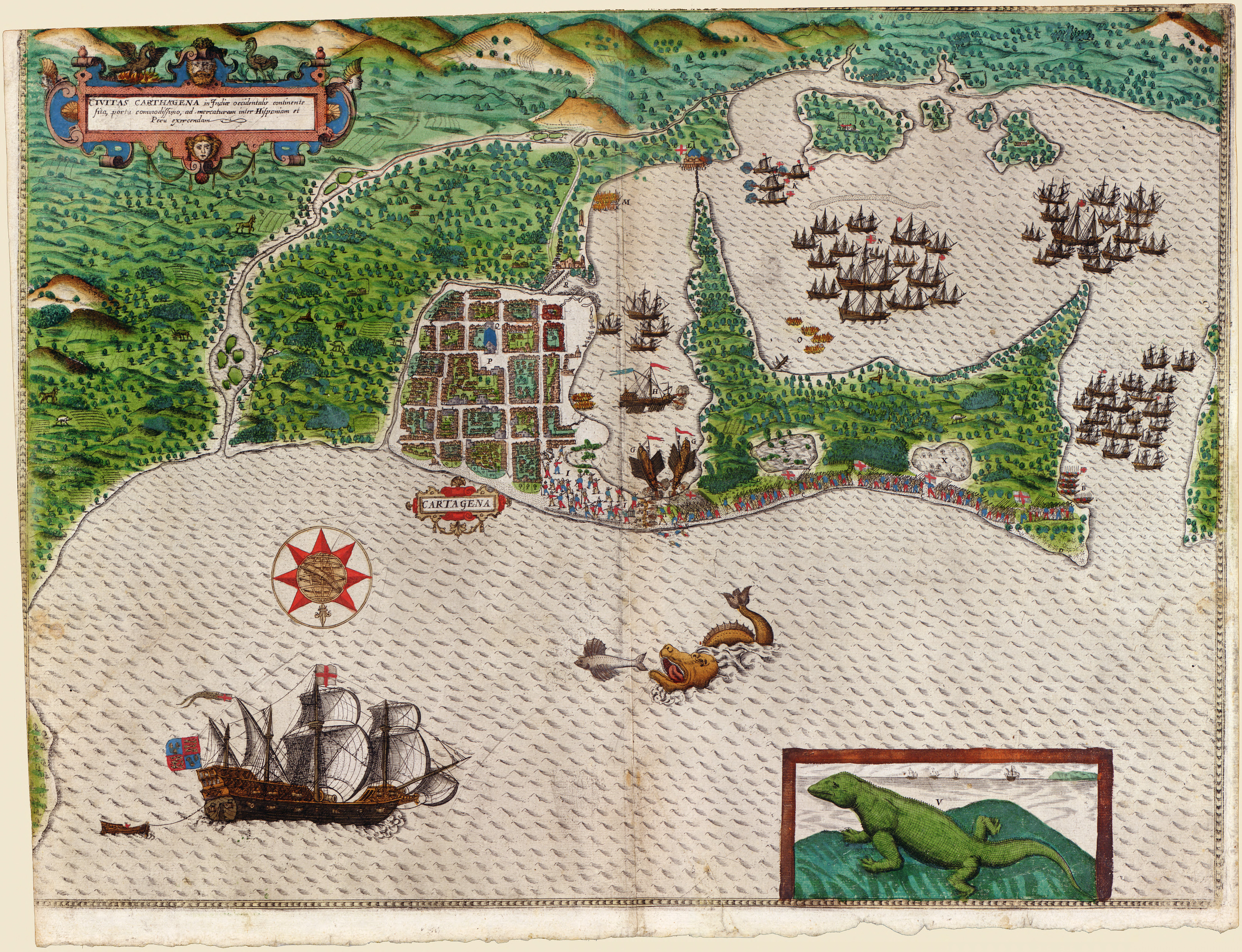
Sir Francis Drake in Cartagena.

He spent a long period working in England, and made a map of Ireland that was then used in the Theatrum Orbis Terrarum. He was sponsored by Robert Devereux, 2nd Earl of Essex to draw a map illustrating the Capture of Cádiz, which was engraved by Thomas Cockson. Other cartographic drawings includes Cartagena, Santo Domingo in the island of Hispaniola, Saint Augustine, Florida and the Cape Verdean island of Santiago, the Santiago engraving was one of the first to depict of that of any island in Cape Verde.
