= Timeline of Las Palmas =

Chronological timeline order of Spanish city

The following is a timeline of the history of the city of Las Palmas, Canary Islands, Spain.

== Prior to 20th century ==
- 1478 - Real de Las Palmas founded during the Castilian Conquest of Gran Canaria.
- 1485 - Roman Catholic Diocese of Canarias established.
- 1494 - Castillo de la Luz (fort) built.
- 1554 - Torre de Santa Ana (Las Palmas de Gran Canaria) (fort) built.
- 1570 - Las Palmas Cathedral built.
- 1578 - Torreón de San Pedro Mártir (fort) built.
- 1595 - Battle of Las Palmas.
- 1599 - Las Palmas attacked by Dutch forces.
- 1625 - Castillo de San Francisco (Las Palmas de Gran Canaria) (fort) built.
- 1689 - Iglesia de San Francisco de Asís (Las Palmas de Gran Canaria) (church) built.
- 1833 - Las Palmas no longer the capital of the Canary Islands.
- 1842
  - Palacio Municipal (town hall) built.
  - Population: 17,382.
- 1844 - Gabinete Literario founded.
- 1845 - Teatro Cairasco (theatre) built.
- 1854 - Miller & Co. in business.
- 1858 - Mercado de Vegueta (market) built.
- 1879 - Museo Canario (museum) opens.
- 1883 - El Liberal newspaper begins publication.
- 1890
  - Teatro Pérez Galdós (theatre) opens.
  - Hotel Santa Catalina built.
- 1891
  - Mercado del Puerto de La Luz (market) built.
  - Las Palmas Golf Club formed.^{(es)}
- 1892 - Christopher Columbus monument erected.
- 1895
  - Diario de las Palmas newspaper begins publication.
  - Dog sculptures installed in the Plaza Mayor de Santa Ana.
- 1900 – Population: 44,517.

== 20th century ==
- 1902 - Santa Catalina mole built in harbor.
- 1909 - Real Club Victoria (football club) formed.
- 1910
  - Cine Sta. Catalina, Circo Cuyás, Pabellón Colon, and Pabellón Recreativo cinemas active.
  - Population: 62,886.
- 1911 - La Provincia newspaper begins publication.
- 1912 - Cabildo Insular de Gran Canaria headquartered in Las Palmas.
- 1914 - Club Deportivo Gran Canaria (football club) formed.
- 1927 - La Voz newspaper begins publication.
- 1930 - Gran Canaria Airport opened.
- 1940 - Population: 119,595.
- 1941 - Casa Palacio built.
- 1945 - Estadio Insular (stadium) opens.
- 1948
  - Archivo Histórico Provincial de Las Palmas (archives) established.
  - Arsenal of Las Palmas formally established.
- 1949 - UD Las Palmas (football team) formed.
- 1952 - Jardín Botánico Canario Viera y Clavijo (garden) founded.
- 1956 - Real Club de Golf de Las Palmas course built.
- 1970 - Population: 287,038.
- 1981 - Population: 366,454.
- 1982 - Canarias7 newspaper begins publication.
- 1987 - CB Gran Canaria (basketball club) active.
- 1989 - University of Las Palmas de Gran Canaria established.
- 1997 - Alfredo Kraus Auditorium built.

== 21st century ==
- 2003 - Estadio Gran Canaria (stadium) opens in Siete Palmas.
- 2007 - Jerónimo Saavedra becomes mayor.
- 2011 - Population: 381,271.
- 2014 - Gran Canaria Arena opens.
- 2015 - Augusto Hidalgo becomes mayor.

== See also ==
- History of Las Palmas
- List of mayors of Las Palmas
- List of municipalities in the Canary Islands

== Bibliography ==
=== in English ===
- "Las Palmas" . Encyclopædia Britannica. Vol. 16 (11th ed.). 1910. p. 235.
- "Las Palmas", The Mediterranean: Seaports and Sea Routes, including Madeira, the Canary Islands, the Coast of Morocco, Algeria, and Tunisia, Leipzig: Karl Baedeker, 1911, OCLC 490068
- "Guide to Grand Canary: Las Palmas". Brown's Madeira, Canary Islands and Azores: a Practical and Complete Guide (11th ed.). London: Sampson, Low, Marston & Co. 1913. hdl:2027/mdp.39015058338768.

=== in Spanish ===
- Fernando Gabriel Martín Rodríguez (1978), La arquitectura del Ayuntamiento de Las Palmas (in Spanish)
- Saro Alemán Hernández (2008), Las Palmas de Gran Canaria, Ciudad y Arquitectura (1879-1939) (in Spanish)
