= Borburata =

Small coastal town in Carabobo state, Venezuela

Coordinates: 10°26′38″N 67°57′46″W

Borburata is a small coastal town in Carabobo state, Venezuela, located a few kilometers from the Caribbean Sea. It was long a destination of indigenous peoples, who would gather salt at the sea. It was colonized by the Spanish in the 16th century, but suffered so many raids that it was mostly abandoned. Residents moved inland. Today, it has facilities associated with the Venezuela oil and gas industry.

== History ==
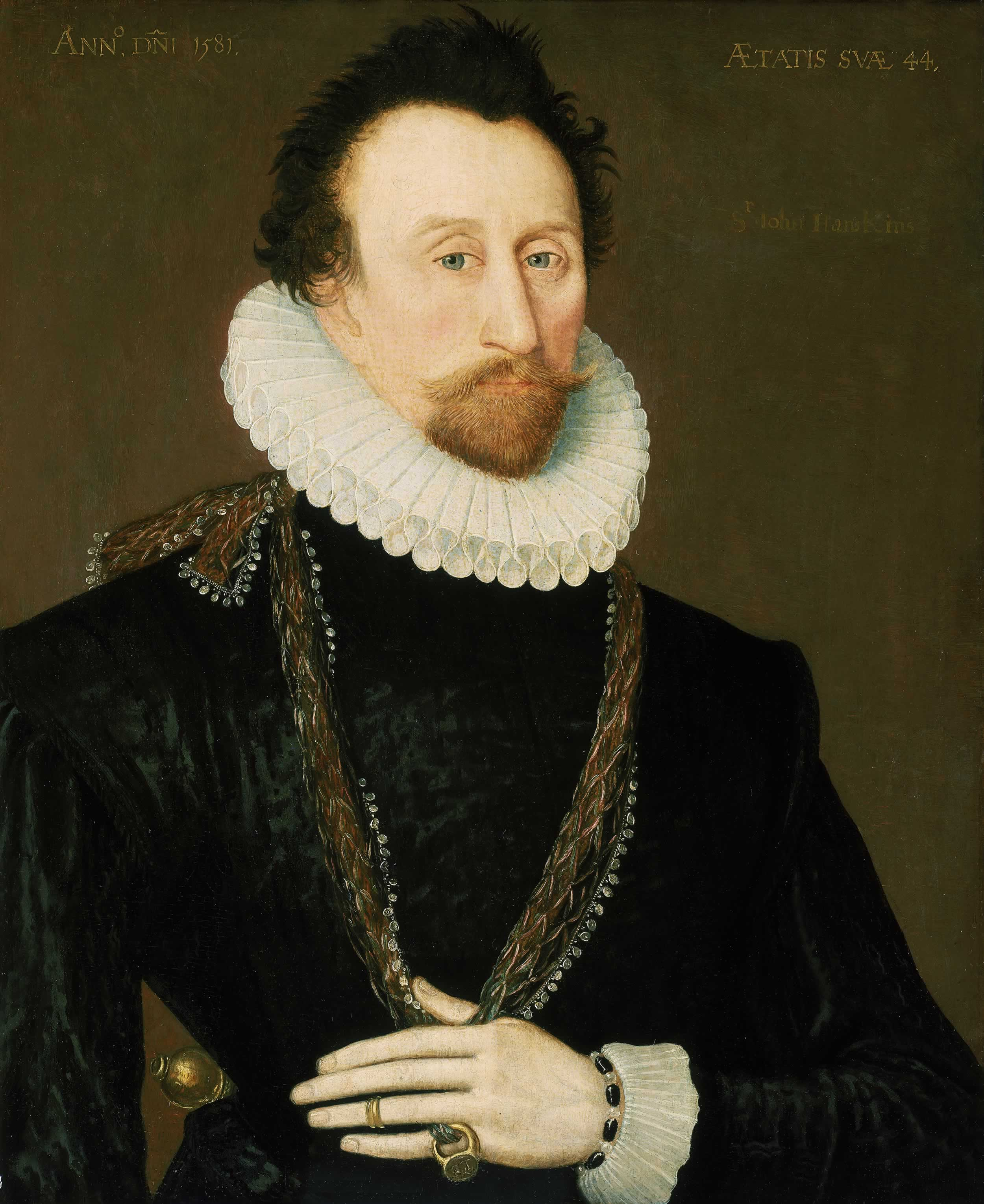
Sir John Hawkins raided Borburata at least twice.

For thousands of year, indigenous peoples occupied this area. Some came from the interior to gather dried salt. Historically, the Jirajara Indians traveled to Valencia Lake and through the mountains to reach the sea in this area to collect dried salt.

During 16th-century Spanish colonization the region suffered many attacks by French and British pirates.

- 1541: Felipe von Hutten of the House of Welser of Augsburg passed through the site on an entry he made from Coro towards the Llanos
- 1548: the explorer Juan de Villegas founded the town in 1548. During the late 16th and 17th centuries,
- 1555: French pirates led by Jean Sorel attacked Borburata for 6 days.
- 1561: Lope de Aguirre and his maranones attacked Borburata after plundering Isla Margarita.
- 1564: British pirates led by John Hawkins forced the Borburata settlers to buy his cargo of African slaves and goods despite the trade was prohibited. He carried out a fake threat of force with the local governor's collusion as part of the Triangular trade.
- 1566: John Lovell attacked Borburata. The young Francis Drake, who is also likely to be a relative of Lovell, was on the voyage.
- 1567: French pirates led by Nicolas Vallier invaded Borburata, and the residents had to abandon the town.
- 1568: John Hawkins and his second cousin Francis Drake attacked Borburata again, forcing residents to buy his cargo. This included some of the 400 Africans he had captured and enslaved in West Africa. After careen their ships Drake receives the command of the "Judith". Hawkins sails to Curacao and Ríohacha.
- 1569: the conquistador Pedro Maraver de Silva arrived at Borburata with about 400 colonists and their families in one of the last expeditions that sought to find El Dorado. They came above all from Extremadura. Most of these settlers abandoned it between Borburata and Valencia del Rey and decided to settle in the region. Malaver continued on his way with a hundred soldiers between the Llanos and the Andes.

The town of Borburata was eventually abandoned for a long period, and settlers moved to Valencia and Puerto Cabello. A day's walk from the Caribbean Sea, it was less likely to be raided.

== Contemporary ==
Today Borburata is best known for the PDVSA tank farm, part of the profitable oil and gas industry. The town is also known for its religious festivities. The San Esteban National Park located minutes outside the town contains a great variety of habitats, such as beaches, mangroves, coral reefs, and tropical rainforests, with corresponding diversity of wildlife and plants.

== Sources ==
- Sugden, John (1990). Sir Francis Drake. London: Barrie & Jenkins. ISBN 0-7126-2038-9. OCLC 20931112.
