= Drake Jewel =

Pendant owned by Sir Francis Drake

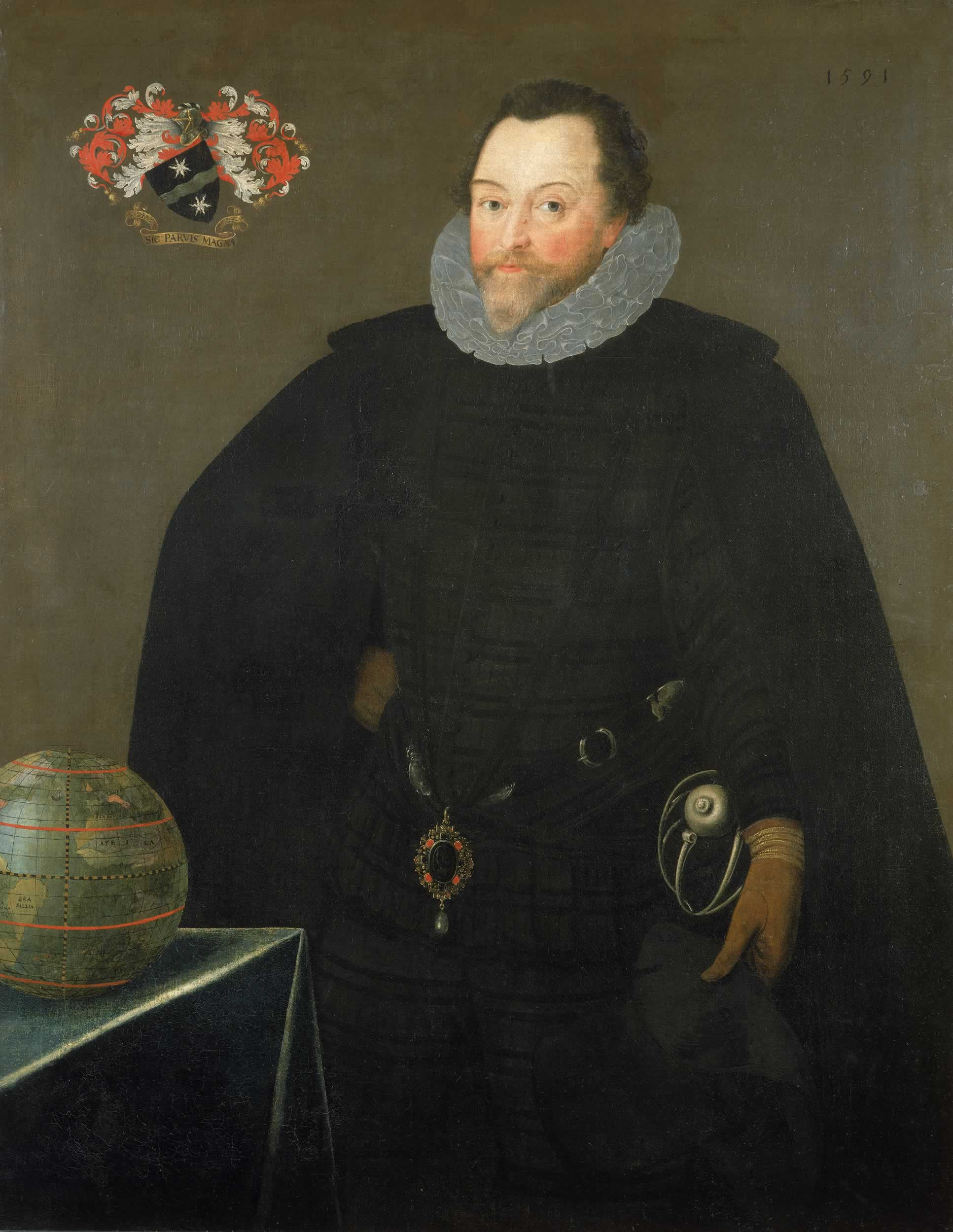
The Drake Jewel pendant hanging from Drake's belt, painting by Marcus Gheeraerts the Younger, dated 1591

The Drake Jewel is a precious pendant given to Sir Francis Drake by Queen Elizabeth I to show her gratitude. The pendant is on display at the Victoria and Albert Museum (V&A) in London.

== History ==
Elizabeth I had the pendant created especially for Drake, by a renowned artisan, as a demonstration of gratitude. Drake's Jewel was created by Nicholas Hilliard and given to Drake before 1591, possibly to celebrate England's victory against the Spanish Armada in 1588. Drake was painted by Marcus Gheeraerts the Younger in 1591 and is shown wearing the jewel. Drake valued this pendant more than any of his other possessions.

After Drake's death in 1596, the jewel passed to Thomas Drake, his brother, and upon his death in 1637, to Thomas's widow. According to the V&A, the widow sold the rights of ownership of the jewel in exchange for a payment to her daughters of £3000 (equivalent to £559,174 in 2025)

The jewel continued in the Family, and can be seen in the 1884 painting of Elizabeth, Lady Seaton (born Elizabeth Fuller-Eliott-Drake. The V&A record the jewel as being owned by Lt. Col Sir George Meyrick, whose cousin Captain Owen Meyrick was one of the beneficiaries of Lady Seaton's will.

== Description ==
On the front, the jewel shows a cameo of an African figure and a European figure standing side by side. The reverse opens to show a painting of Elizabeth I and a phoenix. The African figure is wearing a cape, which could be a paludamentum, cape of Roman commanders and emperors. The portraits are watercolour on vellum, surrounded by rubies, diamonds and pearls.

=== Interpretation of images ===
The images on the jewel are open to interpretation;

David Shields of the Omohundro Institute writes that the images suggest that the joint effort of the African and English will liberate the world from Spain, such as Drake's alliance with the Cimarron and Elizabeth's alliance with Ahmad al-Mansur against the Spanish. The Cimarron alliance connection was also noted by Miranda Kaufmann, Nikki Marmery and Duane Van Dieman. Historian John Sugden states: "One of the subjects is a white European, an Englishman or possibly even a woman. The other is a black African. There is no suggestion that one figure is superior to the other. They stand side by side, as equals, allies perhaps, or friends."

Karen Dalton, reinterpreting the concept of visual culture to the English Renaissance and defining the otherness of race, ethnicity and gender in the essay "Art for the Sake of Dynasty: The Black Emperor in the Drake Jewel and Elizabethan Imperial Imagery", writes that the jewel is a manifestation of the queen herself and of her imperial aspirations. The black emperor is Saturn the ruler of the Golden Age. The woman is the Virgin Astraea who will return Saturn to the throne. V&A also noted this interpretation. Kevin Jackson in Chronicles of London writes that the regal lady is presumably Elizabeth I herself and the African man is presumably a slave.

The phoenix in the jewel is one of Elizabeth I's most used images, depicting peace, rebirth and virtue.

== Gallery ==
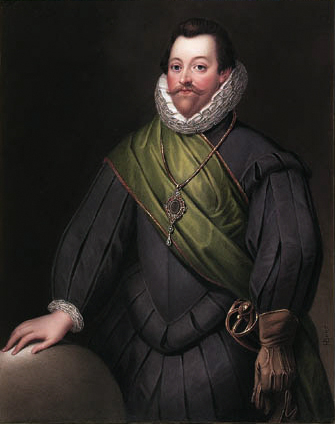
A portrait of Drake wearing the Jewel, by Henry Bone, dated 1829

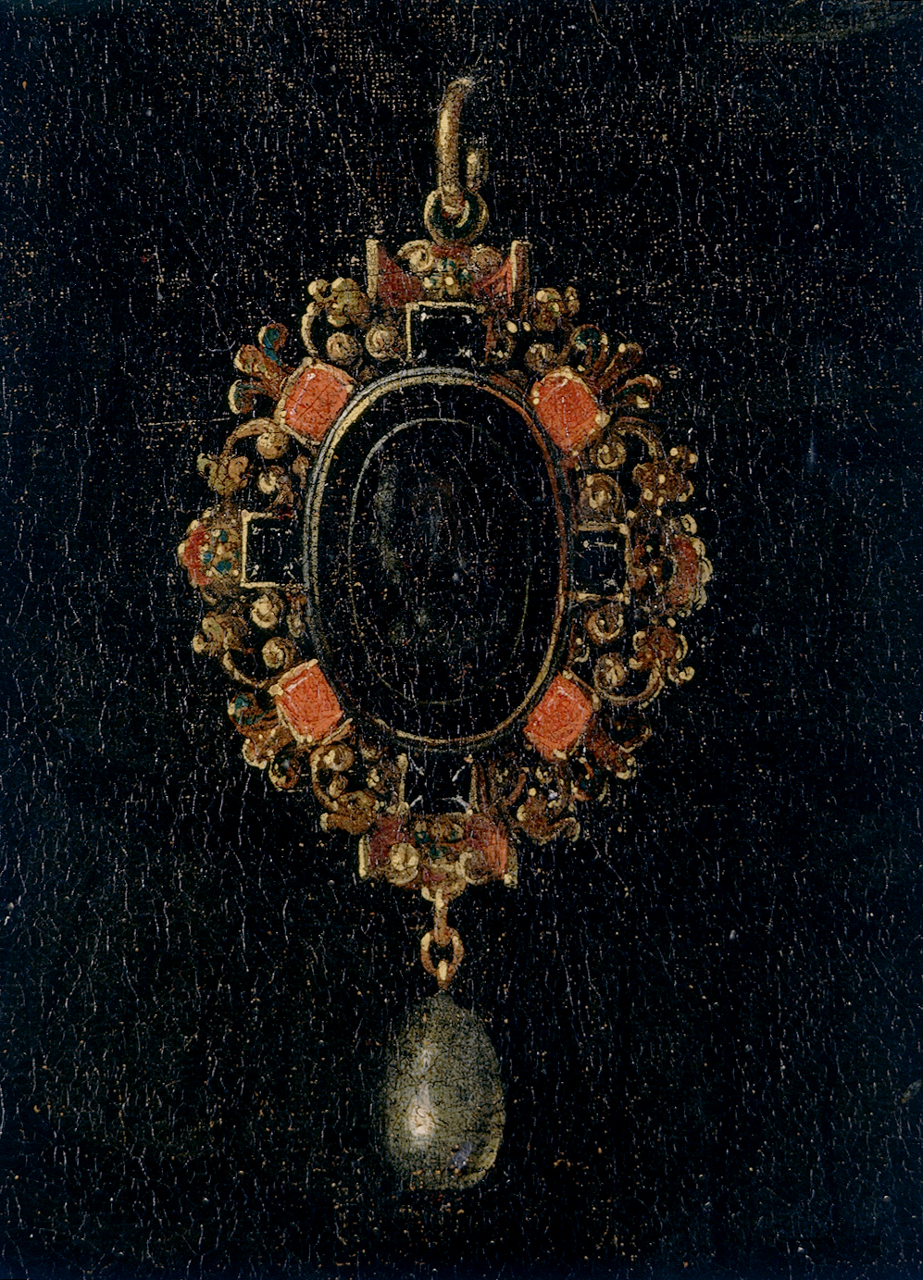
Detail from the Marcus Gheeraerts the Younger portrait

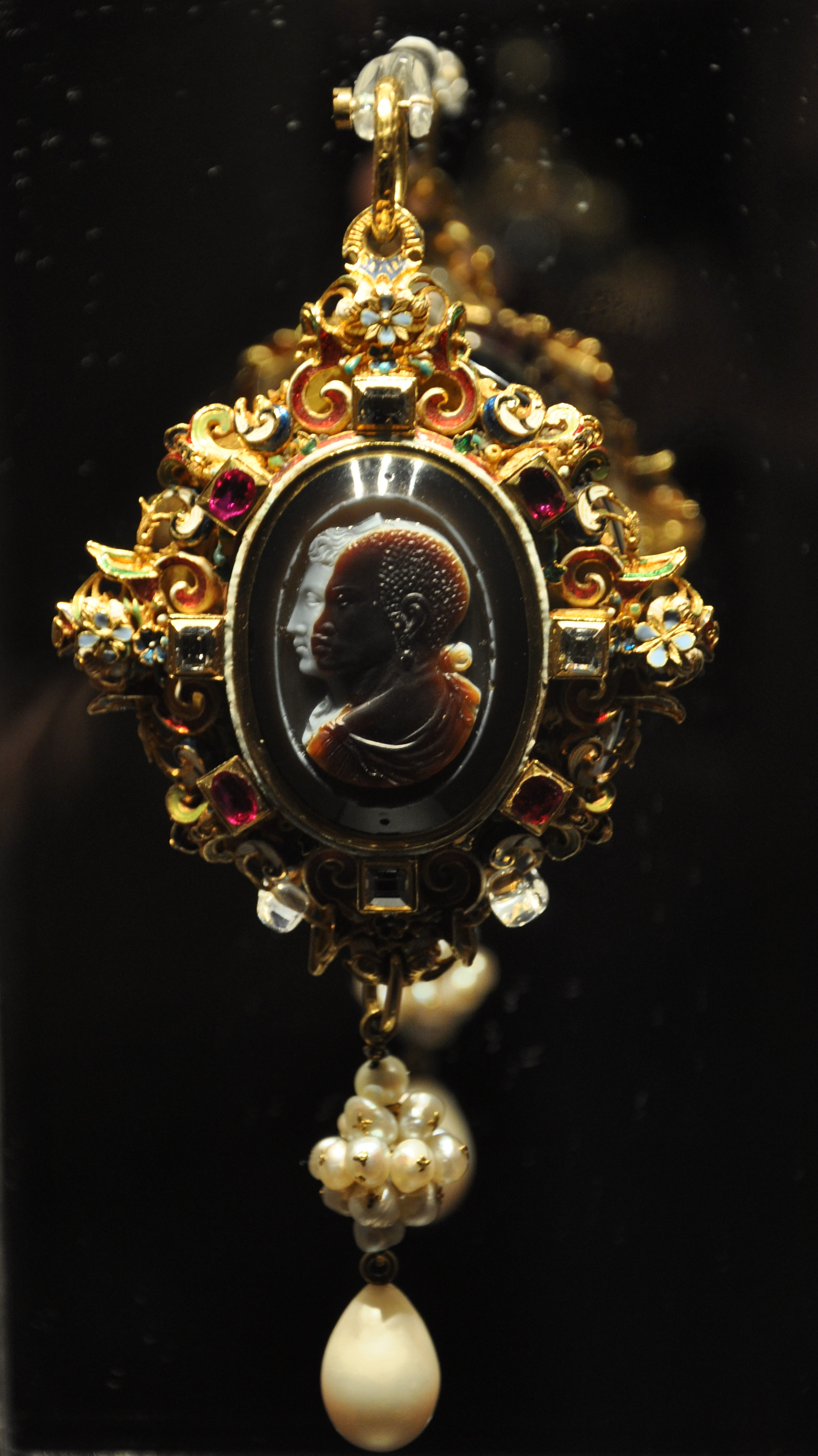
The pendant at the V&A museum
