= John Lovell (slave trader) =

English slave trader

John Lovell was an English slave trader. He lived in the 16th century, making him one of England's earliest slave traders.

== Slave voyage ==
Lovell was one of England's earliest slave traders. He was a relative of John Hawkins, who employed him to go on a slave trading voyage between Africa and the Spanish West Indies in 1566. English explorer and privateer Sir Francis Drake, who was Hawkins' second cousin, was part of the crew and also likely a relative of Lovell's.

Hawkins had made two slave voyages previously, which had angered the Spanish authorities. Under pressure from Spain, Hawkins had been prohibited by Queen Elizabeth I from undertaking slave voyages or going overseas, so instead he set up a new slave voyage with John Lovell as overall commander.

Lovell left Plymouth on 9 November, 1566, with four ships under his command; Paul, under Master James Hampton; Salomon, under Master James Raunse; Swallow; and Pascoe, under Master Robert Bolton.

He sailed to Guinea off the African coast and through piracy captured a Portuguese ship laden with enslaved people and other items. In the Cape Verde Islands, he captured two more Portuguese ships, one carrying enslaved people and sugar. He then sailed to the Isle of Maio and captured another two ships. He then set sail for the Spanish West Indies to sell the enslaved people and other cargo.

Lovell tried first to sell in Borburata the enslaved people and then at Rio de la Hacha (now known as Riohacha); however, the local governor, Castellanos, refused to allow the trade. Lovell was unable to sell the enslaved people so instead he picked ninety-two of most sickly or old and dropped them off to be taken by the Spanish. Two years later Hawkins returned to Rio de la Hacha on his next slave voyage and asked the same governor for compensation.

The Spanish later embellished the Lovell story writing to the mainland;

"A few days later another large fleet of English galleons and ships appeared, in command of John Lovell, and he made extensive preparations to trade in this town. Seeing that this was not permitted to him, they played many guns upon us, against which we defended ourselves so that we beat them into flight."

Lovell's voyage was viewed as a failure by both Hawkins and Drake. Hawkins remarked that the failure was due to the "simpleness" of his deputies.

Lovell was a Protestant, and, in 1574, a Welshman called Michael Morgan, who had been on the trip, confessed while being tortured on the rack that he had been converted to Protestantism by Drake. Morgan remarked "They recited psalms in every ship, along with the other things that are specified in ... the books the Protestants use in England."

Lovell was intolerant of other religious views and was recorded at Tenerife as saying "he had made a vow to God that he would come to these islands, burn the image of Our Lady in Candelaria, and roast a young goat in the coals."

== Sources ==
- Kelsey, Harry (2003). Sir John Hawkins: Queen Elizabeth's Slave Trader. Yale University Press. ISBN 9780300096637.
- Kelsey, Harry (2000). Sir Francis Drake: The Queen's Pirate. Yale University Press. ISBN 9780300084634.
- Sugden, John (2012). Sir Francis Drake. Random House. ISBN 9781448129508.
