= Francis Drake =

English sailor and privateer (c. 1540–1596)

Vice-Admiral Sir Francis Drake
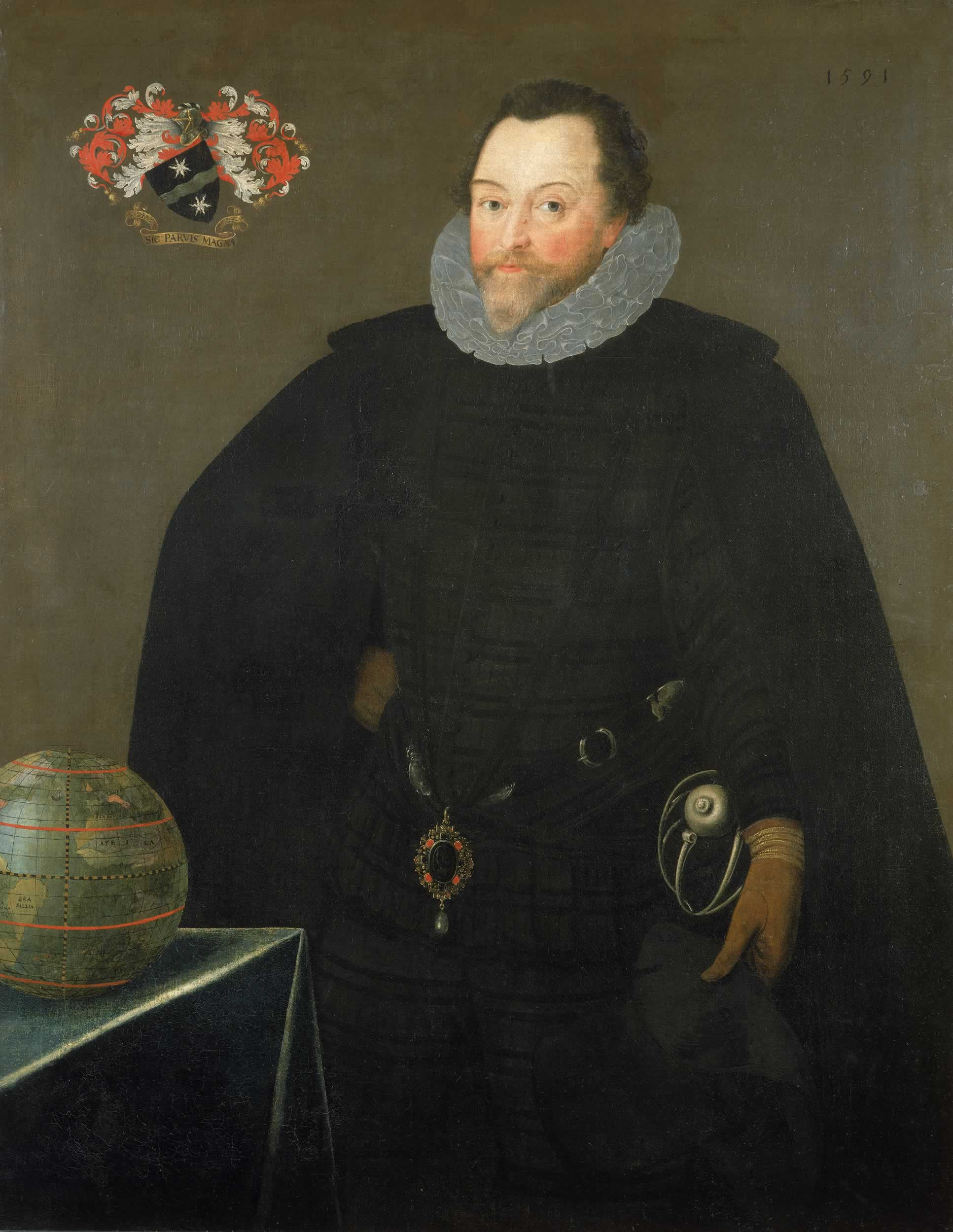
- Portrait by Marcus Gheeraerts, 1591
- Born: c. 1540; Tavistock, Devon, England
- Died: 28 January 1596 (aged 56) off the coast of Portobelo (today Panama)
- Spouses: Mary Newman (m. 1569; died 1581); Elizabeth Sydenham (m. 1585)
- Awards: Knight Bachelor (1581)
- Piratical career
- Nickname: El Draque (the Dragon)
- Type: Privateer
- Allegiance: Kingdom of England
- Years active: 1563–1596
- Rank: Vice admiral
- Base of operations: Caribbean Sea
- Commands: Golden Hind (previously known as Pelican); Bonaventure; Revenge
- Battles: See list: Tudor conquest of Ireland; Rathlin Island massacre; Anglo-Spanish trade war; Expedition of 1568; Expedition of 1572–1573; Expedition of 1577–1580; Anglo–Spanish War; Battle of Santiago; Battle of Santo Domingo; Battle of Cartagena de Indias; Raid on St. Augustine; Expedition of 1587; Spanish Armada; Battle of Gravelines; Drake-Norris Expedition; Siege of Coruña; Siege of Peniche; Siege of Lisbon; Raid on Vigo; Battle of Las Palmas; Battle of San Juan; Assault on Panama
- Wealth: Equiv. US$172 million in 2025; #2 Forbes top-earning pirates

Sir Francis Drake (c. 1540 – 28 January 1596) was an English explorer and privateer known for making the second circumnavigation of the world in a single expedition between 1577 and 1580 (being the first English expedition to accomplish this). He is also known for participating in the early English slaving voyages of his cousin, John Hawkins, and John Lovell. Having started as a simple seaman, in 1588 he was part of the fight against the Spanish Armada as a vice admiral.

At an early age, Drake was placed into the household of a relative, William Hawkins, a prominent sea captain in Plymouth. In 1572, he set sail on his first independent mission, privateering along the Spanish Main. Drake's circumnavigation began on 13 December 1577. He crossed the Pacific Ocean, until then an area of exclusive Spanish interest, and laid claim to New Albion, plundering coastal towns and ships for treasure and supplies as he went. He arrived back in England on 26 September 1580. Elizabeth I awarded Drake a knighthood in 1581 which he received aboard his galleon the Golden Hind.

Drake's circumnavigation of the Earth inaugurated an era of conflict with the Spanish and in 1585, the Anglo-Spanish War began. Drake was in command of an expedition to the Americas that attacked Spanish shipping and ports. When Philip II sent the Spanish Armada to England in 1588 as a precursor to its invasion, Drake was second-in-command of the English fleet that fought against and repulsed the Spanish fleet. A year later he led the English Armada in a failed attempt to destroy the remaining Spanish fleet.

Drake was a Member of Parliament (MP) for three constituencies: Camelford in 1581, Bossiney in 1584, and Plymouth in 1593. Drake's exploits made him a hero to the English, but his privateering led the Spanish to brand him a pirate, known to them as El Draque ("The Dragon" in old Spanish). He died of dysentery after his failed assault on Panama in January 1596.

== Birth and early years ==
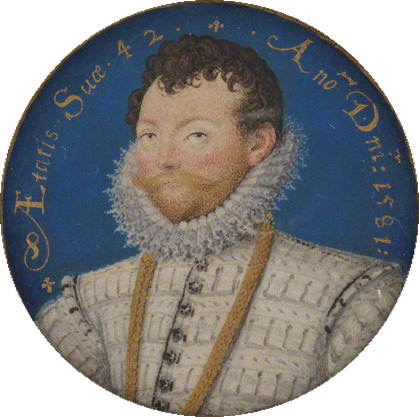
Portrait miniature by Nicholas Hilliard, 1581, inscribed Aetatis suae 42, An(n)o D(omi)ni 1581 ("42 years of his age, 1581 AD")

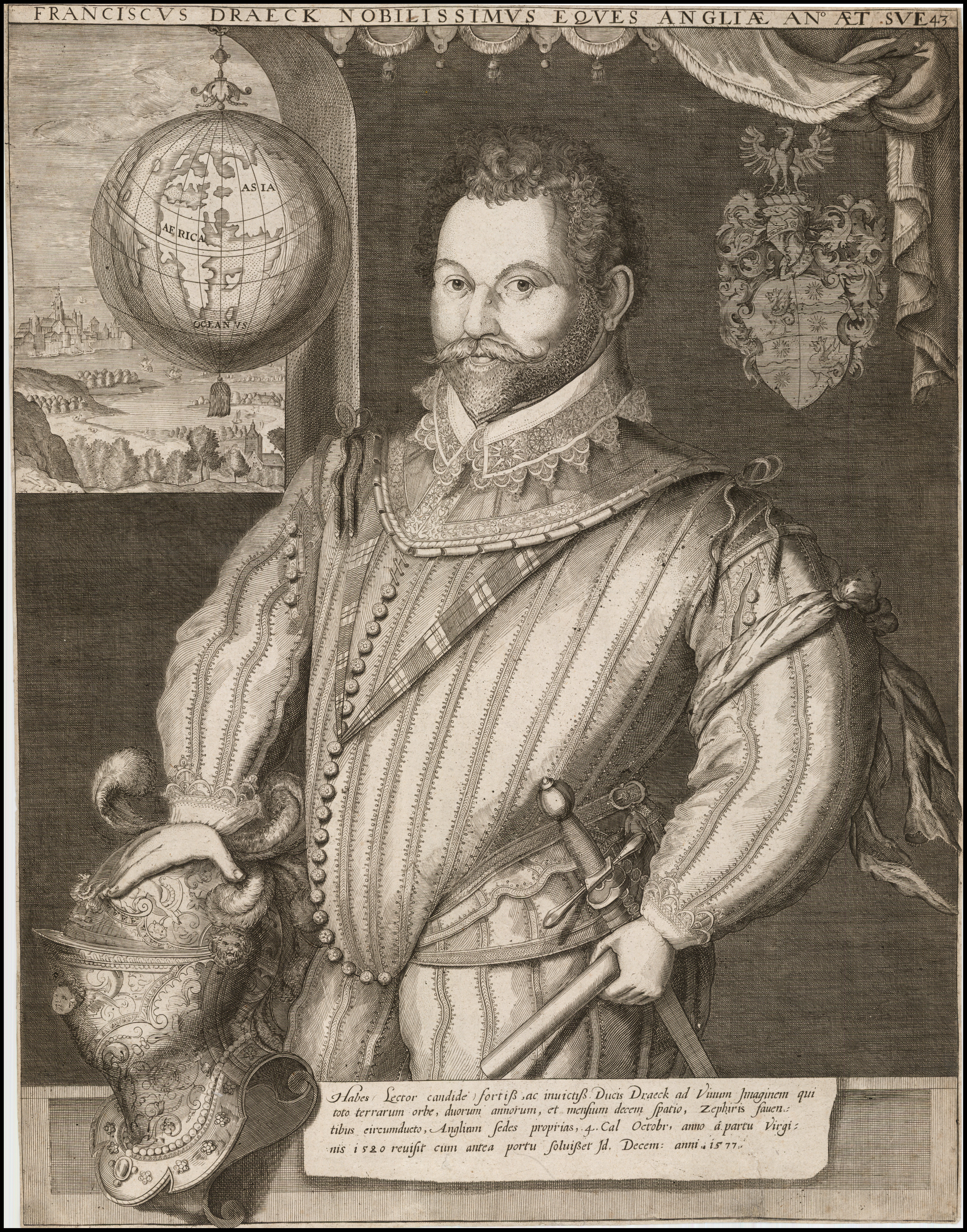
1583 portrait of Sir Francis Drake by Jodocus Hondius I

Francis Drake was born at Crowndale Farm in Tavistock, Devon, England. His birth date is not formally recorded – such writers as E. F. Benson have claimed that he was born while the Six Articles of 1539 were in force, but British naval historian Julian Corbett, writing of William Camden's account, on which this information is based, writes that "As a slip of memory, too, we must put down his difficult assertion that Edmund Drake was driven from Devonshire during a persecution under the Six Articles Act of 1539." His birth date is estimated from the wording of texts in contemporary sources such as: "Drake was two and twenty when he obtained the command of the Judith" (1566). This would date his birth to 1544. A date of c. 1540 is suggested from two portraits: one a miniature, painted by Nicholas Hilliard in 1581, when he was allegedly 42, which would place his birth c. 1539, while the other, painted in 1594 when he was said to be 52, would give a birth year of c. 1541.

He was the eldest of the twelve sons of Edmund Drake (1518–1585), a Protestant farmer, and his wife, Mary Mylwaye. The first son was said to have been named after his godfather, Francis Russell, 2nd Earl of Bedford.

Due to religious persecution during the Prayer Book Rebellion in 1549, the Drake family fled from Devon to Kent. There Drake's father obtained an appointment to minister to the men in the King's Navy. He was ordained deacon and was made vicar of Upchurch Church on the Medway.

== Early career at sea ==
At an early age, Drake was placed into the household of a relative, sea-captain William Hawkins of Plymouth, and began his seagoing training as an apprentice on Hawkins' boats. By 18, he was a purser, according to the English chronicler Edmund Howes, and in the 1550s, Drake's father found the young man a position with the owner and master of a small barque, one of the small traders plying between the Medway River and the Dutch coast. Drake likely engaged in commerce along the coast of England, the Low Countries and France. The ship's master was so satisfied with the young Drake's conduct that, being unmarried and childless at his death, he bequeathed the barque to Drake.

=== Slave trade ===
Sir John Hawkins (left) with Sir Francis Drake (centre), and Sir Thomas Cavendish

In 1562, the West African slave trade was a duopoly dominated by the Portuguese and the Spanish. Sir John Hawkins devised a plan to break into that trade, and enlisted the aid of colleagues and family to finance his first slave voyage. Drake was not part of that group of financiers, though his presence as one of hundreds of seamen on Hawkins's first two slaving voyages has been assumed. There is some anecdotal evidence to support Drake serving as a common seaman on the first two voyages, and good evidence of his presence for the last two of four slaving voyages made by Hawkins' ships between 1562 and 1569.

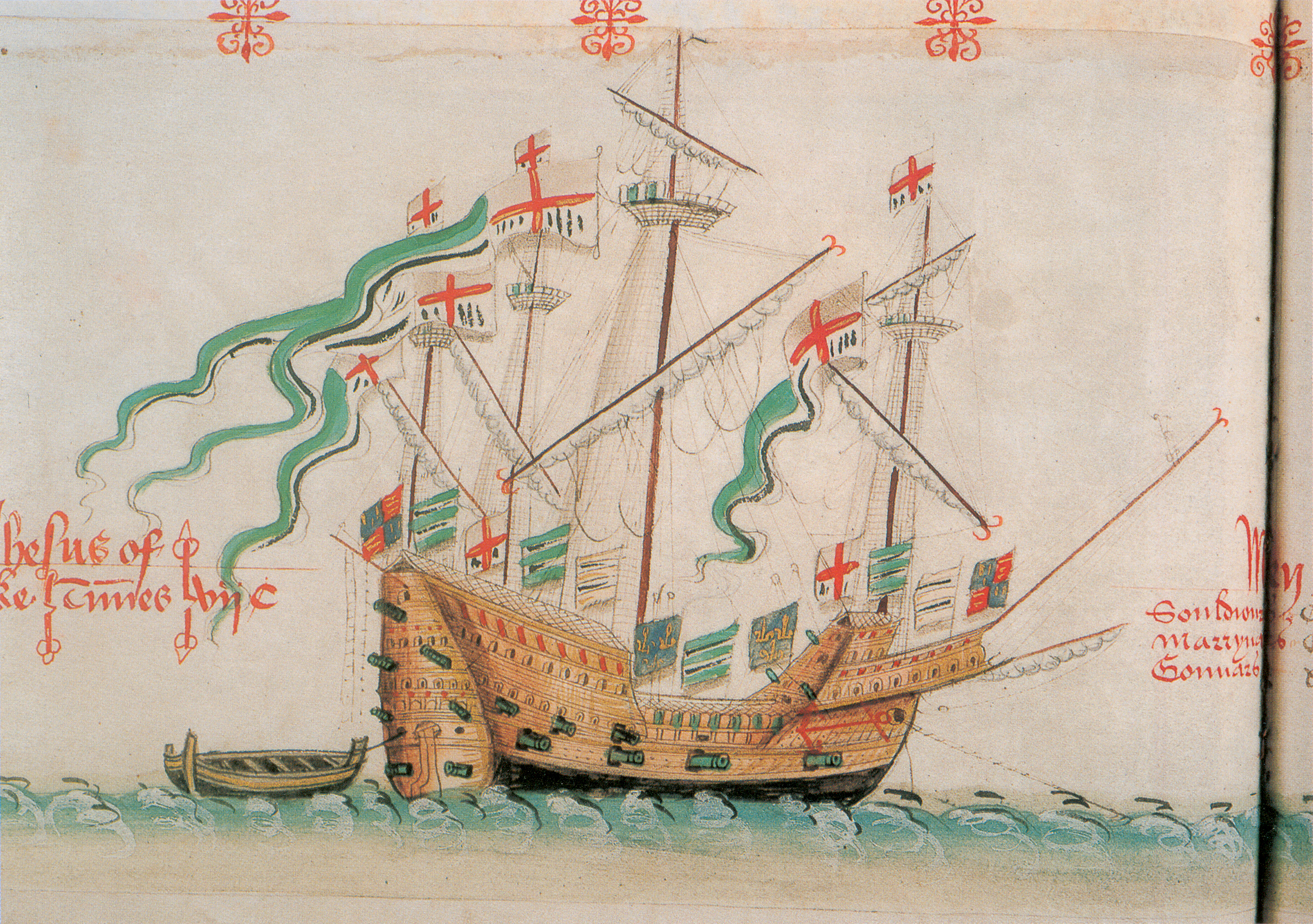
Jesus of Lübeck, flagship of Sir John Hawkins

In 1562, Hawkins sailed to the coast of the Sierra Leone, seized Portuguese slave ships, and sold the Africans in the Spanish Indies. It was highly profitable, so for his second slave voyage in 1564, Hawkins gained Queen Elizabeth I's support. She lent him one of her ships, Jesus of Lübeck, which served as his flagship. Hawkins attacked an African native town and sold many of its inhabitants in Spanish ports on the Caribbean mainland, making another large profit for himself, the Queen and the consortium of investors from her court. Sources vary on the dates and the age of Drake at the time; Harry Kelsey says he was twenty years old, "[a]ccording to Howes" (in reference to the English chronicler Edmund Howes writing in 1615). Drake was not a member of that consortium, but the crew would have received a small share of the profits. Based on this association, scholar Kris Lane lists Drake as one of the first English slave traders.

The Spanish and Portuguese were aggrieved that the English had entered into the slave trade and were selling slaves to their colonies despite being forbidden from doing so. Queen Elizabeth I, under pressure to avoid an armed conflict, forbade Hawkins from going to sea for a third slave voyage. In response, he set up a slave voyage with a relative, John Lovell, in command in 1566. Drake accompanied Lovell on this voyage. The voyage was unsuccessful, as more than 90 enslaved Africans were released without payment.

In 1567, Drake accompanied Hawkins on their next and last joint voyage. The crew attempted to capture slaves around Cape Verde, but failed. Hawkins allied himself with two local kings in Sierra Leone who asked for help against their enemies in exchange for half of any captives they took. Attacking from both sides, they took several hundred prisoners, though Kelsey says the kings kept "the larger share of slaves and dared Hawkins to do anything about it".

Events worsened for the fleet as it faced storms, Spanish hostility, armed conflict, and finally a hurricane that separated one ship from the rest, and it had to find its own way home. The remaining ships were forced into the port of San Juan de Ulúa near Vera Cruz so they could make repairs. Soon afterward the newly appointed viceroy of New Spain, Martín Enríquez de Almanza, arrived with a fleet of ships. While still negotiating to resupply and repair, Hawkins' ships were attacked by the Spanish ships in what became known as the Battle of San Juan de Ulúa. The battle ended in an English defeat with all but two of the English ships lost. The Spanish launched a fireship against Hawkins' flagship Jesus of Lübeck, and the crew of Minion in panic and fear cut the lines securing them to Jesus. Hawkins was among those who jumped from the flagship's bulwarks to Minion's decks. Drake, by this time the captain of Judith, fled leaving Hawkins behind. Hawkins escaped on Minion and limped back to England with dozens of his men dying along the way, and arriving with a crew of just 15. Hundreds of English seamen were abandoned.

After arriving back in England, Hawkins accused Drake of desertion and of stealing the treasure they had accumulated. Drake denied both accusations, asserting he had distributed all profits among the crew and that he had believed Hawkins was lost when he left. The bitter end of the fourth voyage turned Drake's life in a different direction: thereafter he would not pursue trading and slaving but would, instead, dedicate himself to attacking Spanish possessions wherever he found them. Drake's hostility towards the Spanish is said to have started with the battle and its aftermath.

The voyage of 1567–1569 was Drake's last association with slaving. In total, approximately 1,200 Africans were enslaved on these four voyages, and an estimated three times as many Africans were killed (based on the contemporaneous accounts of slavers). On the issue of slaving, scholar John Sugden writes that "Drake was in his twenties and did not question what his elders accepted", but must share some culpability for his participation.

=== Expedition of 1572–1573 ===
In 1572, Drake embarked on his first major independent enterprise. He planned an attack on the Isthmus of Panama, known to the Spanish as part of Tierra Firme and to the English as part of the Spanish Main. This was the point at which the silver and gold treasure of Peru had to be brought ashore and transported overland to the Caribbean Sea, where galleons from Spain would take it aboard at the town of Nombre de Dios. Drake left Plymouth on 24 May 1572, with a crew of 73 men in two small vessels, Pascha (70 tons) and Swan (25 tons), to capture Nombre de Dios.

Drake's first raid was late in July 1572. Drake captured Nombre de Dios, but he was badly wounded when the Spanish arrived from Panama, and his forces had to retreat without the gold, silver, pearls and jewels stored in the royal treasury. Rather than sacking Nombre de Dios again, Drake raided Spanish galleons along the coast and with his Cimarrón (African slaves who had escaped from their Spanish owners) allies looted the mule trains that transported gold, silver and trade goods from Panama City. One of these men was Diego, who became Drake's servant for wages, spending four years in England as a free man.

Among Drake's adventures along the Spanish Main, his capture of the Spanish Silver Train at Nombre de Dios on 1 April 1573 made him rich and famous. Near Cabo de Cativas he encountered a French privateer, Guillaume Le Testu, who was in command of the 80-ton warship Havre, and joined forces with him in a combined fleet. Drake had determined to intercept the mule train at the Campos River, two leagues from Nombre de Dios, and instructed the captains of his pinnaces to meet them at the Francisca River on 3 April to carry them off after the raid. The combined English and French raiding parties marched through the forest towards the trail, to within a mile of the city while the Cimarróns performed reconnaissance. The next morning, 1 April, they surprised the mule convoy and seized more than 200,000 pesos' worth of treasure.

After their attack on the richly laden mule train, Drake and his party found that they had captured around 20 tons of silver and gold. They buried much of the treasure, as it was too much for their party to carry, and made off with a fortune in gold. (An account of this may have given rise to subsequent stories of pirates and buried treasure). Badly wounded, Le Testu was captured and beheaded. The small band of adventurers dragged as much gold and silver as they could carry back across some 18 miles (29 km) of jungle-covered mountains to where they had left the raiding boats. When they got to the coast, the boats were gone. Drake and his men, downhearted, exhausted and hungry, had nowhere to go and the Spanish were not far behind.

At this point, Drake rallied his men, buried the treasure on the beach, and built a raft to sail in a heavy swell with four men twelve miles along the coast to where they had left two pinnaces. When Drake finally reached them, his men were alarmed at his bedraggled appearance. Fearing the worst, they asked him how the raid had gone. Drake could not resist a joke and teased them by looking downhearted. Then he laughed, pulled a quoit of Spanish gold from his clothes and said, "Our voyage is made." By the second week of August 1573, he had returned to Plymouth.

It was during this expedition that on 11 February Drake and his lieutenant John Oxenham climbed a high tree in the central mountains of the Isthmus of Panama and thus became the first Englishmen to see the Pacific Ocean, mirroring the achievement of the Spaniard Vasco Núñez de Balboa in 1513. The Cimarróns had cut steps into its trunk, on which Drake and the Cimarrón leader Pedro ascended to a platform at the top of the giant tree, where they were joined by Oxenham. The Englishmen vowed when they saw the Pacific Ocean that one day they would sail its waters – which Drake would do years later as part of his circumnavigation of the world.

When Drake returned to Plymouth after the raids, the government signed a temporary truce with King Philip II of Spain and so was unable to acknowledge Drake's accomplishment officially. Drake was considered a hero in England and a pirate in Spain for his raids.

=== Rathlin Island massacre ===
Drake was present at the 1575 Rathlin Island massacre in Ireland. Sir John Norris (or Norreys) and Drake, acting on the instructions of Sir Henry Sidney and the Earl of Essex, Robert Devereux, laid siege to Rathlin Castle. Despite its surrender, Norris' troops killed all the 200 defenders and several hundred more men, women and children of Clan MacDonnell. The remaining leader of the Gaelic defence against English power, Sorley Boy MacDonnell, was forced to stay on the mainland. Essex wrote in his letter to Queen Elizabeth's secretary that following the attack, Sorley Boy "was likely to have run mad for sorrow, tearing and tormenting himself and saying that he there lost all that he ever had."

== Circumnavigation (1577–1580) ==
Following the success of the Panama isthmus raid, Drake's so-called "Famous Voyage" – an expedition against the Spanish along the Pacific coast of the Americas – was organized and financed by a private syndicate that included Francis Walsingham, Robert Dudley, 1st Earl of Leicester, John Hawkins, Christopher Hatton, and Drake himself. Drake acted on the plan authored by Sir Richard Grenville, who in 1574 had received a royal patent for that purpose; just a year later this patent had been rescinded after Elizabeth I learned of Grenville's intentions against the Spanish. Elizabeth likely invested in Drake's voyage to South America in 1577, but never issued him a formal commission. This would be the first circumnavigation in 58 years.

Diego was once again employed under Drake; his fluency in Spanish and English would make him a useful interpreter when Spaniards or Spanish-speaking Portuguese were captured. He was employed as Drake's servant and was paid wages like the rest of the crew. Drake and the fleet set out from Plymouth on 15 November 1577, but bad weather threatened him and his fleet. They were forced to take refuge in Falmouth, Cornwall, from where they returned to Plymouth for repair.

After this major setback, Drake set sail again on 13 December aboard Pelican with four other ships and 164 men. He soon added a sixth ship, Mary (formerly Santa María), a Portuguese merchant ship that had been captured off the coast of Africa near the Cape Verde Islands. He also kidnapped its captain, Nuno da Silva, a man with considerable experience navigating in South American waters.

Drake's fleet suffered great attrition; he scuttled both Christopher and the flyboat Swan due to loss of men on the Atlantic crossing. He made landfall at the gloomy bay of Puerto San Julián, in what is now Argentina. Ferdinand Magellan had called there half a century earlier, where he put to death some mutineers. Drake's men saw weathered and bleached skeletons on the Spanish gibbets. Following Magellan's example, Drake tried and executed his own "mutineer" Thomas Doughty. The crew discovered that Mary had rotting timbers, so they put the vessel ashore, stripped it, and abandoned it. Drake decided to remain the winter in San Julián before attempting the Strait of Magellan.

=== Execution of Thomas Doughty ===
On his voyage to interfere with Spanish treasure fleets, Drake had several quarrels with his co-commander Thomas Doughty and on 3 June 1578, accused him of witchcraft and charged him with mutiny and treason in a shipboard trial. Drake claimed to have a (never presented) commission from the Queen to carry out such acts and denied Doughty a trial in England. The main pieces of evidence against Doughty were the testimony of the ship's carpenter, Edward Bright, who after the trial was promoted to master of the ship Marigold, and Doughty's admission of telling Lord Burghley, a vocal opponent of agitating the Spanish, of the intent of the voyage. Drake consented to his request of Communion and dined with him, of which Francis Fletcher had this account:

And after this holy repast, they dined also at the same table together, as cheerfully, in sobriety, as ever in their lives they had done aforetime, each cheering up the other, and taking their leave, by drinking each to other, as if some journey only had been in hand.

Drake had Thomas Doughty beheaded on 2 July 1578. In January 1580, when Drake became stranded upon a reef off the Celebes Sea, the ship's chaplain, Francis Fletcher, suggested in a sermon that the woes of the voyage were connected to the unjust demise of Doughty. Drake chained the clergyman to a hatch cover and pronounced him excommunicated.

=== Entering the Pacific (1578) ===
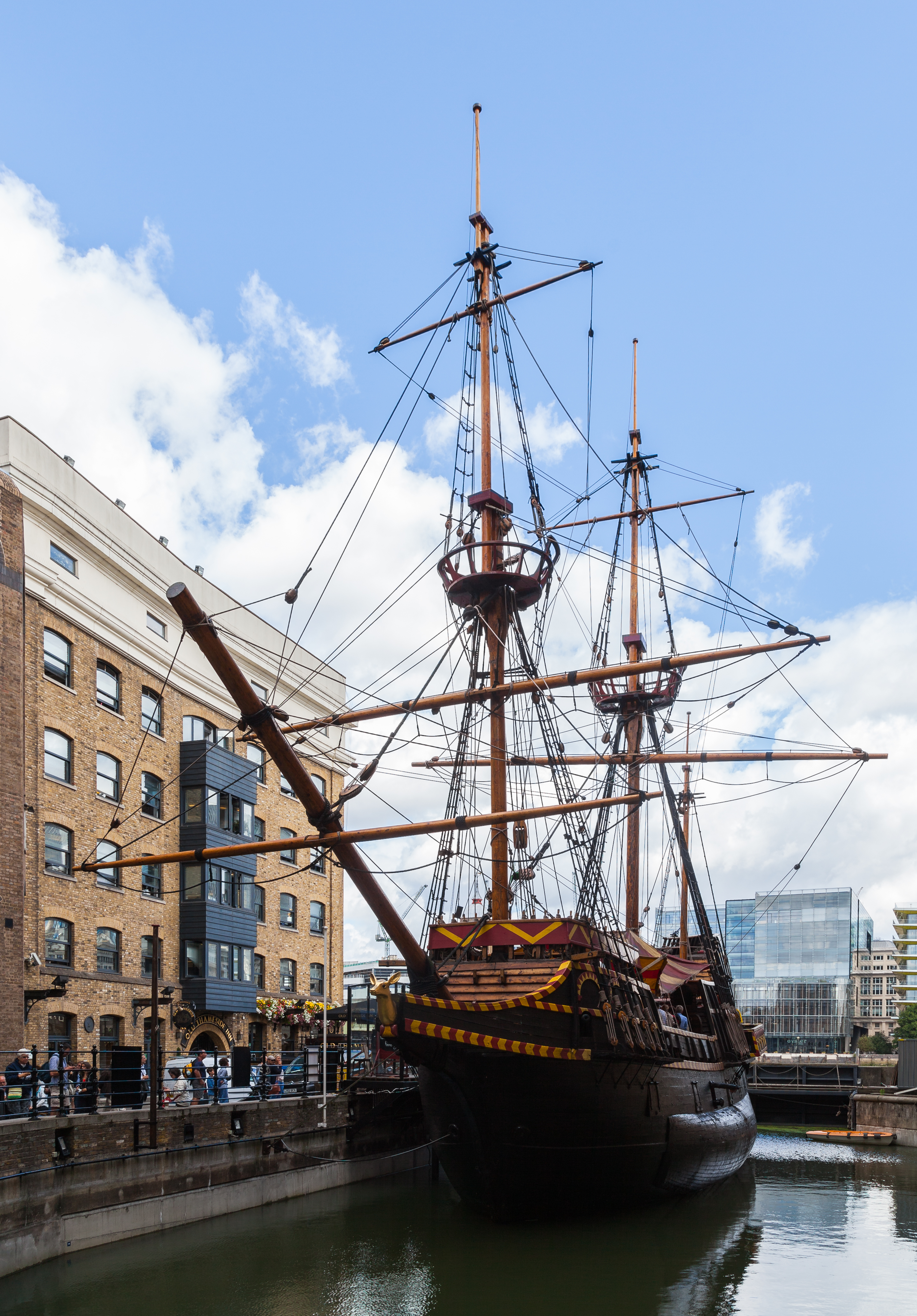
A replica of the Golden Hind at Bankside in London

The three remaining ships of his convoy departed for the Magellan Strait at the southern tip of South America. A few weeks later in September 1578 Drake made it to the Pacific, but violent storms destroyed one of the three ships, Marigold (captained by John Thomas) in the strait and caused another, Elizabeth, captained by John Wynter, to return to England, leaving only Pelican. After this passage, Pelican was pushed south and discovered an island that Drake called Elizabeth Island. Drake, like navigators before him, probably reached a latitude of 55°S (according to astronomical data quoted in Richard Hakluyt's The Principall Navigations, Voiages and Discoveries of the English Nation of 1589) along the Chilean coast.

In the Magellan Strait Drake and his men engaged in skirmishes with local indigenous people, becoming the first Europeans to kill indigenous peoples in southern Patagonia. During their stay in the strait, crew members discovered that an infusion made of the bark of Drimys winteri could be used as remedy against scurvy. Captain Wynter ordered the collection of great amounts of bark – hence the scientific name.

Historian Mateo Martinic, who examined records of Drake's travels, credits him with the discovery of the "southern end of the Americas and the oceanic space south of it". The first report of his discovery of an open channel south of Tierra del Fuego was written after the 1618 publication of the voyage of Willem Schouten and Jacob le Maire around Cape Horn in 1616.

=== Raids on Spanish American west coast ===
Drake pushed onwards in his lone flagship, now renamed Golden Hind in honour of Sir Christopher Hatton (after his coat of arms). Golden Hind sailed north along the Pacific coast of South America, attacking Spanish ports and pillaging towns. Some Spanish ships were captured, and Drake used their more accurate charts to inform his navigation. Before reaching the coast of Peru, Drake visited Mocha Island off the coast of what is now Chile, where he and his manservant Diego were seriously injured by hostile Mapuche who shot them with arrows. Later he sacked the port of Valparaíso further north in Chile, where he also captured a ship full of Chilean wine.

Near Lima, Drake captured a Spanish ship with 25,000 pesos of Peruvian gold, amounting in value to 37,000 ducats of Spanish money (about £7m by modern standards). Drake also discovered news of another ship, Nuestra Señora de la Concepción, which was sailing west towards Manila. It would come to be called Cacafuego. Drake gave chase and eventually captured the treasure ship, which proved his most profitable capture.

Aboard Nuestra Señora de la Concepción, Drake found 36 kg (80 lb) of gold, a golden crucifix, jewels, 13 chests of silver reals and 26,000 kilograms (26 long tons) of silver. Drake was naturally pleased at his good luck in capturing the galleon, and he showed it by dining with the captured ship's officers and gentleman passengers. He offloaded his captives a short time later, and gave each one gifts appropriate to their rank, as well as a letter of safe conduct.

Drake continued north, raiding more Spanish settlements and ships as he went. His last stop in this phase of the voyage was in the town of Guatulco, where he and his crew stayed from 13 to 16 April, looting provisions and other materials. From here, Drake began to consider how best to return to England. One possibility was to sail back south, along the Spanish coast, and return to the Atlantic Ocean via the Strait of Magellan (or possibly Cape Horn); this route was ruled out, however, to avoid the dangerous weather near the strait and presumed Spanish resistance all along the coast. This left two possible routes – continue north up the American coast, and return to the Atlantic by the rumoured Strait of Anián; or, sail across the Pacific, making for the East Indies, and from there return to England by completing a circumnavigation of the world.

=== Coast of California: Nova Albion (1579) ===
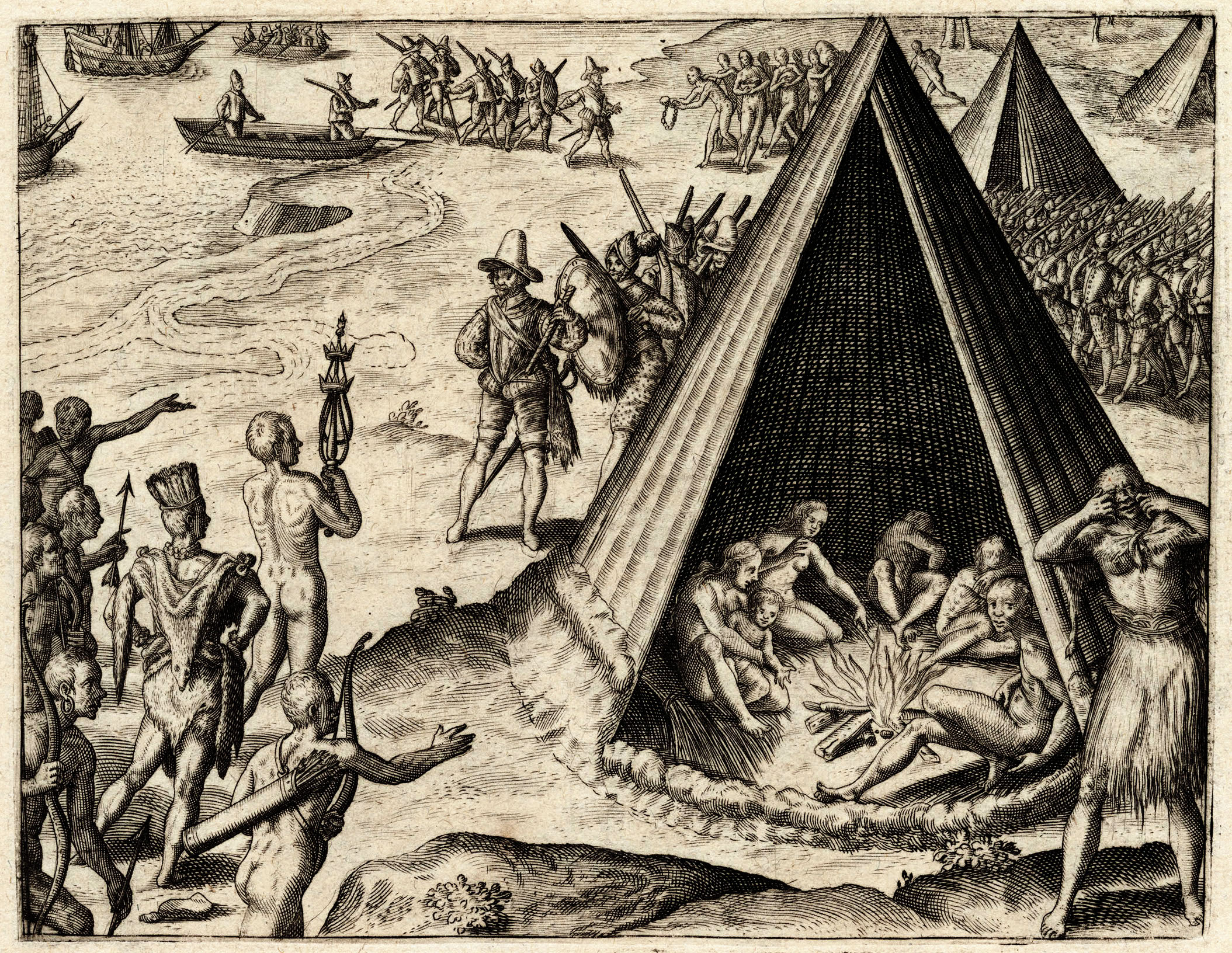
Drake's landing in California, engraving published 1590 by Theodor de Bry

In May, Drake's two ships passed the Baja California peninsula and continued north. Prior to Drake's voyage, the western coast of North America had only been partially explored in 1542 by Juan Rodríguez Cabrillo who sailed for Spain. So, intending to avoid further conflict with Spain, Drake navigated north-west of Spanish presence and sought a discreet site at which the crew could prepare for the journey back to England. The northernmost extent of this leg of the expedition has been the subject of much scholarly debate, but most sources agree that Drake reached a latitude of at least 48° north before turning back and heading south.

On 5 June 1579, the ship briefly made first landfall at what is now South Cove, Cape Arago, just south of Coos Bay, Oregon, and then sailed southward. On 17 June, Drake and his crew found a protected cove when they landed on the Pacific coast of what is now Northern California. While ashore, he claimed the area for Queen Elizabeth I as Nova Albion or New Albion. To document and assert his claim, Drake posted an engraved plate of brass to claim sovereignty for Elizabeth and every successive English monarch. After erecting a fort and tents ashore, the crew laboured for several weeks as they prepared for the circumnavigating voyage ahead by careening their ship, Golden Hind, to effectively clean and repair the hull. Drake had friendly interactions with the Coast Miwok and explored the surrounding land by foot. When his ship was ready for the return voyage, Drake and the crew left New Albion on 23 July and paused the journey the next day when anchoring the ship at the Farallon Islands where they hunted sea lions or seals.

=== Across the Pacific and around Africa ===
Drake left the Pacific coast, heading south-west to catch the winds that would carry his ship across the Pacific, and a few months later reached the Moluccas, a group of islands in the western Pacific, in eastern modern-day Indonesia. Harry Kelsey maintains, against scholarly consensus, that because of the contrary prevailing winds and currents, it is much more probable that Drake careened his ship on the shore of Magdalena Bay in Lower California, and sailed to the Moluccas and Spice Islands from there. At this time Diego died from wounds he had sustained earlier in the voyage; Golden Hind later became caught on a reef and was almost lost. Afterwards, the sailors waited three days for convenient tides and had dumped cargo. Befriending Sultan Babullah of Ternate in the Moluccas, Drake and his men became involved in some intrigues with the Portuguese there. He made multiple stops on his way toward the tip of Africa, eventually rounded the Cape of Good Hope, and reached Sierra Leone by 22 July 1580.

=== Return to Plymouth (1580) ===
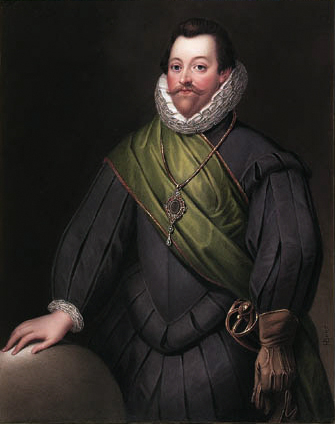
1829 portrait of Drake wearing the Drake Jewel

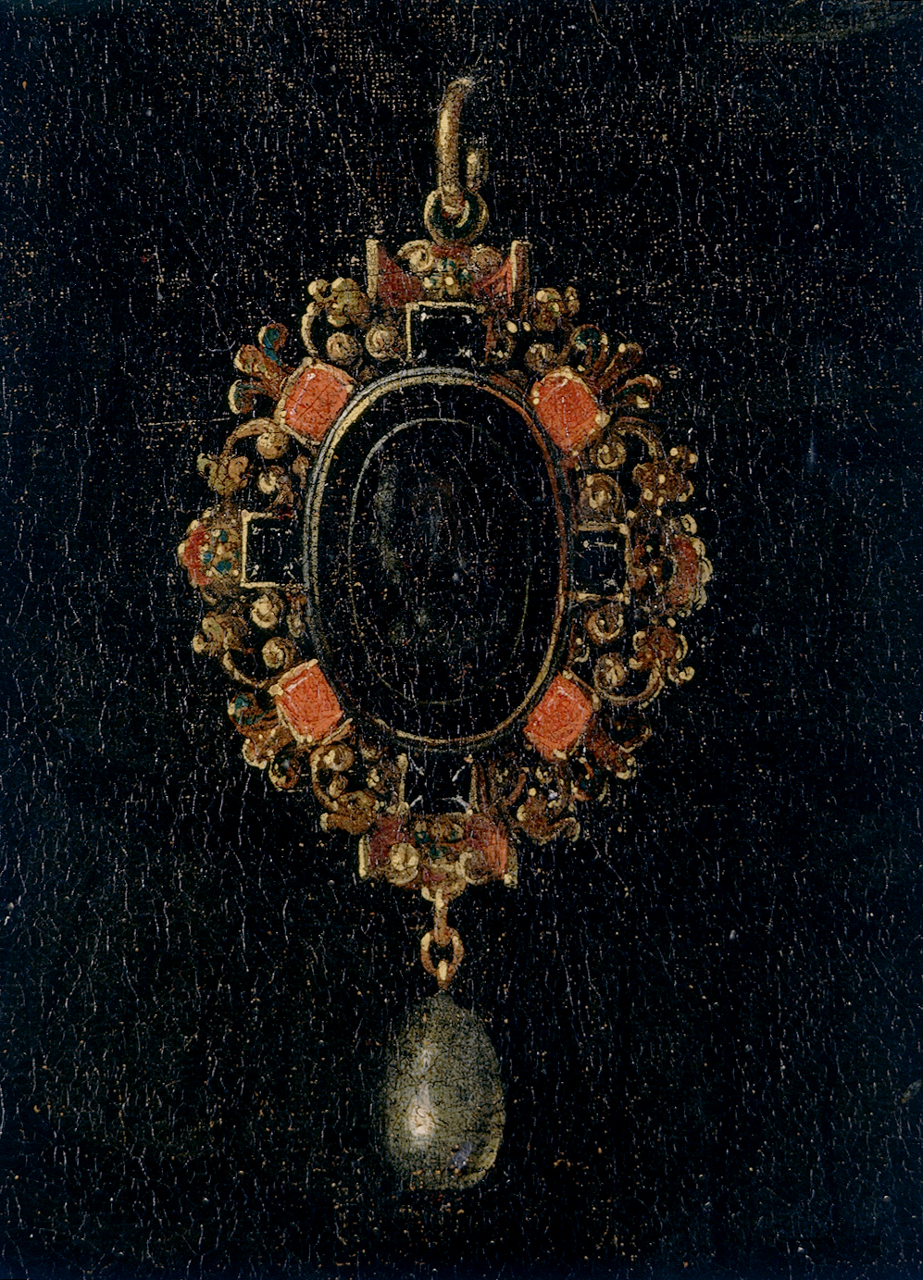
The Drake Jewel as painted by Marcus Gheeraerts the Younger in a 1591 portrait of Drake

On 26 September 1580, Golden Hind sailed into Plymouth with Drake and 59 remaining crew aboard, along with a rich cargo of spices and captured Spanish treasures. The queen's half-share of the cargo surpassed the rest of the crown's income for that entire year. Drake was hailed as the first Englishman to circumnavigate the Earth, and his was the second such voyage arriving with at least one ship intact, after Elcano's in 1520.

Queen Elizabeth declared that all written accounts of Drake's voyages were to become the queen's secrets of the Realm, and Drake and the other participants of his voyages on the pain of death sworn to their secrecy; she intended to keep Drake's activities hidden from the eyes of rival Spain.

Drake presented the queen with a jewel token commemorating the circumnavigation. Taken as a prize off the Pacific coast of Mexico, it was made of enamelled gold and bore an African diamond and a ship with an ebony hull.

To show her gratitude, the queen gave him the Drake Jewel, a valuable pendant surrounded by diamonds, rubies and pearls. It was an unusual gift to bestow upon a commoner, and one that Drake wore in a 1591 portrait by Marcus Gheeraerts. On one side of the pendant is a state portrait of Elizabeth by the miniaturist Nicholas Hilliard, on the other a sardonyx cameo of double portrait busts of African and European figures standing side by side. The Drake Jewel is a rare documented survivor among sixteenth-century jewels; it is conserved at the Victoria and Albert Museum, London.

=== Knighthood and arms ===
Queen Elizabeth awarded Drake a knighthood aboard Golden Hind in Deptford on 4 April 1581; the dubbing being performed by a French diplomat, Monsieur de Marchaumont, who was negotiating for Elizabeth to marry the King of France's brother, Francis, Duke of Anjou. By getting the French diplomat involved in the knighting, Elizabeth was gaining the implicit political support of the French for Drake's actions. During the Victorian era, in a spirit of nationalism, the story was promoted that Elizabeth I had done the knighting.

Sir Francis Drake's new heraldic achievement, with motto: Sic Parvis Magna

After receiving his knighthood Drake unilaterally adopted the coat of arms of the ancient Devon family of Drake of Ash, to whom he claimed a distant but unspecified kinship. The right to use the arms was disputed in court so Queen Elizabeth awarded Drake his own coat of arms.

Drake's heraldic achievement and coat of arms contains the motto, Sic Parvis Magna, which means: "Great achievements from small beginnings". A hand coming out of the clouds is labelled Auxilio Divino, which means "By divine aid".

== Political career ==
Drake first became a member of parliament for the last session of the 4th Parliament of Elizabeth I, on 16 January 1581, for the constituency of Camelford. He did not actively participate at this point, and on 17 February 1581 he was granted leave of absence "for certain his necessary business in the service of Her Majesty".

Drake became the Mayor of Plymouth in September 1581. During his tenure, he installed a compass in the town's Hoe, and passed a law regulating the local pilchard trade. During his term as lord mayor, Drake contracted to construct a leat, or canal, to bring water from the River Meavy, and to build six new gristmills on it from which he derived a substantial profit.

Drake became a member of parliament again in 1584 for Bossiney, on the forming of the 5th Parliament of Elizabeth I. He served the duration of the parliament and was active in issues regarding the navy, fishing, early American colonisation, and issues related chiefly to Devon. He spent the time covered by the next two parliamentary terms engaged in other duties and an expedition to Portugal.

He became a member of parliament for Plymouth in 1593. He was active in issues of interest to Plymouth as a whole, but also to emphasise defence against the Spanish.

== Great Expedition to America ==
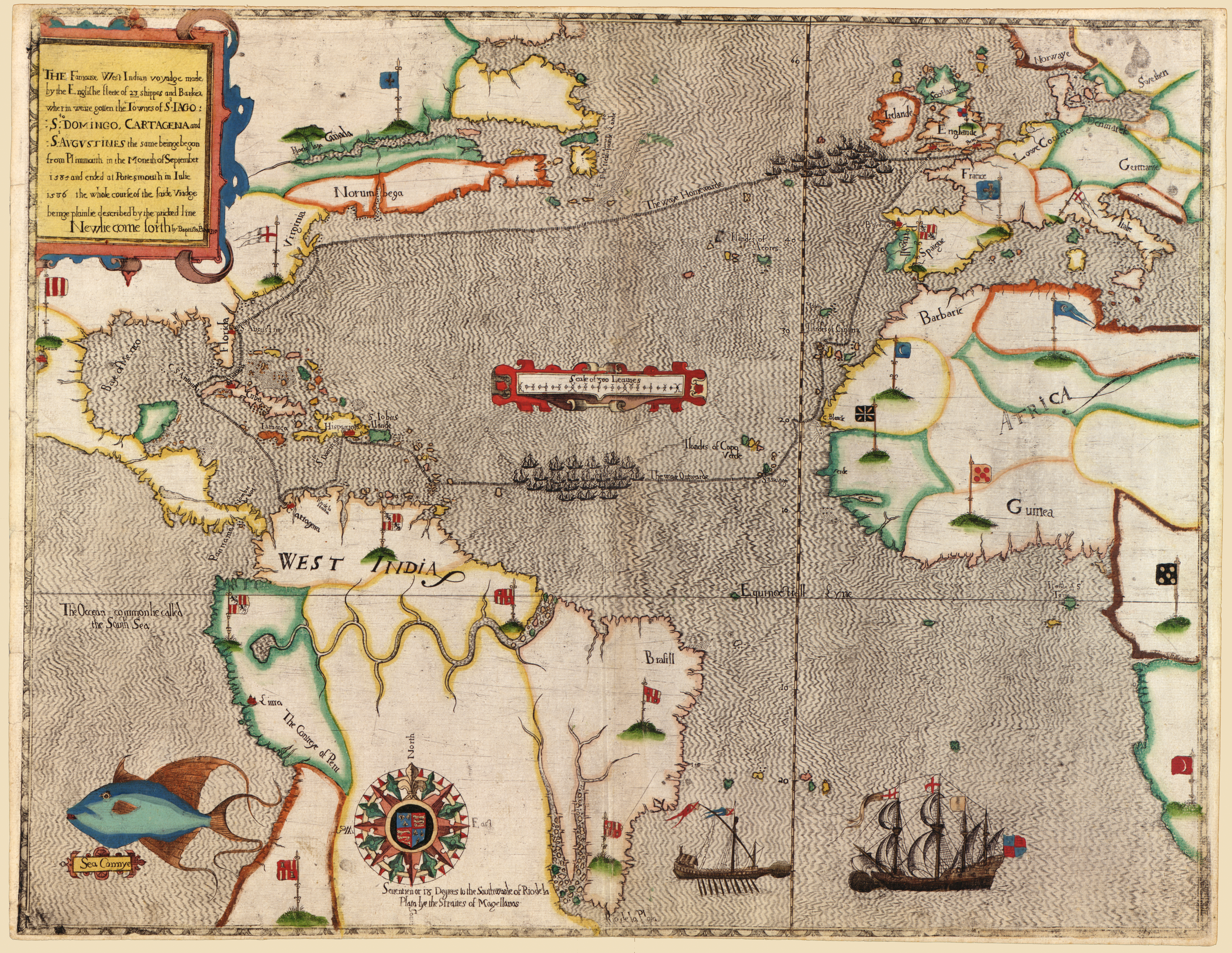
Map of Drake's Great Expedition in 1585 by Giovanni Battista Boazio

War broke out between England and Spain in 1585, after the signing of the Treaty of Nonsuch. Queen Elizabeth I, through her principal secretary Francis Walsingham, ordered Sir Francis Drake to lead an expedition to attack the Spanish colonies in a kind of pre-emptive strike. An expedition left Plymouth in September 1585 with Drake in command of twenty-one ships with 1,800 soldiers under Christopher Carleill. He first attacked Vigo in Spain and held the place for two weeks ransoming supplies. He then plundered Santiago in the Cape Verde islands after which the fleet then sailed across the Atlantic, sacked the port of Santo Domingo, and captured the city of Cartagena de Indias in present-day Colombia. At Cartagena, Drake released one hundred Turkish slaves. On 6 June 1586, during the return leg of the voyage, he attacked the wooden Spanish fort at San Agustín in Spanish Florida and burnt the town to the ground.

After the raids he then went on to find Sir Walter Raleigh's settlement much further north at Roanoke which he replenished and also took back with him all of the original colonists before Sir Richard Grenville arrived with supplies and more colonists. He finally reached England on 22 July, when he sailed into Portsmouth, England to a hero's welcome.

== Conflict with the Spanish Armada ==
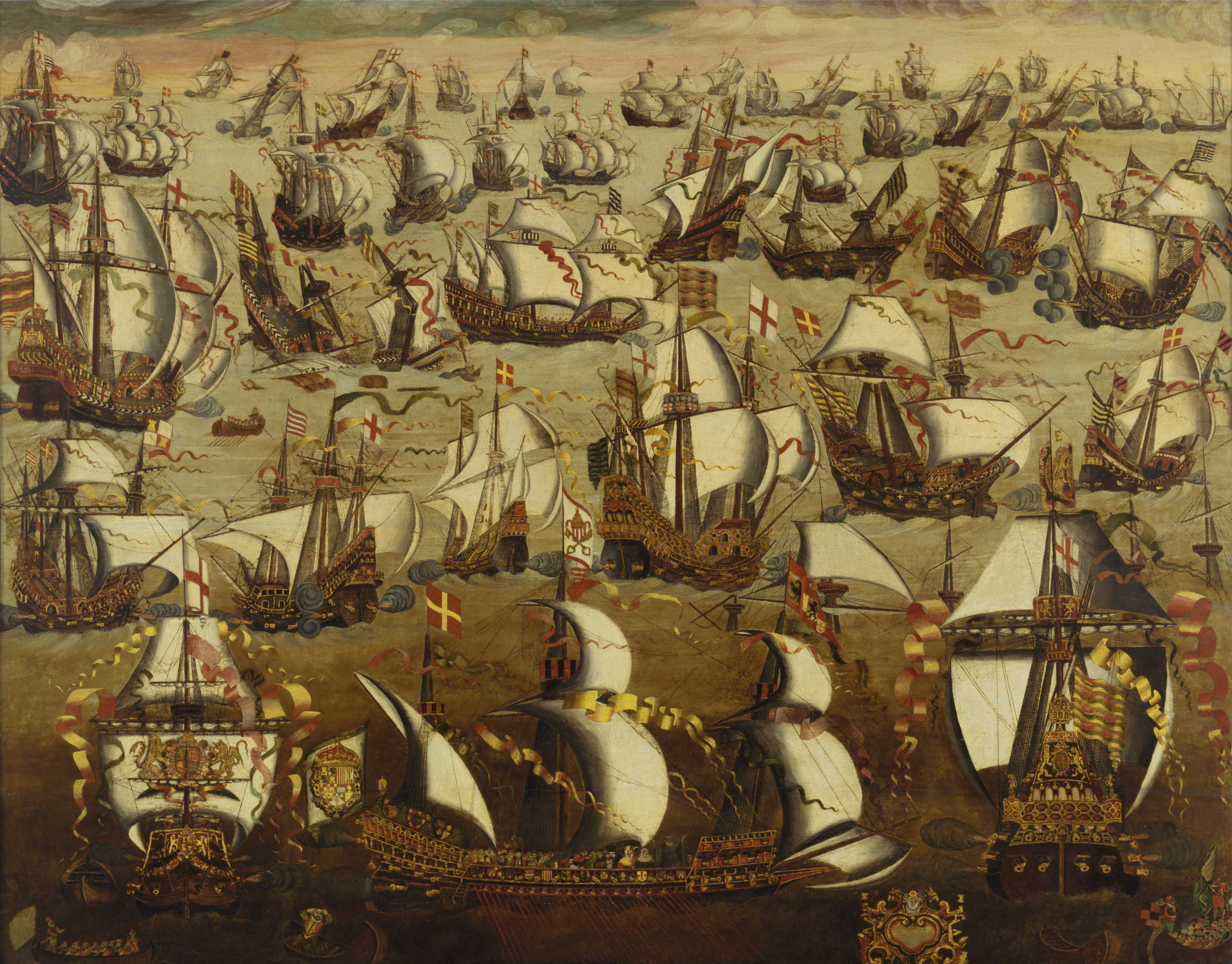
Painting depicting 'English Ships and the Spanish Armada'

In part to prevent future such attacks by English and Dutch privateers against Spanish interests in the Americas, Philip II ordered a planned invasion of England.

=== Cádiz raid ===
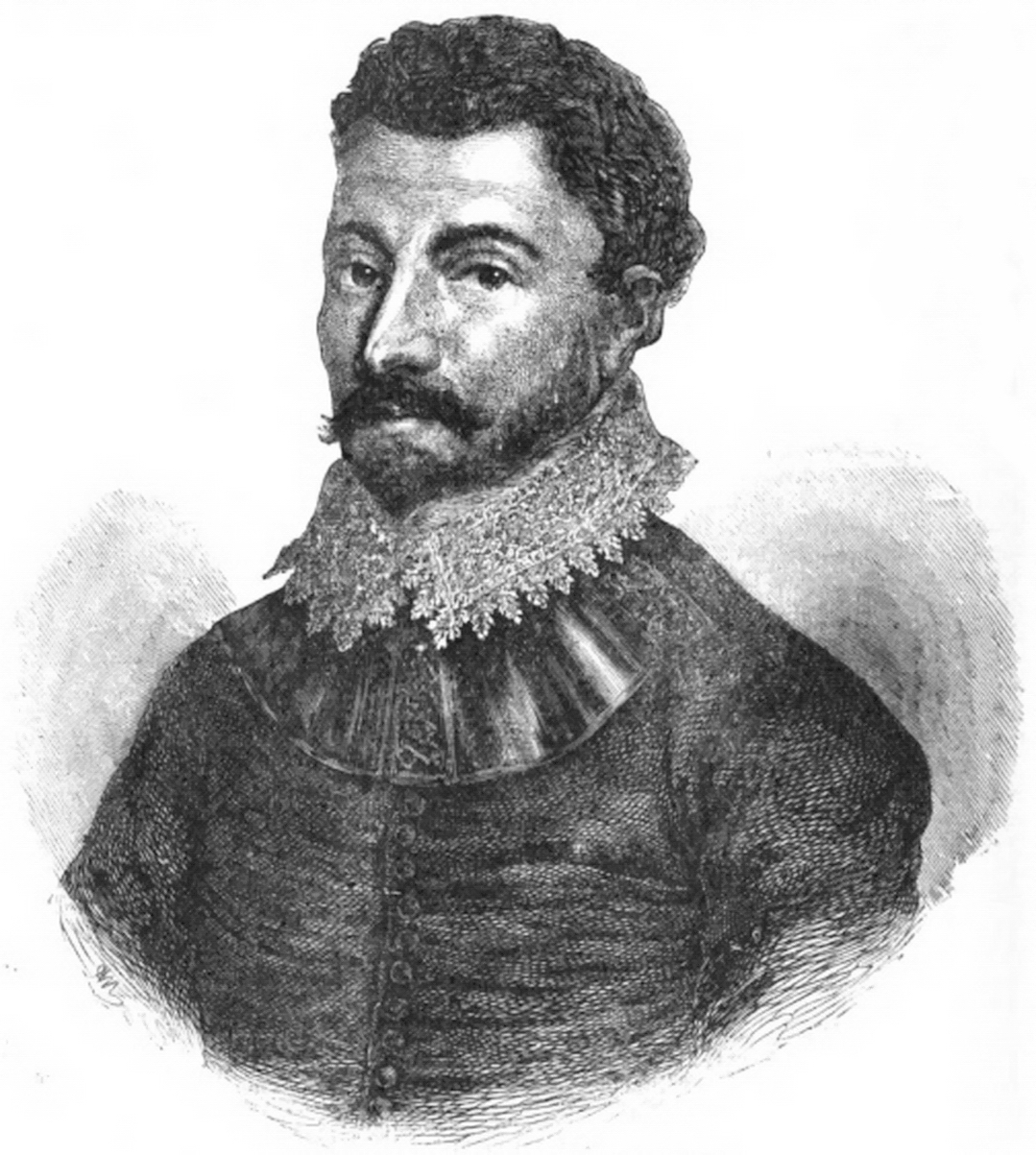
Portrait of Drake around 1587, in Cassell's illustrated history of England

On 15 March 1587, Drake accepted a new commission with several purposes: to disrupt the shipping routes in order to slow supplies from Italy and Andalucia to Lisbon, to trouble enemy fleets that were in their home ports, and to capture Spanish ships laden with treasure. Drake was also to confront and attack the Spanish Armada had it already sailed for England. When arriving at Cádiz on 19 April, Drake found the harbour packed with ships and supplies as the Armada was readying and waiting for a fair wind to launch the fleet to attack. In the early hours of the next day, Drake pressed his attack into the inner harbour and inflicted heavy damage. Claims of the exact Spanish ship losses vary: Drake claimed he had sunk 39 ships, while the Spanish admitted the loss of only 24. The attack became known as the "singeing of the King's beard" and delayed the Spanish invasion by a year.

Over the next month, Drake patrolled the Iberian coasts between Lisbon and Cape St. Vincent, intercepting and destroying ships on the Spanish supply lines. Drake estimated that he had captured around 1,600 to 1,700 tons of barrel staves, enough to make 25,000 to 30,000 barrels (4,000 to 4,800 m^{3}) for containing provisions. The expedition resulted in a total profit for England of around £140,000, £18,235 of which went to Drake.

=== Defeat of the Spanish Armada ===
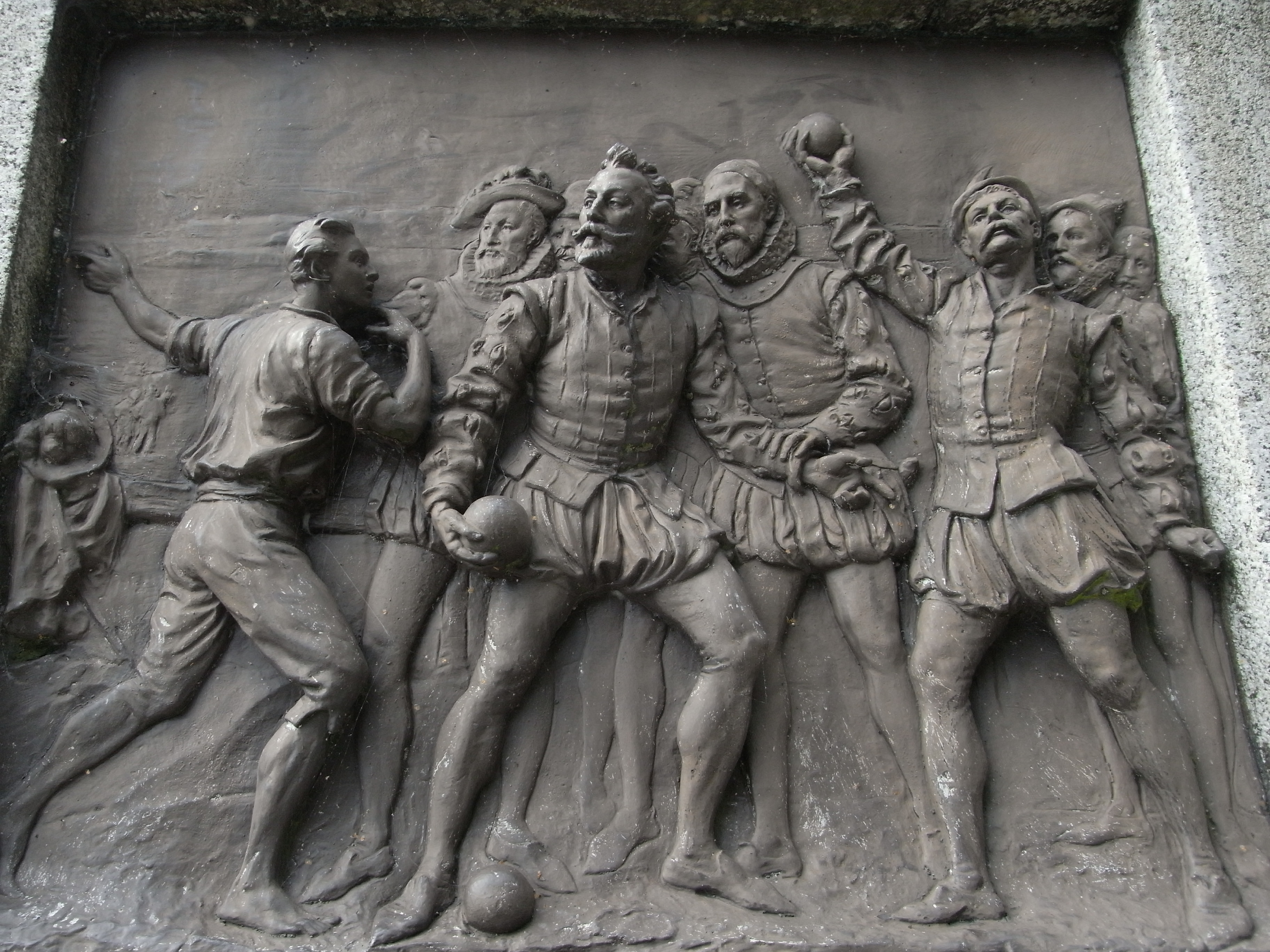
Drake was reportedly playing bowls when first informed about the approach of the Armada.

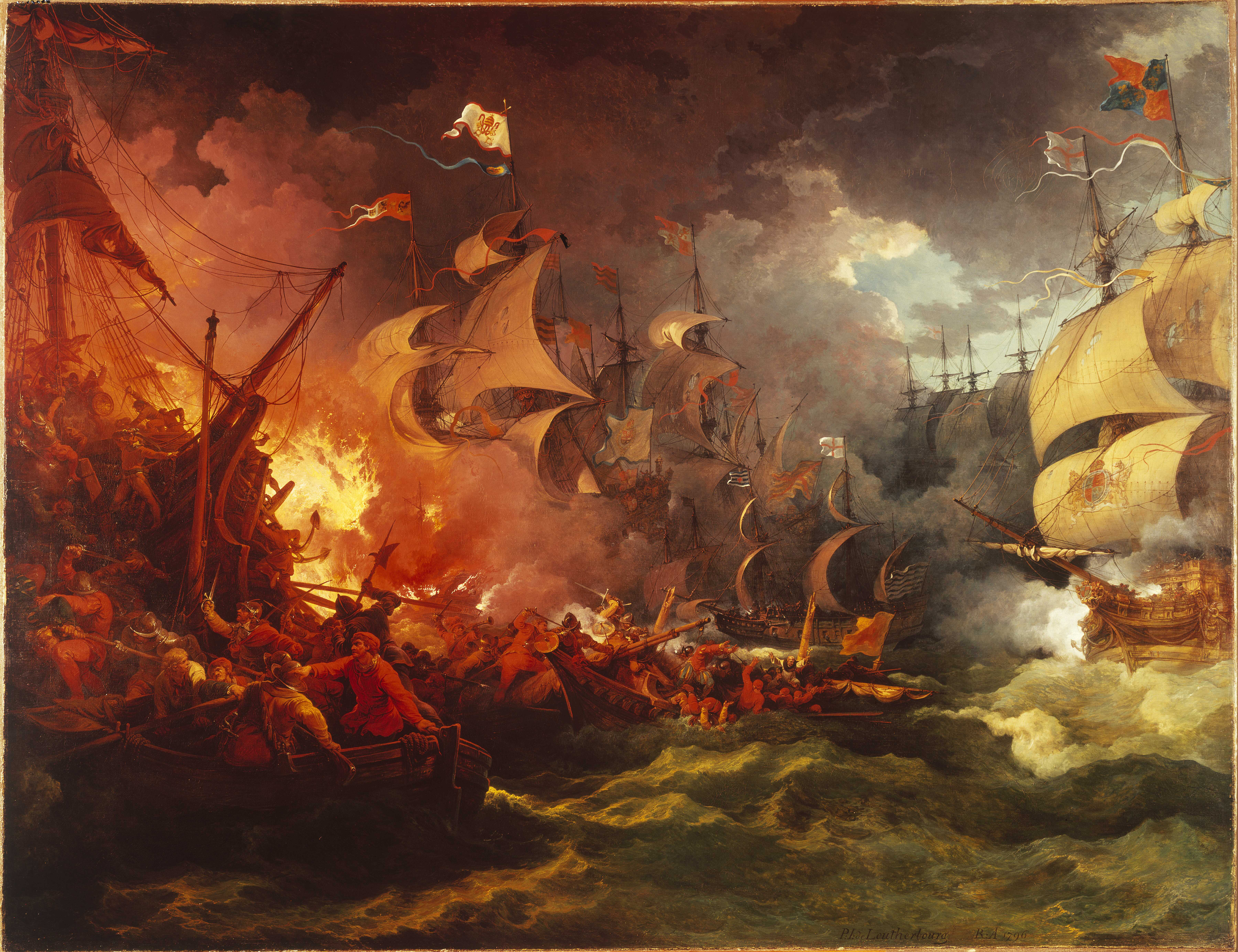
Defeat of the Spanish Armada by Philip James de Loutherbourg. A Depiction of the Battle of Gravelines showing fire ships

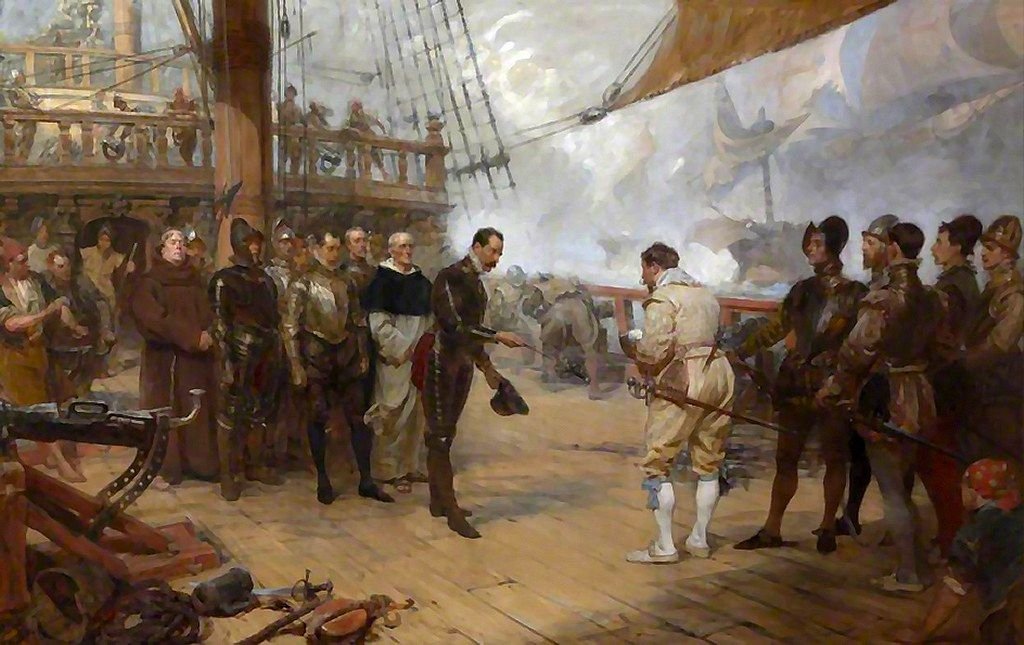
Admiral Pedro de Valdés surrendering his sword to Francis Drake aboard Revenge during the attack of the Spanish Armada, 1588. Oil on canvas by John Seymour Lucas (1889)

The Spanish Armada set sail for England in May 1588, and arrived on the English coast on 29 July, near Cornwall. An English fleet consisting of 55 ships set out from Plymouth to confront the Armada, under the command of Lord Howard of Effingham, with Sir Francis Drake serving as vice admiral, commanding from the galleon Revenge. As the English fleet pursued the Armada up the English Channel in closing darkness, Drake broke off and captured the disabled Spanish galleon Nuestra Señora del Rosario, along with Admiral Pedro de Valdés and most of his crew. The Spanish ship was known to be carrying substantial funds to pay the Spanish Armada. Drake's ship had been leading the English pursuit of the Armada by means of a lantern. By extinguishing this for the capture, Drake put the English fleet into disarray overnight.

The Duke of Medina Sidonia, whom Philip had appointed to command the Armada despite his complete lack of military experience on land or at sea, made his way up the Channel towards the French shore in his flagship San Martín with the English in pursuit, thinking that if he anchored in the roadstead of Calais they would not dare molest the Spanish ships in French waters.

A council of war was held aboard Howard's flagship Ark, where Howard, Drake, Henry Seymour, Hawkins, Martin Frobisher, and two or three others, decided to launch fire ships. That night the English launched eight fire ships into the midst of the Armada at its moorings, forcing its captains to cut their anchors and sail out of Calais into the open sea. The decisive action was fought the next day on the shoals off Gravelines, where Frobisher, Drake, and Hawkins pounded the Spanish ships with their guns. Drake's squadron gave Medina Sidonia's flagship San Martin a single broadside and moved on; Frobisher, directly behind him in the English line, stayed with the San Martin at close range and poured cannon shot into her oaken flanks, but failed to take her. Five Spanish ships were lost.

Drake wrote as follows to Admiral Henry Seymour after coming upon part of the Spanish Armada, whilst aboard Revenge on 31 July 1588 (21 July 1588 OS):

The 21st we had them in chase, and so coming up unto them, there hath passed some cannon shot between some of our fleet and some of them, and as far as we perceive they are determined to sell their lives with blows.

The Armada, having failed in their aim, were unable to sail back via the English channel. The English ships, including Revenge, pursued them to prevent any landing on English soil, although by this time most of Howard's ships were almost out of shot. Nevertheless, the battered Spanish fleet were forced to sail instead around the British isles and encountered heavy storms off the coast of Ireland. The fleet eventually limped back to Spanish ports having lost overall some 63 ships and vessels.

The most famous (but probably apocryphal) anecdote about Drake relates that, prior to the battle, he was playing a game of bowls on Plymouth Hoe. On being warned of the approach of the Spanish fleet, Drake is said to have remarked that there was plenty of time to finish the game and still beat the Spaniards, perhaps because he was waiting for high tide. There is no known eyewitness account of this incident and the earliest retelling of it was printed 37 years later. Adverse winds and currents caused some delay in the launching of the English fleet as the Spanish drew nearer, perhaps prompting a popular myth of Drake's cavalier attitude to the Spanish threat.

=== English Armada ===
The people of quality dislike him for having risen so high from such a lowly family; the rest say he is the main cause of wars.

— – Gonzalo González del Castillo, letter to King Philip II, 1592

In 1589, the year after the failure of the Spanish Armada, the English sent their own armada to attack Spain. Drake and Norris were given three tasks. First, to destroy the battered Spanish Atlantic fleet, which was being repaired in ports of northern Spain. Second, to make a landing at Lisbon, Portugal and raise a revolt there against King Philip II (Philip I of Portugal) installing the pretender Dom António, Prior of Crato to the Portuguese throne. And, third, to take the Azores if possible so as to establish a permanent base.

In the siege of Coruña, Drake and Norris destroyed a few ships in the harbour of A Coruña in Spain but were repelled. This defeat in all fronts delayed Drake for two weeks, and he was forced to forgo hunting the rest of the surviving ships and head on to Lisbon.

Norris led his army on a difficult march over the rocky coast to Lisbon, while Drake sailed around the peninsula to join Essex with his heavy artillery. Norris's troops were sick and exhausted by the time they reached the western limits of the city, consequently he demanded that Dom António raise provisions and men to fight for his cause from amongst the local populace, or the army would retreat. Drake, against their agreed plans, had anchored his fleet in the mouth of the Tagus estuary, rather than running the risk of sailing past the well-defended stretches of the Tagus to bring the desperately needed heavy cannon and ordnance. The anticipated rebellion never materialised and the ground campaign was a total failure, so Norris, with his army and António, re-embarked to make an attempt at capturing the treasure fleet. The weather was not in their favour so they eventually sailed for home.

However, Drake wanted to atone for such a bitter setback and, in order not to return empty-handed and with the morale of his troops sunk, he made a fleeting stop in the Galician rías, or coastal inlets, pillaging the defenceless town of Vigo for two days and razing it to the ground. This abusive demonstration did not leave the corsair unharmed, as he lost hundreds more men on land, in addition to as many as two hundred wounded. The growing defences of the inhabitants, and the arrivals of militias from Portugal, put the ships in retreat again. Two of the vessels sailing back to Plymouth were captured in the Bay of Biscay by a squadron of zabras led by Captain Diego de Aramburu.

The failure cost the lives of 11,000 English soldiers and sailors, according to Bucholz and Key; Robert Hutchinson says between 8,000 and 11,000 died; while Gorrochategui Santos calculates the number at over 20,000. Upon his return, Drake's behaviour in the expedition was increasingly called into question, culminating in his being charged by England's Privy Council of deliberate failings and a mishandling of his command. Despite never being publicly admonished on these charges, he nevertheless fell out of favour, and was not given command of another naval expedition until 1595.

== Defeats and death ==
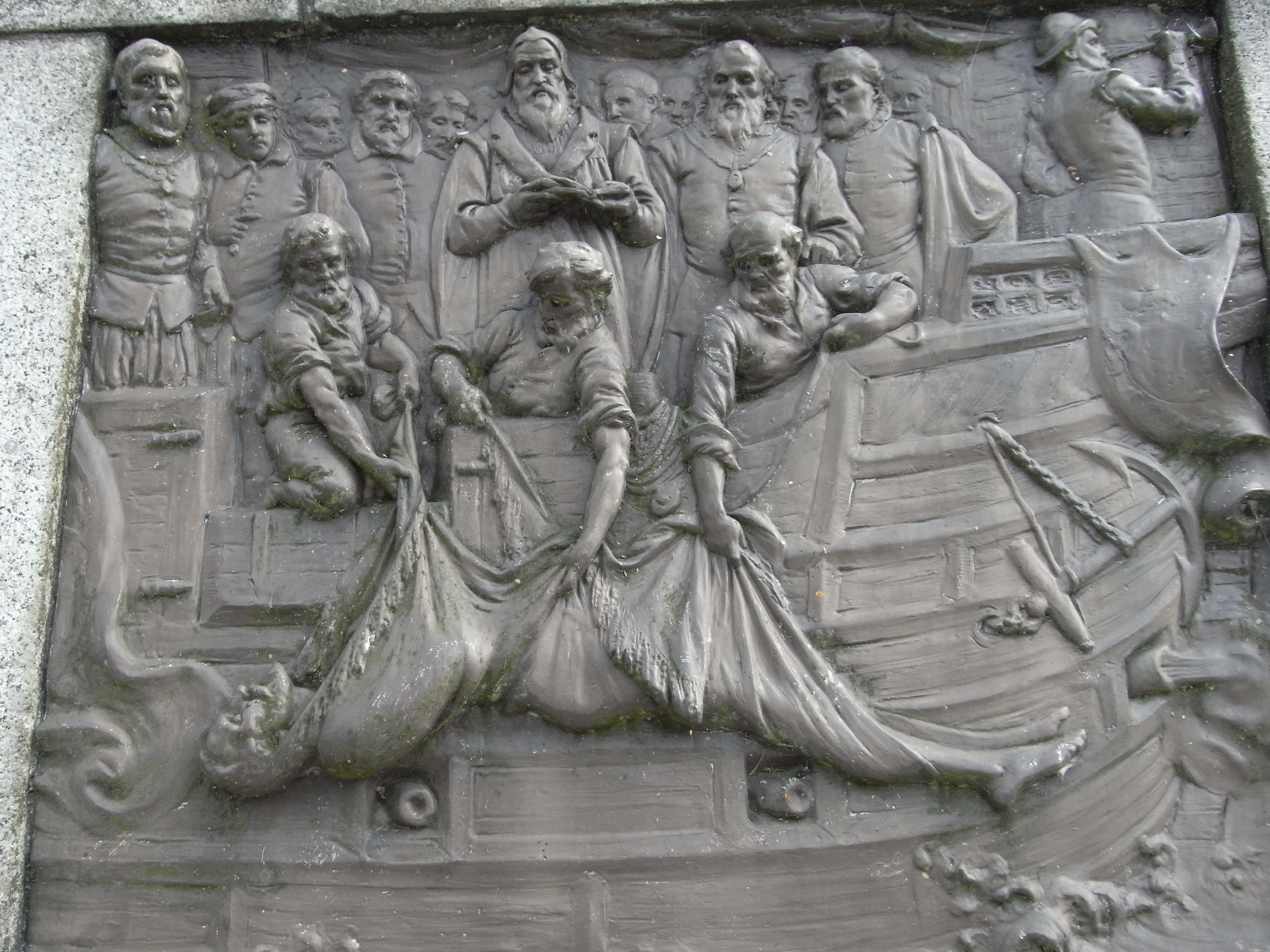
Drake's burial at sea off Portobello (artistic licence - he was in fact buried in a coffin). Bronze plaque by Joseph Boehm, 1883, base of Drake statue, Tavistock

Drake's seafaring career continued into his mid-fifties. In 1595, he failed to conquer the port of Las Palmas, and following a disastrous campaign against Spanish America, where he suffered a number of defeats, he unsuccessfully attacked San Juan de Puerto Rico, and lost the Battle of San Juan. The Spanish gunners from El Morro Castle shot a cannonball through his stateroom on the expedition's flagship, but he survived.

He and his second-in-command, Thomas Baskerville, captured and burned Nombre de Dios, and started an overland crossing of the isthmus to attack the city of Panama, but were repulsed by the well-entrenched Spaniards who had barricaded the road; suffering heavy casualties, they gave up the attempt. A few weeks later, on 28 January 1596, Drake died (aged about 56) of dysentery, a common disease at the time, while anchored off the coast of Portobelo where some Spanish treasure ships had sought shelter. Following his death, the English fleet withdrew defeated.

Before dying, he asked to be dressed in his full armour. He was buried at sea in a sealed lead-lined coffin, near Portobelo, a few miles off the coastline. It is supposed that his final resting place is near the wrecks of two British ships, Elizabeth and Delight, scuttled in Portobelo Bay. Efforts by researchers and treasure hunters to discover the location of his remains are ongoing, while divers continue to search the seabed for the coffin.

== Family and heritage ==
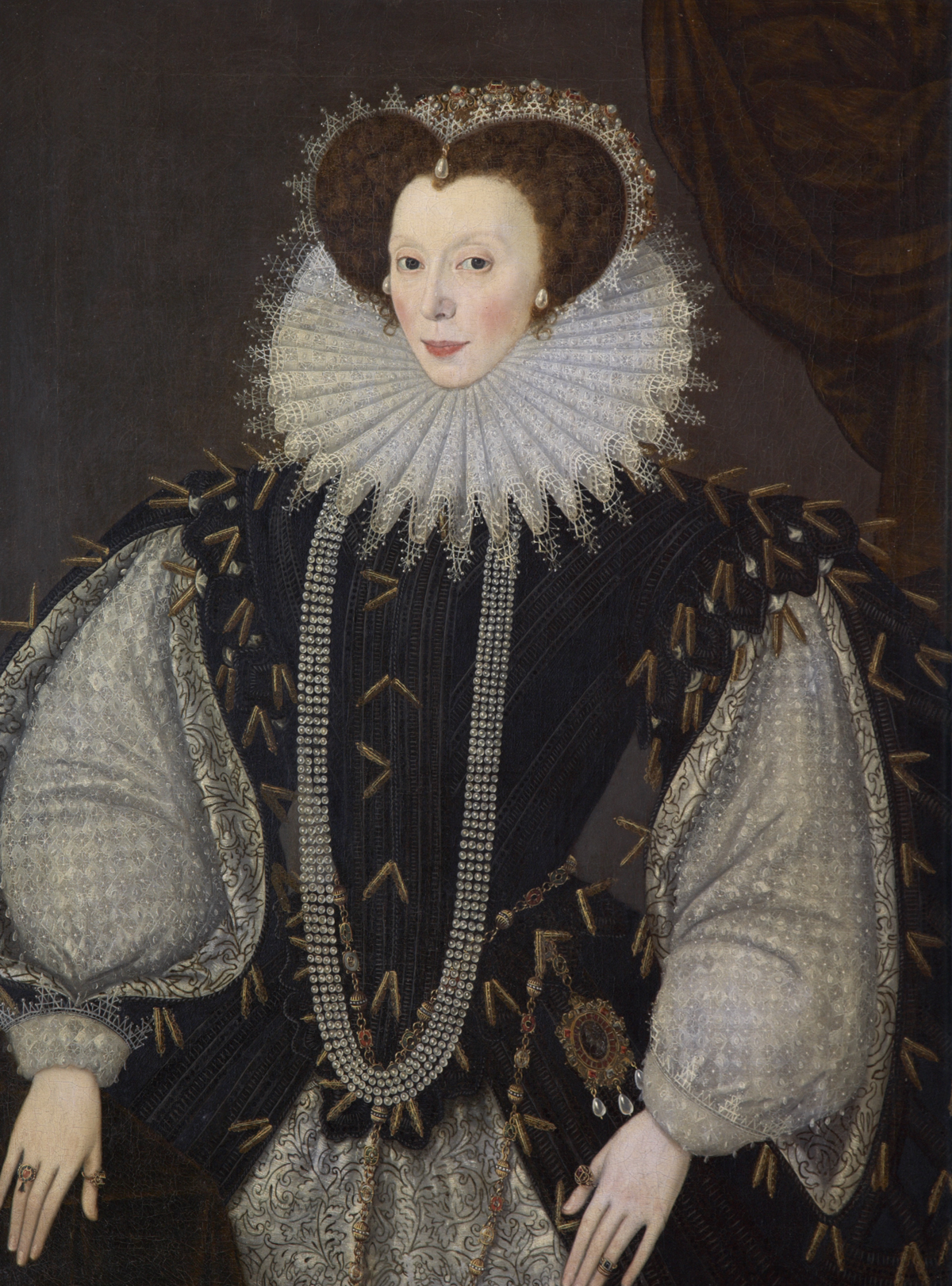
Elizabeth Sydenham Lady Drake

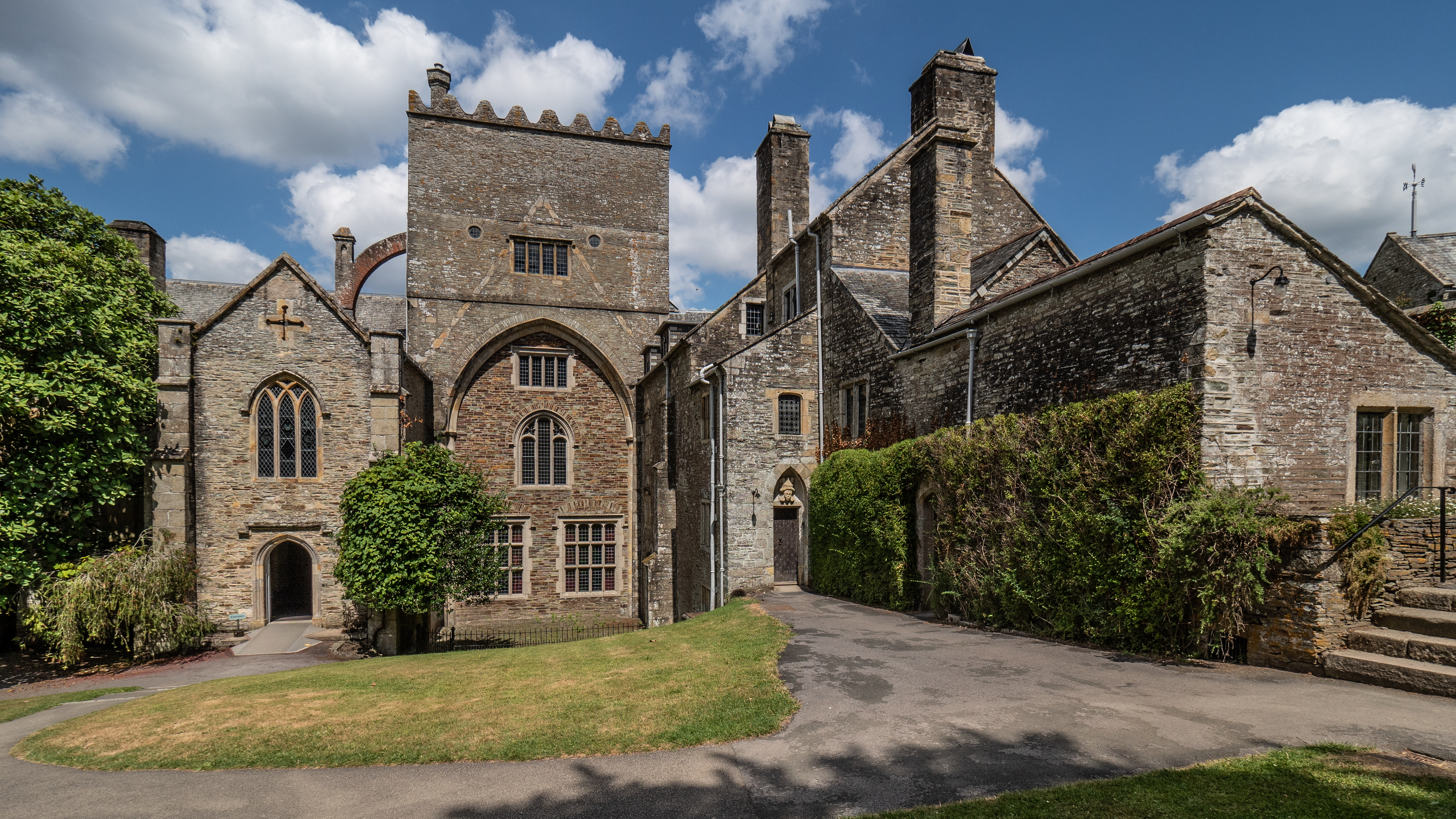
Buckland Abbey in Devon

Francis Drake married Mary Newman at St Budeaux church near Plymouth, on 4 July 1569. She died about 24 January 1583. In 1585, Drake married Elizabeth Sydenham, born around 1562, the only child of Sir George Sydenham, of Combe Sydenham, who was the High Sheriff of Somerset.

In 1580, Drake purchased Buckland Abbey, a large manor house near Yelverton, Devon, via intermediaries from Sir Richard Grenville. He lived there for fifteen years, until his final voyage, and it remained in his family until 1946. Buckland Abbey is now in the care of the National Trust and a number of mementos of his life are displayed there. His coat of arms and full achievement is depicted in the form of a large, coloured plaster overmantel in the Lifetimes Gallery at Buckland Abbey.

Drake was one of twelve children. His brother Thomas accompanied him on voyages, and named his son after him. That nephew eventually became Sir Francis Drake, 1st Baronet.

== Legacy and honours ==
Historical sources on Drake's early life are scarce, and tend to be obscure. Two common scholarly traditions concerning his life and contributions have resulted. The older tradition can be found in Julian Corbett's biography, Drake and the Tudor Navy (1898) which identifies Drake as the single most important figure in the founding and triumph of the British navy. The alternative approach locates Drake squarely within privateering. The first has tended to laud only his successes, while Sugden writes that the second approach, which emphasises his flaws and failures, has sometimes been less than just. Drake left behind no words of his own, only his actions and their interpretation which, as Peter Whitfield says, "is open to deep disagreement". According to Whitfield, scholarship on Drake has moved "from the hero worship of the Victorians to the cold iconoclasm" of the twenty-first century.

Drake's will was the focus of an extensive confidence scam which Oscar Hartzell perpetrated in the 1920s and 1930s.

Drake's Drum has become an icon of English folklore with its variation of the classic king asleep in mountain story motif. It inspired a poem by Henry Newbolt.

Drake was a major focus in the video game series Uncharted, specifically its first and third instalments, Uncharted: Drake's Fortune and Uncharted 3: Drake's Deception, respectively. The series follows Nathan Drake, a self-proclaimed descendant of Drake who retraces his ancestor's voyages.

Drake was the subject of a TV series, Sir Francis Drake (1961–1962). Terence Morgan played Drake in the 26-episode adventure drama.

In Valparaíso, Chile, folklore associates a cave known as Cueva del Pirata (lit. 'Cave of the Pirate') with Francis Drake. A legend says that when Drake ransacked the port, he was disappointed with the scant plunder, and proceeded to enter the churches in fury to sack them and urinate on the chalices. Supposedly he still found the plunder to be not worth enough to take on board his galleon, and hid it in the cave.

SS Francis Drake, a Liberty Ship built in World War II, was named for him.

=== Geographical names ===
Drake Passage, a strait connecting the southern Atlantic Ocean and the Pacific Ocean, is named after him.

There are various places in the United Kingdom named after him, especially in Plymouth, Devon. Places there carrying his name include Drake's Island, Drake Circus Shopping Centre, and the Royal Navy base HMNB Devonport (also known as "HMS Drake"). Plymouth Hoe is also home to a statue of Drake. The Sir Francis Drake Channel is located in the British Virgin Islands.

Various mountains in British Columbia were named in the 1930s for Drake, or in connection with Elizabeth I or other figures of that era, including Mount Sir Francis Drake, Mount Queen Bess, and the Golden Hinde, the highest mountain on Vancouver Island. Fringe theorists suggest he may also have landed to the north of the usual site considered to be Nova Albion – among them Canadian Samuel Bawlf, who claims that its true location was on Vancouver Island at latitude 50 degrees north.

Several landmarks in northern California were named after Drake, beginning in the late 19th century and continuing into the 20th century. American historian Richard White posits that these commemorations have origins in 19th-century Anglo-Saxonism. Public scrutiny of these memorials intensified in 2020 after the George Floyd protests drew critical attention to place names and monuments perceived to be connected to white supremacy, colonialism, or racial injustice. Several California landmarks that commemorated Drake were removed or renamed. Citing Drake's associations with the transatlantic slave trade, colonialism and piracy, Sir Francis Drake High School, in San Anselmo, California, changed its name to Archie Williams High School, after former teacher and Olympic athlete Archie Williams. A statue of Drake in Larkspur, California was also removed by the city authorities. Multiple jurisdictions in Marin County considered renaming Sir Francis Drake Boulevard, one of its major thoroughfares, but left the name intact when they failed to reach a consensus. In San Francisco, the Sir Francis Drake Hotel was renamed the Beacon Grand Hotel.

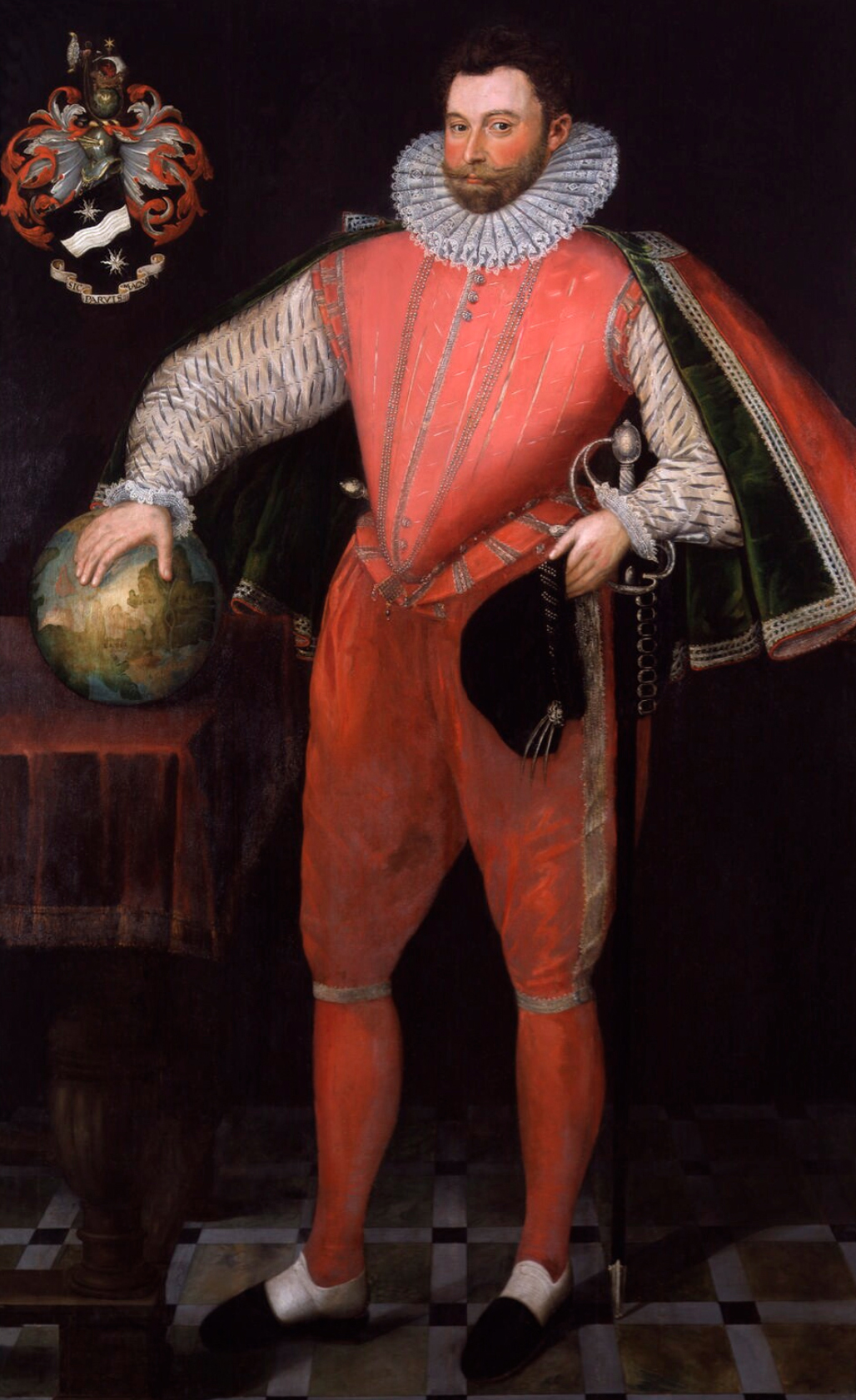
This portrait, c. 1581, is at the National Portrait Gallery, London

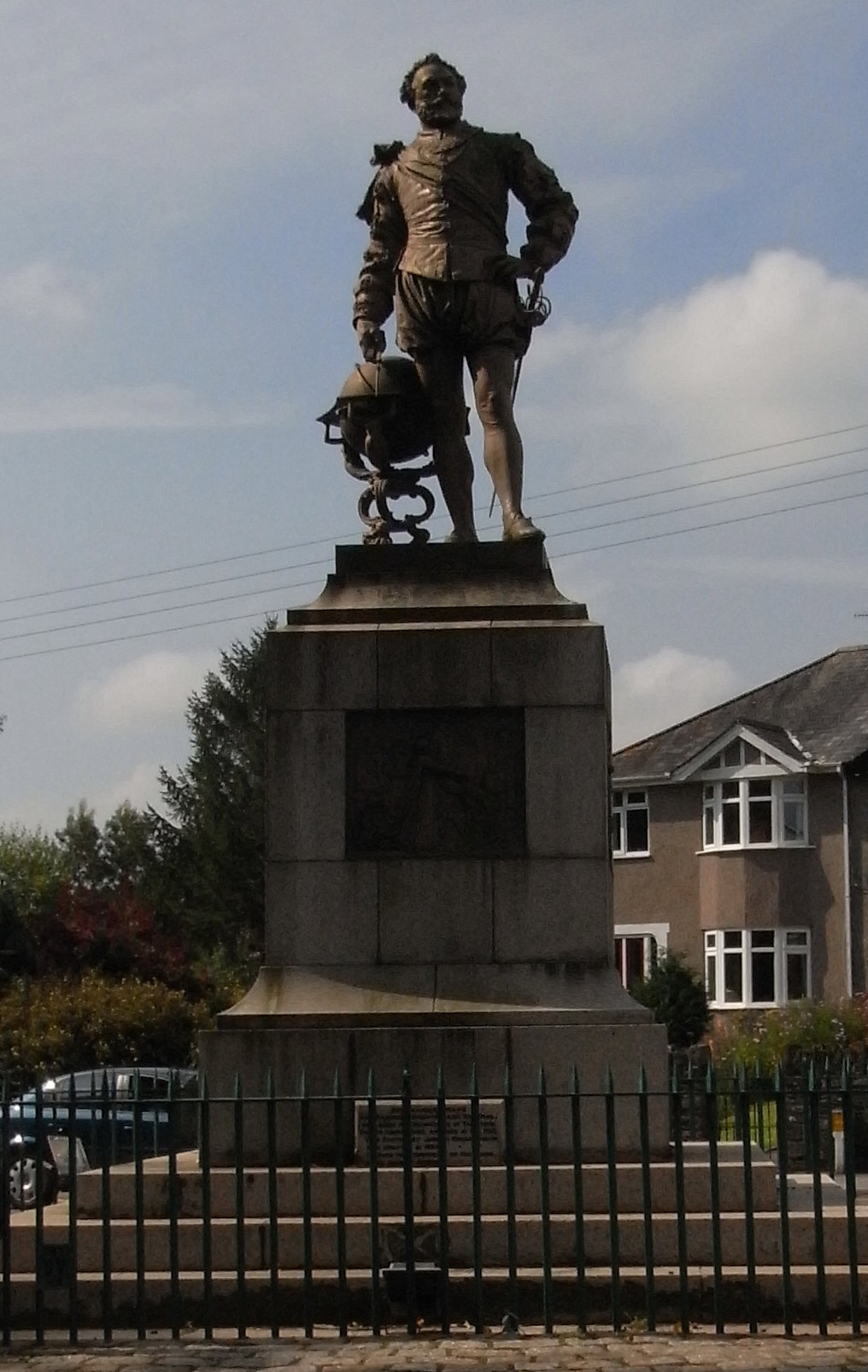
Bronze statue in Tavistock, the parish in which he was born, by Joseph Boehm, 1883

== See also ==
- Heroologia Anglica
- Francis William Drake – relative of Sir Francis Drake
- Drake's Leat – a water supply for Plymouth, promoted by Drake

== Bibliography ==
- Barrow, John (1843). The life, voyages, and exploits of Sir Francis Drake : with numerous original letters from him and the Lord High Admiral to the Queen and great officers of state. London: John Murray, Albemarle Street. ISBN 978-1-78987-509-6. OCLC 26727420.
- Bawlf, Samuel (2003). The Secret Voyage of Sir Francis Drake: 1577–1580. Bloomsbury Publishing. ISBN 978-0802718082.
- Bergreen, Laurence (2021). In Search of a Kingdom: Francis Drake, Elizabeth I, and the Perilous Birth of the British Empire (1st ed.). New York: Custom House. ISBN 9780062875389. OCLC 1193560224.
- Bevan, Bryan (1971). The Great Seamen of Elizabeth I. London: Robert Hale.
- Coote, Stephen (2005). Drake: The Life and Legend of an Elizabethan Hero. New York: Thomas Dunne Books. ISBN 978-0743468701.
- Corbett, Julian (1898). Drake and the Tudor navy. Longmans, Green, and Co.
- Cummins, John (1997). Francis Drake: The Lives of a Hero. St. Martin's Press. p. 126. ISBN 978-0312163655.
- Groesen, Michiel van (2026). An Ocean of Rumours: News and Information in the Atlantic World. Cambridge UP, Ch. 1.
- Hakluyt, Richard (1880). Payne, Edward John (ed.). Voyages of the Elizabethan seamen to America. Thirteen original narratives from the collection of Hakluyt. London: Thos. de la Rue & Co.
- Hampden, Janet; Hampden, John, eds. (1954). Sir Francis Drake's Raid on the Treasure Trains, Being the Memorable Relation of His Voyage to the West Indies in 1572. London: Folio Society.
- Kelsey, Harry (2000). Sir Francis Drake: The Queen's Pirate. Yale University Press. ISBN 978-0300084634.
- Kraus, Hans (1970). Sir Francis Drake: A Pictorial Biography. N. Israel, Amsterdam.
- Lace, William (2009). Sir Francis Drake. Chelsea House Publishers. ISBN 978-1604134179.
- Lane, Kris (2015) [1990]. Pillaging the Empire: Piracy in the Americas 1500–1750. M.E. Sharpe. ISBN 978-0765602565.
- Loades, David (2007). "Drake, Francis (1540–1595) English seaman and circumnavigator". In Hattendorf, John J. (ed.). The Oxford Encyclopedia of Maritime History. Oxford: Oxford University Press. ISBN 978-0195307405.
- Mattingly, Garett (1959). The Defeat of the Spanish Armada. Houghton Mifflin Company.. Received a special citation from the Pulitzer Prize committee in 1960.
- Maynarde, Thomas (1849). Sir Francis Drake his voyage, 1595 – via Internet Archive.
- Sugden, John (2006) [1990]. Sir Francis Drake. United Kingdom: Pimlico. ISBN 978-1844137626.
- Sugden, John (2012). Sir Francis Drake. Random House. ISBN 978-1448129508.
- Wallis, Helen (1984). "The Cartography of Drake's voyages". Sir Francis Drake and the famous voyage, 1577–1580. Berkley: University of California Press.
- Wilson, Derek (1977). The World Encompassed: Drake's Great Voyage, 1577–80. Harper & Row. ISBN 978-0060146795.
- White, Richard (2020). California Exposures: Envisioning Myth and History. New York: W. W. Norton & Company. pp. 1–31. ISBN 978-0393243062. OCLC 1102467481.
- Whitfield, Peter (2004). Sir Francis Drake. NYU Press. ISBN 978-0814794036.
- Whiting, J. R. S. (1988). The Enterprise of England: The Spanish Armada. Gloucester: St. Martin's Press. ISBN 0312024010.
