= Robert Hutchinson (historian) =

British historian

Robert Hutchinson, OBE FSA, is a British historian from Arundel.

Hutchinson is specialized in the history of the Reformation, especially church archeology. He is a Fellow of the Society of Antiquaries of London (FSA). Hutchinson earned a PhD degree in 2010.

== Works ==
- The Last Days of Henry VIII: Conspiracy, Treason and Heresy at the Court of the dying Tyrant (2005)
- Elizabeth's Spy Master: Francis Walsingham and the Secret War that saved England (2006)
- Thomas Cromwell: The Rise and Fall of Henry VIII's most Notorious Minister (2007)
- House of Treason: The Rise and Fall of a Tudor Dynasty (2009)
- Young Henry: The Rise of Henry VIII (2011)
- The Spanish Armada (2013)
- Henry VIII: The Decline and Fall of a Tyrant (2020)
