= Augusto Hidalgo =

Spanish politician (born 1972)

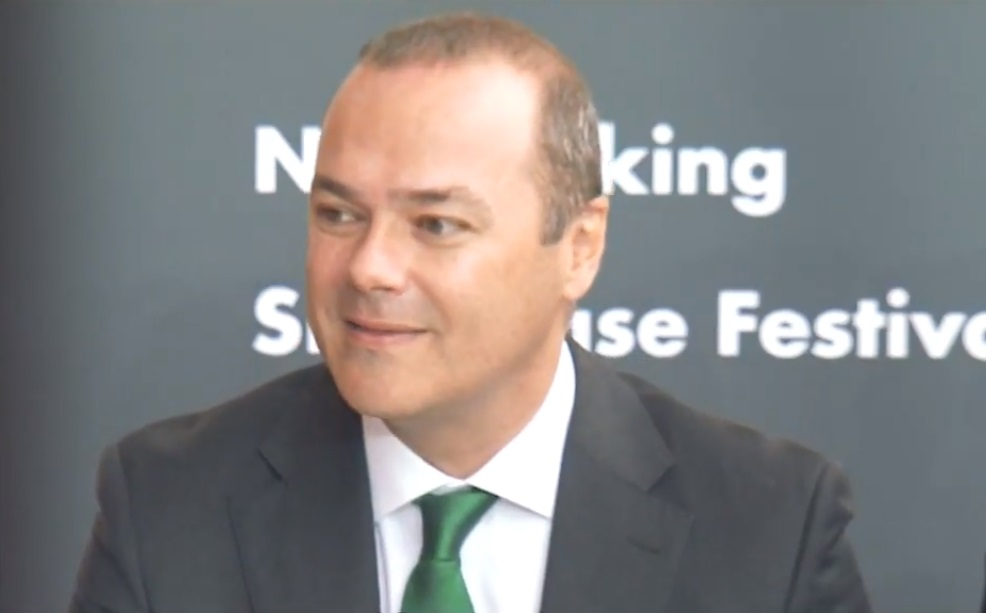

Augusto Hidalgo Macario (born 10 May 1972) is a Spanish Socialist Workers' Party (PSOE) politician. He was elected to the city council of Las Palmas in the Canary Islands in 2007 and was mayor from 2015 to 2023. Since 2023, he is vice president of the Cabildo Insular de Gran Canaria.

== Early and personal life ==
Born in Las Palmas in the Canary Islands. Through the National University of Distance Education (UNED), he graduated in Political Sciences and Sociology, and earned master's degrees in Prevention of Occupational Hazards and Training of Trainers. His father, Augusto Hidalgo Champsaur, was labour lawyer and anti-Francoist activist. According to his own official online biography, the younger Hidalgo was suspended from school at the age of 14 for going on strike. As of 2019, Hidalgo is married and has a daughter.

== Political career ==
Hidalgo's early years of political activity were spent in the Canarian United Left (IUC) and the Canarian Initiative (Icán). He led the former's list in the Las Palmas constituency for the 2000 Spanish general election. After leaving politics for the private sector, he returned and was elected to Las Palmas city hall in the 2007 elections, representing the Spanish Socialist Workers' Party (PSOE). In 2011, he retained his seat and was also elected to the Gran Canaria Island Council.

In October 2014, Hidalgo won the primary to be the PSOE candidate for mayor of Las Palmas in the 2015 election. In June, he succeeded the People's Party (PP) incumbent Juan José Cardona as mayor, with support from Podemos and local left-wing party New Canaries. In 2015, his was the second-largest city governed by the PSOE, after Seville; news agency EFE named him as a representative of a wave of progressive mayors elected that year while saying that he differed from his contemporaries such as Abel Caballero (Vigo) and José María González Santos (Cádiz) in having a more reserved personality and approach.

Hidalgo's three-way pact was repeated in 2019. He did not run for re-election in 2023, becoming one of 19 out of 29 of the incumbent Las Palmas councillors to not return.

In September 2022, Hidalgo submitted his application to lead the PSOE in the following year's election to the Island Council. In the election, the PSOE and New Canaries renewed their government pact by taking 14 seats, while the PP, Vox and Canarian Coalition had 13 together. Hidalgo was named vice president, and put in charge of the Ministry of Public Works and Infrastructure, Architecture and Housing.

On 30 April 2022, Hidalgo was named secretary general of the PSOE in Las Palmas, naming a 32-person executive split equally between men and women, with 18 being retained from the previous administration. He resigned three years later, ceding the position to his successor as mayor, Carolina Darias.
