= Battle of Las Palmas =

1595 naval battle of the Anglo-Spanish War

- Part of Anglo–Spanish War (1585)
Date	October, 1595
Location	Off Las Palmas, Canary Islands, Spain
Result	Spanish victory

Belligerents
Kingdom of England	Spain

Commanders and leaders
(England) Francis Drake (England) John Hawkins	(Spain) Alonso Alvarado (Spain) Antonio Pamochamoso

Strength
6 Royal galleons 21 men of war 14 pinnaces 2 flatboats	Coastal Forts and batteries

Casualties and losses
Unknown	Unknown

The Battle of las Palmas was an unsuccessful English naval expedition in 1595 during the Anglo-Spanish War against the Spanish island of Gran Canaria. The English Fleet was originally directed towards Puerto Rico, but had taken a detour in hopes of an easy victory and taking supplies. The English expeditionary fleet under Francis Drake, Sir John Hawkins, and Sir Thomas Baskerville failed to achieve victory and was forced to withdraw from the Canary Islands towards the Spanish Caribbean, where Francis Drake died of dysentery at Mosquito Gulf.

== Background ==
Captain Drake proposed an attack on the Canary Islands in order to get provisions and plunder. Hawkins utterly refused to consider it, because an attack would have put the whole enterprise that sailed from England two months ago in risk; while the main purpose of the voyage (control the Isthmus of Panama in the Spanish Main) would be delayed. A day later they agreed to discuss the issue at dinner on the Garland. Captain Baskerville was sure he could take Las Palmas in four hours and persuade the inhabitants to ransom it within four days. John Troughton, captain of the Elizabeth Bonaventure, reported in his journal that there was talk of Hawkins threatening to press on to Puerto Rico and leaving Drake and Baskerville to do whatever they chose, but the old man eventually succumbed to persuasion with an ill grace, and the English fleet remained together for the unplanned assault on Gran Canaria. After the English arrived, at eleven o'clock Drake sent one of the smaller ships forward to reconnoitre along the shore, past the Caleta de Santa Catalina and down to the fort of Santa Ana.

He went himself in one of the Defiance's boats to take soundings off the Caleta and to lay buoys to guide the landing, after which he returned to the fleet. In Las Palmas the lieutenant-governor, Antonio Pamochamoso, watched him go and then ordered a boat to sail out and remove the buoys, but by the time the English were ready and anchored their ships and launched the assault.

== Action ==
On 6 October, 21 English men-of-war appeared at Las Palmas in the Canary islands. Fifteen of them were positioned in front of the castle of Santa Catalina; the rest fought against the fort of Santa Ana protecting the disembarkation of the English troops. However, the governor Alonso de Alvarado and the Spanish garrison were able to organize their defense. They handled six small pieces of artillery, heavily damaged four of the English ships and after several days Drake was forced to withdraw. After that unexpected resistance Drake left to Puerto Rico with the intention of continuing his original directive of controlling the Isthmus of Panama and the Spanish Caribbean, but died off Portobelo after being repulsed at San Juan and Panama.
